= GALLEX =

Neutrino detection experiment from 1991 to 1997

Coordinates: 42°25′14″N 13°30′59″E

GALLEX or Gallium Experiment was a radiochemical neutrino detection experiment that ran between 1991 and 1997 at the Laboratori Nazionali del Gran Sasso (LNGS). This project was performed by an international collaboration of French, German, Italian, Israeli, Polish and American scientists led by the Max-Planck-Institut für Kernphysik Heidelberg. After brief interruption, the experiment was continued under a new name GNO (Gallium Neutrino Observatory) from May 1998 to April 2003.

It was designed to detect solar neutrinos and prove theories related to the Sun's energy creation mechanism. Before this experiment (and the SAGE experiment that ran concurrently), there had been no observation of low energy solar neutrinos.

== Location ==
The experiment's main components, the tank and the counters, were located in the underground astrophysical laboratory Laboratori Nazionali del Gran Sasso in the Italian Abruzzo region, near L'Aquila, and situated inside the 2912-metre-high Gran Sasso mountain. Its place under a depth of rock equivalent of 3200 metres of water was important to shield from cosmic rays. This laboratory is accessible by a highway A-24, which runs through the mountain.

== Detector ==
The 54-m^{3} detector tank was filled with 101 tons of gallium trichloride–hydrochloric acid solution, which contained 30.3 tons of gallium. The gallium in this solution acted as the target for a neutrino-induced nuclear reaction, which transmuted it into germanium through the following reaction:

ν_{e} + ^{71}Ga → ^{71}Ge + e^{−}.

The threshold for neutrino detection by this reaction is very low (232.5 keV), and this is also the reason why gallium was chosen: other reactions (as with chlorine-37) have higher thresholds and are thus unable to detect low-energy neutrinos. In fact, the low energy threshold makes the reaction with gallium suitable to the detection of neutrinos emitted in the initial proton fusion reaction of the proton-proton chain reaction, which have a maximum energy of 420 keV.

The produced germanium-71 was chemically extracted from the detector, converted to germane (^{71}GeH_{4}). Its decay, with a half-life of 11.468 days, was detected by counters. Each detected decay corresponded to one detected neutrino.

== Results ==
During the period 1991–1997, the detector measured capture rate of 73.1 SNU (Solar neutrino units). The follow-up GNO experiment found the capture rate 62.9.

The rate of neutrinos detected by this experiment disagreed with standard solar model predictions. Thanks to the use of gallium, it was the first experiment to observe solar initial pp neutrinos. Another important result was the detection of a smaller number of neutrinos than that model predicted (the solar neutrino problem). After detector calibration the amount did not change. This discrepancy has since been explained: such radiochemical neutrino detectors are sensitive only to electron neutrinos, and not to muon neutrinos or tau neutrinos, hence the neutrino oscillation of electron neutrinos emitted from the Sun and travelling to Earth accounts for the discrepancy.

Results from GALLEX together with SAGE and later confirmed by the BEST experiment have reported a deficit in the expected decay of ${}^{71}\text{Ga}+\nu_e \rightarrow e^{-}+{}^{71}\text{Ge}$ that has been named the gallium anomaly.

== Other experiments ==
The first solar neutrino detection, the Homestake Experiment, used chlorine-37 to detect neutrinos with energies down to 814 keV.

After the end of GALLEX its successor project, the Gallium Neutrino Observatory or G.N.O., was started at LNGS in April 1998. The project continued until 2003.

A similar experiment detecting solar neutrinos using liquid gallium-71 was the Russian-American Gallium Experiment SAGE.
