= Solar neutrino =

Extremely light particle produced by the Sun

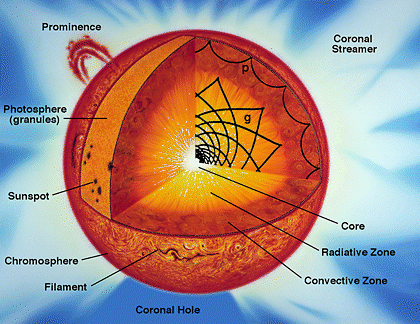
Diagram showing the Sun's components. The core is where nuclear fusion takes place, creating solar neutrinos.

A solar neutrino is a neutrino originating from nuclear fusion in the Sun's core, and is the most common type of neutrino passing through any source observed on Earth at any particular moment. Neutrinos are elementary particles with extremely small rest mass and a neutral electric charge. They only interact with matter via weak interaction and gravity, making their detection very difficult. This has led to the now-resolved solar neutrino problem. Much is now known about solar neutrinos, but research in this field is ongoing.

== History and background ==
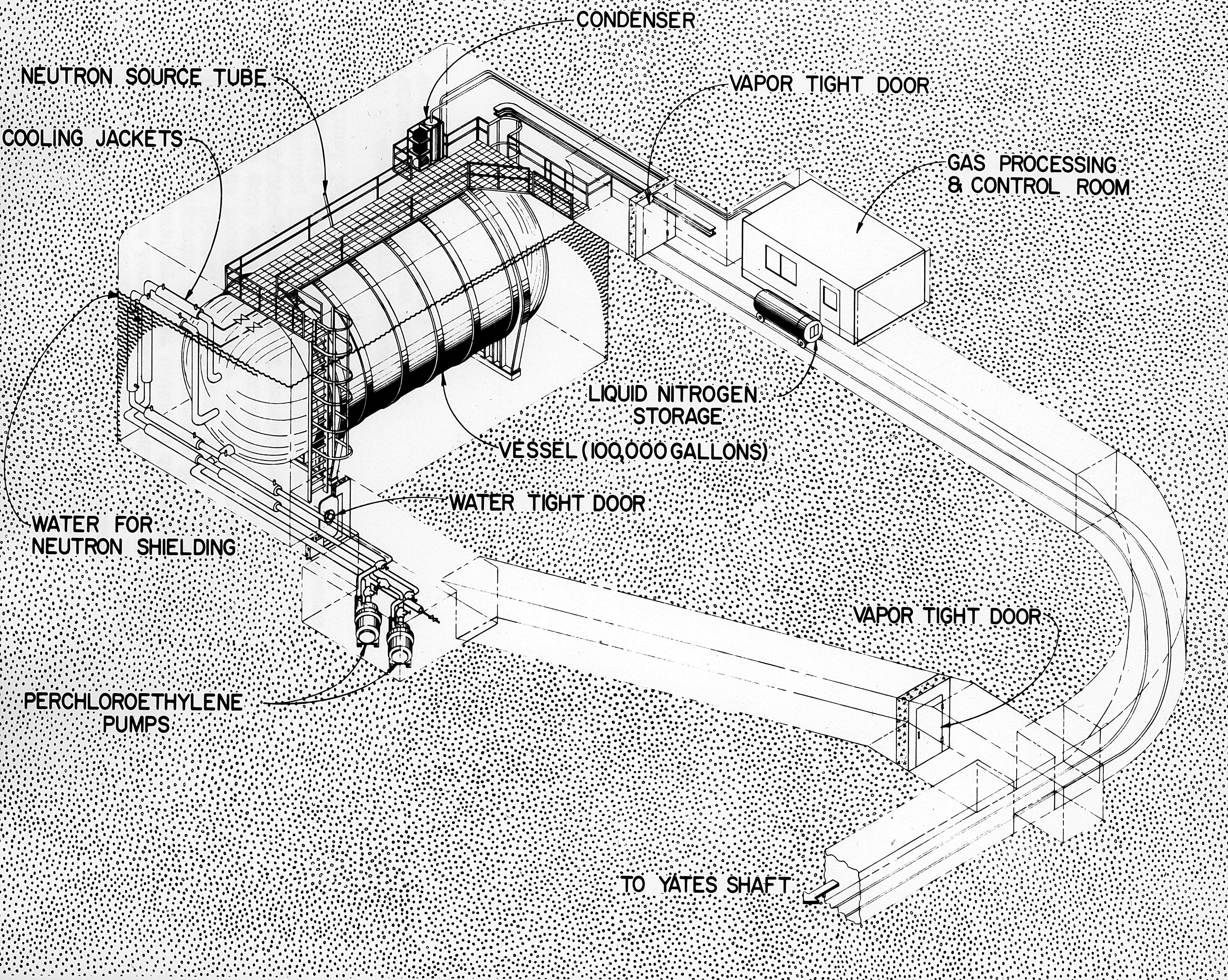
Diagram of the Homestake experiment set-up

=== Homestake experiment ===
The timeline of solar neutrinos and their discovery dates back to the 1960s, beginning with the two astrophysicists John N. Bahcall and Raymond Davis Jr. The experiment, known as the Homestake experiment, named after the town in which it was conducted (Homestake, South Dakota), aimed to count the solar neutrinos arriving at Earth. Bahcall, using a solar model he developed, came to the conclusion that the most effective way to study solar neutrinos would be via the chlorine-argon reaction. Using his model, Bahcall was able to calculate the number of neutrinos expected to arrive at Earth from the Sun.

Once the theoretical value was determined, the astrophysicists began pursuing experimental confirmation. Davis developed the idea of taking hundreds of thousands of liters of perchloroethylene, a chemical compound made up of carbon and chlorine, and searching for neutrinos using a chlorine-argon detector. The process was conducted very far underground, hence the decision to conduct the experiment in Homestake as the town was home to the Homestake Gold Mine. By conducting the experiment deep underground, Bahcall and Davis were able to avoid cosmic ray interactions which could affect the process and results. The entire experiment lasted several years as it was able to detect only a few chlorine to argon conversions each day, and the first results were not yielded by the team until 1968. To their surprise, the experimental value of the solar neutrinos present was less than 20% of the theoretical value Bahcall calculated. At the time, it was unknown if there was an error with the experiment or with the calculations, or if Bahcall and Davis did not account for all variables, but this discrepancy gave birth to what became known as the solar neutrino problem.

=== Further experimentation ===
Davis and Bahcall continued their work to understand where they may have gone wrong or what they were missing, along with other astrophysicists who also did their own research on the subject. Many reviewed and redid Bahcall's calculations in the 1970s and 1980s, and although there was more data making the results more precise, the difference still remained. Davis even repeated his experiment changing the sensitivity and other factors to make sure nothing was overlooked, but he found nothing and the results still showed "missing" neutrinos. By the end of the 1970s, the widely expected result was the experimental data yielded about 39% of the calculated number of neutrinos. In 1969, Bruno Pontecorvo, an Italo-Russian astrophysicist, suggested a new idea that maybe we do not quite understand neutrinos like we think we do, and that neutrinos could change in some way, meaning the neutrinos that are released by the sun changed form and were no longer neutrinos the way neutrinos were thought of by the time they reached Earth where the experiment was conducted. This theory Pontecorvo had would make sense in accounting for the discrepancy between the experimental and theoretical results that persisted.

=== Solution to solar neutrino problem ===
Pontecorvo was never able to prove his theory, but he was on to something with his thinking. In 2002, results from an experiment conducted 2100 meters underground at the Sudbury Neutrino Observatory proved and supported Pontecorvo's theory and discovered that neutrinos released from the Sun can in fact change form or flavor because they are not completely massless. This discovery of neutrino oscillation solved the solar neutrino problem, nearly 40 years after Davis and Bahcall began studying solar neutrinos.

== Neutrino observatories ==
=== Super-Kamiokande ===
The Super-Kamiokande is a 50,000 ton water Cherenkov detector 2,700 meters (8,900 ft) underground. The primary uses for this detector in Japan in addition to neutrino observation is cosmic ray observation as well as searching for proton decay. In 1998, the Super-Kamiokande was the site of the Super-Kamiokande experiment which led to the discovery of neutrino oscillation, the process by neutrinos change their flavor, either to electron, muon or tau.

The Super-Kamiokande experiment began in 1996 and is still active. In the experiment, the detector works by being able to spot neutrinos by analyzing the blue Cherenkov light emitted by electrons removed from water molecules by neutrinos. Therefore, when this detection of blue light happens it can be inferred that a neutrino is present and counted.

=== The Sudbury Neutrino Observatory ===
The Sudbury Neutrino Observatory (SNO), a 2,100 m (6,900 ft) underground observatory in Sudbury, Canada, is the other site where neutrino oscillation research was taking place in the late 1990s and early 2000s. The results from experiments at this observatory along with those at Super-Kamiokande are what helped solve the solar neutrino problem.

The SNO is also a heavy-water Cherenkov detector and designed to work the same way as the Super-Kamiokande. The Neutrinos when reacted with heavy water produce the blue Cherenkov light, signaling the detection of neutrinos to researchers and observers.

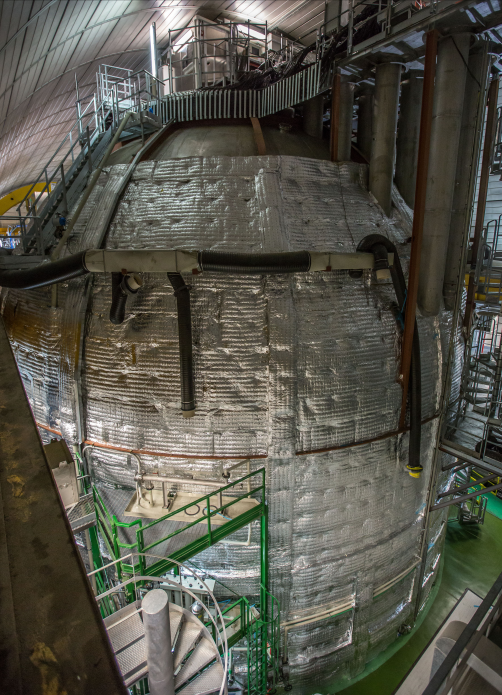
Borexino detector exterior

=== Borexino ===
The Borexino detector is located at the Laboratori Nazionali de Gran Sasso, Italy. Borexino is an active detector, and experiments are still on-going. The goal of the Borexino experiment is measuring low energy, typically below 1 MeV, solar neutrinos in real-time. The detector is a complex structure consisting of liquid scintillator, photomultipliers, and calibration systems making it possible to take proper measurements of the low energy solar neutrinos. Photomultipliers are used as the detection device in this system as they are able to detect light for extremely weak signals.

Solar neutrinos are able to provide direct insight into the core of the Sun because that is where the solar neutrinos originate. Solar neutrinos leaving the Sun's core reach Earth before light does due to the fact solar neutrinos do not interact with any other particle or subatomic particle during their path, while light (photons) bounces around from particle to particle. The Borexino experiment used this phenomenon to discover that the Sun releases the same amount of energy currently as it did a 100,000 years ago.

== Formation process ==
Solar neutrinos are produced in the core of the Sun through various nuclear fusion reactions, each of which occurs at a particular rate and leads to its own spectrum of neutrino energies. Details of the more prominent of these reactions are described below.

Solar neutrinos (proton–proton chain) in the standard solar model

The main contribution comes from the proton–proton chain. The reaction is:

$$\text{p} + \text{p} \to \text{d} + \text{e}^{+} + \operatorname{\nu}_\text{e}$$

or in words:

two protons $\to$ deuteron + positron + electron neutrino.

Of all solar neutrinos, approximately 91% are produced from this reaction. As shown in the figure titled "Solar neutrinos (proton–proton chain) in the standard solar model", the deuteron will fuse with another proton to create a ^{3}He nucleus and a gamma ray. This reaction can be seen as:

$$\text{d} + \text{p} \to  {^3}\text{He} + \operatorname{\gamma}$$

The isotope ^{4}He can be produced by using the ^{3}He in the previous reaction which is seen below.

$${^3}\text{He} + {^3}\text{He} \to  {^4}\text{He} + 2\,\text{p}$$

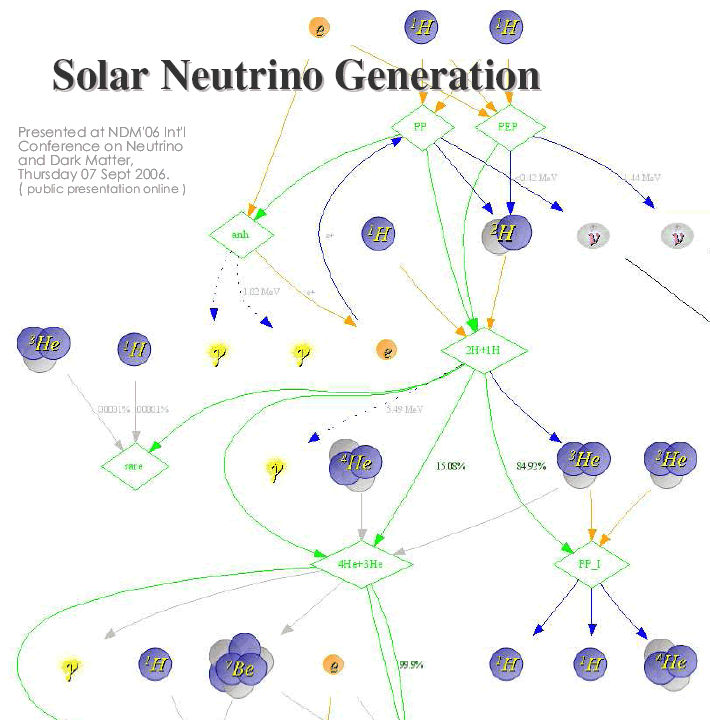
Solar Neutrino Generation

With both helium-3 and helium-4 now in the environment, one of each weight of helium nucleus can fuse to produce beryllium:

$${^3}\text{He} + {^4}\text{He} \to  {^7}\text{Be} + \operatorname{\gamma}$$

Beryllium-7 can follow two different paths from this stage: It could capture an electron and produce the more stable lithium-7 nucleus and an electron neutrino, or alternatively, it could capture one of the abundant protons, which would create boron-8. The first reaction via lithium-7 is:

$${^7}\text{Be} + \text{e}^{-} \to  {^7}\text{Li} + \operatorname{\nu}_\text{e}$$

This lithium-yielding reaction produces approximately 7% of the solar neutrinos. The resulting lithium-7 later combines with a proton to produce two nuclei of helium-4. The alternative reaction is proton capture, that produces boron-8, which then beta^{+} decays into beryllium-8 as shown below:

${^7}\text{Be} + \text{p} \to {^8}\text{B} + \operatorname{\gamma}$

$${^8}\text{B} \to  {^8}\text{Be}{^*} + \text{e}^{+} + \operatorname{\nu}_\text{e}$$

This alternative boron-yielding reaction produces about 0.02% of the solar neutrinos; although so few that they would conventionally be neglected, these rare solar neutrinos stand out because of their higher average energies. The asterisk (*) on the beryllium-8 nucleus indicates that it is in an excited, unstable state. The excited beryllium-8 nucleus then splits into two helium-4 nuclei:

$${^8}\text{Be}{^*} \to {^4}\text{He} + {^4}\text{He}$$

== Observed data ==
The greatest number of solar neutrinos are direct products of the proton–proton reaction (tall, dark blue curve on the left). They have a low energy – only reaching up to 400 keV. There are several other significant production mechanisms, with energies up to 18 MeV.

The highest flux of solar neutrinos come directly from the proton–proton reaction, and have a low energy, up to 400 keV. There are also several other significant production mechanisms, with energies up to 18 MeV. On Earth the neutrino flux from the proton–proton reaction is measured as (6.1±0.5)×10^{10} particles·cm^{−2}·s ^{−1}; another reaction called ^{7}Be adds (4.99±0.11)×10^{9} particles·cm^{−2}·s ^{−1}. The number of neutrinos can be predicted with great confidence by the standard solar model, but the number of neutrinos detected on Earth versus the number of neutrinos predicted are different by a factor of a third, which is the solar neutrino problem.

Solar models additionally predict the location within the Sun's core where solar neutrinos should originate, depending on the nuclear fusion reaction which leads to their production. Future neutrino detectors will be able to detect the incoming direction of these neutrinos with enough precision to measure this effect.

Theoretical curves of survival probability of solar neutrinos that arrive on day (orange, continuous) or on night (purple, dashed), as a function of the energy of the neutrinos. Also shown the four values of the energy of the neutrinos at which measurements have been performed, corresponding to four different branches of the proton–proton chain.

The energy spectrum of solar neutrinos is also predicted by solar models. It is essential to know this energy spectrum because different neutrino detection experiments are sensitive to different neutrino energy ranges. The Homestake experiment used chlorine and was most sensitive to solar neutrinos produced by the decay of the beryllium isotope ^{7}Be. The Sudbury Neutrino Observatory is most sensitive to solar neutrinos produced by ^{8}B. The detectors that use gallium are most sensitive to the solar neutrinos produced by the proton–proton chain reaction process, however they were not able to observe this contribution separately. The observation of the neutrinos from the basic reaction of this chain, proton–proton fusion in deuterium, was achieved for the first time by Borexino in 2014. In 2012 the same collaboration reported detecting low-energy neutrinos for the proton–electron–proton (pep reaction) that produces 1 in 400 deuterium nuclei in the Sun. The detector contained 100 metric tons of liquid and saw on average 3 events each day (due to ^{11}C production) from this relatively uncommon thermonuclear reaction. In 2014, Borexino reported a successful direct detection of neutrinos from the pp-reaction at a rate of 144±33/day, consistent with the predicted rate of 131±2/day that was expected based on the standard solar model prediction that the pp-reaction generates 99% of the Sun's luminosity and their analysis of the detector's efficiency. And in 2020, Borexino reported the first detection of CNO cycle neutrinos from deep within the solar core.

Note that Borexino measured neutrinos of several energies; in this manner they have demonstrated experimentally, for the first time, the pattern of solar neutrino oscillations predicted by the theory. Neutrinos can trigger nuclear reactions. By looking at ancient ores of various ages that have been exposed to solar neutrinos over geologic time, it may be possible to interrogate the luminosity of the Sun over time, which, according to the standard solar model, has changed over the eons as the (presently) inert byproduct helium has accumulated in its core.

== Key contributing astrophysicists ==
Wolfgang Pauli was the first to suggest the idea of a particle such as the neutrino existing in our universe in 1930. He believed such a particle to be completely massless. This was the belief amongst the astrophysics community until the solar neutrino problem was solved.

Frederick Reines and Clyde Cowan were the first astrophysicists to detect neutrinos in 1956. They won a Nobel Prize in Physics for their work in 1995.

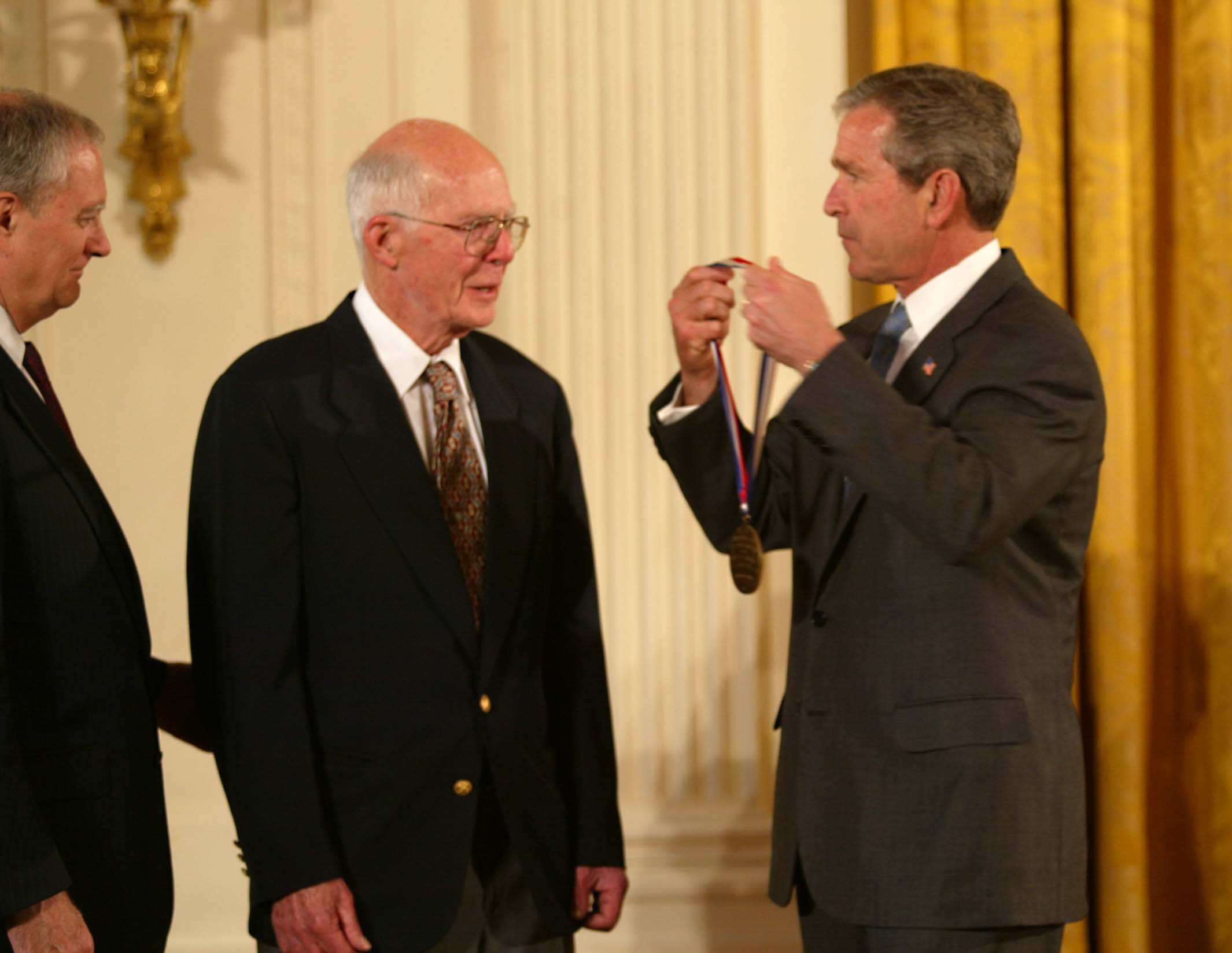
Raymond Davis Jr receives the Medal of Science from President George W. Bush.

Raymond Davis and John Bahcall are the pioneers of solar neutrino studies. While Bahcall never won a Nobel Prize, Davis along with Masatoshi Koshiba won the Nobel Prize in Physics in 2002 after the solar neutrino problem was solved for their contributions in helping solve the problem.

Pontecorvo, known as the first astrophysicist to suggest the idea neutrinos have some mass and can oscillate, never received a Nobel Prize for his contributions due to his passing in 1993.

Arthur B. McDonald, a Canadian physicist, was a key contributor in building the Sudbury Neutrino Observatory (SNO) in the mid 1980s and later became the director of the SNO and leader of the team that solved the solar neutrino problem. McDonald, along with Japanese physicist Kajita Takaaki both received a Nobel Prize for their work discovering the oscillation of neutrinos in 2015.

== Current research and findings ==
The critical issue of the solar neutrino problem, that many astrophysicists interested in solar neutrinos studied and attempted to solve in late 1900s and early 2000s, is solved. In the 21st century, even without a main problem to solve, there is still unique and novel research ongoing in this field of astrophysics.

=== Solar neutrino flux at keV energies ===
This research, published in 2017, aimed to solve the solar neutrino and antineutrino flux for extremely low energies (keV range). Processes at these low energies consisted vital information that told researchers about the solar metallicity. Solar metallicity is the measure of elements present in the star that are heavier than hydrogen and helium, typically in this field this element is usually iron. The results from this research yielded significantly different findings compared to past research in terms of the overall flux spectrum. Currently technology does not yet exist to put these findings to the test.

=== Limiting neutrino magnetic moments with Borexino Phase-II solar neutrino data ===
This research, published in 2017, aimed to search for the solar neutrino effective magnetic moment. The search was completed using data from exposure from the Borexino experiment's second phase which consisted of data over 1291.5 days (3.54 years). The results yielded that the electron recoil spectrum shape was as expected with no major changes or deviations from it.

== See also ==
- Neutrino detector
- Neutral particle oscillation
- Solar neutrino unit
- Stellar nucleosynthesis
- Supernova neutrinos
- Diffuse supernova neutrino background (DSNB)
