= Soviet–American Gallium Experiment =

Physics project measuring solar neutrino flux

Coordinates: 43°16′32″N 42°41′25″E

SAGE (Soviet–American Gallium Experiment, or sometimes Russian–American Gallium Experiment) is a collaborative experiment devised by several prominent physicists to measure the flux of solar neutrinos.

== Experiment ==
SAGE was devised to measure the solar neutrino flux through a radiochemical method based on inverse beta decay (more strictly, inverse electron capture), a nuclear reaction between a gallium (Ga) atom and a neutrino (ν) which produces an electron and a germanium (Ge) atom: ^{71}Ga $+ \nu_e \rightarrow e^{-}+$ ^{71}Ge. The target for the reaction was 50–57 tonnes of liquid gallium metal stored 2,100 m (6,900 ft) underground at the Baksan Neutrino Observatory in the Caucasus Mountains in Russia. The laboratory containing the experiment is called the Gallium–Germanium Neutrino Telescope (GGNT) laboratory, GGNT being the name of the SAGE apparatus. About once a month, the neutrino-produced germanium is extracted from the gallium. ^{71}Ge is unstable with respect to electron capture (with a half-life of 11.468 days), and therefore the amount of extracted germanium can be determined from its activity as measured in small proportional counters.

The experiment began measuring the solar neutrino capture rate with the gallium target in December 1989 and continued to run through August 2011 with only a few brief interruptions. In 2013, the experiment was described as "being continued", with the latest published data from August 2011. As of 2014 it was stated that SAGE continues once-a-month extractions, and the experiment was ongoing in 2016 and 2017.

The experiment measured the solar neutrino flux in 168 extractions between January 1990 and December 2007. The result of the experiment based on the 1990–2007 dataset is 65.4+3.1
−3.0 (stat.) ^{+2.6}_{−2.8} (syst.) SNUs. This represents only 56–60% of the capture rate predicted by different standard solar models, which predict 138 SNUs. The difference is in agreement with neutrino oscillations.

The collaboration has used a 518 kCi ^{51}Cr neutrino source to test the experimental operation. The energy of these neutrinos is similar to solar beryllium-7 neutrinos and thus makes an ideal check on the experimental procedure. The extractions for the chromium experiment took place between January and May 1995 and the counting of the samples lasted until fall. The result, expressed in terms of a ratio of the measured production rate to the expected production rate, is 1.0±0.15. This indicates that the discrepancy between the solar model predictions and the SAGE flux measurement cannot be an experimental artifact.

== Gallium anomaly ==
In 2003–2004, an argon-37 neutrino source was made by irradiation of calcium oxide in the BN-600 reactor followed by chemical separation of argon. A calibration experiment with it was performed from April 30th to September 27th. The resulting production of ^{71}Ge was calculated in 2005 to be 79% of expected, confirming an earlier (1998) estimate from one of the GALLEX experiments (another gave results indistinguishable from 100%, similarly to the Cr experiment on SAGE). This discrepancy soon became known as the gallium anomaly.

Following the report of the anomaly in 2006, physicists began to explore potential explanations for the observed deficit. A 2007 analysis examined the data within frameworks of two- and three-neutrino mixing, considering the possibility of electron neutrinos oscillating into a hypothetical sterile neutrino. By 2009, a thorough investigation into potential experimental errors had verified the efficiency of chemical extraction of germanium, counting procedures and data analysis techniques, ruling out significant experimental errors. This strengthened the evidence for the anomaly and pushed the focus towards investigating potential new physics beyond the standard three-neutrino model. A 2013 review combined the gallium results with data from reactor antineutrino experiments, arguing for a consistent pattern of electron (anti)neutrino disappearance at short baselines and highlighting the need for more precise measurements and dedicated experiments to definitively confirm or refute the sterile neutrino interpretation.

On September 24, 2026 a group of researches from Cagliari and Turin in Italy published a paper in PRL providing a possible explanation for the anomaly without invoking any new physics. Traditional calculations for the inverse beta decay cross section involved making certain assumptions about the leptonic wavefunction in order to simplify the calculations. In this new paper, the authors propose an alternative calculation where the wavefunction is not factorized, and then parameterize the transition density from nuclear theory and try to estimate it the parameters of the model to match the half life of ^{71}Ge and also resolve the anomaly. They were able to achieve this, suggesting that the anomaly may be resolved as a simple case of a bad assumption in the cross section calculation.

== Baksan Experiment on Sterile Transitions (BEST) ==
In 2014, the SAGE-experiment's GGNT apparatus was upgraded to perform a very-short-baseline neutrino oscillation experiment, the Baksan Experiment on Sterile Transitions (BEST) with an intense artificial neutrino source based on ^{51}Cr. In 2017, the BEST apparatus was completed, but the artificial neutrino source was missing. As of 2018, the BEST experiment was underway, and a follow-up experiment BEST-2 was under consideration, where the source would be changed to zinc-65. It uses two gallium chambers instead of one, to better determine whether the anomaly could be explained by the distance from the source of the neutrinos.

In June 2022, the BEST experiment released two papers observing a 20–24% deficit in the production the isotope germanium expected from the reaction ${}^{71}\text{Ga}+ \nu_e \rightarrow e^{-}+{}^{71}\text{Ge}$, confirming previous results from SAGE and GALLEX on the so-called gallium anomaly and pointing out that a sterile neutrino explanation can be consistent with the data. Further work has refined the precision for the cross section of the neutrino capture in 2023 which was proposed as a possible inaccuracy source back in 1998, as well as the half-life of ^{71}Ge in 2024, ruling them out as possible explanations for the anomaly.

== Members ==
SAGE has been led by the following physicists over the course of its history:

- Vladimir Gavrin (leader of the experiment as of 2017)
- Georgiy Zatsepin (Joint Institute for Nuclear Research, Russia)
- Thomas J. Bowles (Los Alamos)

== See also ==
- Hans Bethe, architect of the theory of nuclear fusion reactions in stars
- University of Washington, conducts statistical analysis of SAGE data and helps determine systematic uncertainty

== Literature ==
- Abdurashitov, J. N.; et al. (2009). "Measurement of the solar neutrino capture rate with gallium metal. III. Results for the 2002–2007 data-taking period". Physical Review C. 80 (1) 015807. arXiv:0901.2200. Bibcode:2009PhRvC..80a5807A. doi:10.1103/PhysRevC.80.015807. S2CID 118782386.
