= Thomas J. Bowles (physicist) =

American physicist

Thomas Joseph (Tom) Bowles is an American nuclear physicist who works at the Los Alamos National Laboratory. He served as the Laboratory's Chief Science Officer from 2004 to 2006, and also was science advisor to New Mexico Governor Bill Richardson from 2006.

Bowles received his B.Sc. degree at the University of Colorado in 1973 and his Ph.D. at Princeton University in 1978. He joined the Physics Division at Los Alamos in 1979 and was named a Fellow of the Laboratory in 1994.

He was elected a Fellow of the American Physical Society in 1992 and awarded the M. A. Markov Prize by the Russian Academy of Sciences' Institute for Nuclear Research in 2003.

== See also ==
- Russian American Gallium Experiment (SAGE).
