= Standard solar model =

Theoretical framework detailing the sun's structure, composition and energetics

The standard solar model (SSM) is a mathematical model of the Sun as a spherical ball of gas (in varying states of ionisation, with the hydrogen in the deep interior being a completely ionised plasma). This stellar model, technically the spherically symmetric quasi-static model of a star, has stellar structure described by several differential equations derived from basic physical principles. The model is constrained by boundary conditions, namely the luminosity, radius, age and composition of the Sun, which are well determined. The age of the Sun cannot be measured directly; one way to estimate it is from the age of the oldest meteorites, and models of the evolution of the Solar System. The composition in the photosphere of the modern-day Sun, by mass, is 74.9% hydrogen and 23.8% helium. All heavier elements, called metals in astronomy, account for less than 2 percent of the mass. The SSM is used to test the validity of stellar evolution theory. In fact, the only way to determine the two free parameters of the stellar evolution model, the helium abundance and the mixing length parameter (used to model convection in the Sun), are to adjust the SSM to "fit" the observed Sun.

== A calibrated solar model ==
A star is considered to be at zero age (protostellar) when it is assumed to have a homogeneous composition and to be just beginning to derive most of its luminosity from nuclear reactions (so neglecting the period of contraction from a cloud of gas and dust). To obtain the SSM, a one solar mass (M_{☉}) stellar model at zero age is evolved numerically to the age of the Sun. The abundance of elements in the zero age solar model is estimated from primordial meteorites. Along with this abundance information, a reasonable guess at the zero-age luminosity (such as the present-day Sun's luminosity) is then converted by an iterative procedure into the correct value for the model, and the temperature, pressure and density throughout the model calculated by solving the equations of stellar structure numerically assuming the star to be in a steady state. The model is then evolved numerically up to the age of the Sun. Any discrepancy from the measured values of the Sun's luminosity, surface abundances, etc. can then be used to refine the model. For example, since the Sun formed, some of the helium and heavy elements have settled out of the photosphere by diffusion. As a result, the Solar photosphere now contains about 87% as much helium and heavy elements as the protostellar photosphere had; the protostellar Solar photosphere was 71.1% hydrogen, 27.4% helium, and 1.5% metals. A measure of heavy-element settling by diffusion is required for a more accurate model.

== Numerical modelling of the stellar structure equations ==
The differential equations of stellar structure, such as the equation of hydrostatic equilibrium, are integrated numerically. The differential equations are approximated by difference equations. The star is imagined to be made up of spherically symmetric shells and the numerical integration carried out in finite steps making use of the equations of state, giving relationships for the pressure, the opacity and the energy generation rate in terms of the density, temperature and composition.

== Evolution of the Sun ==
Evolution of the Sun's luminosity, radius and effective temperature compared to the present Sun. After Ribas (2010).

Nuclear reactions in the core of the Sun change its composition, by converting hydrogen nuclei into helium nuclei by the proton–proton chain and (to a lesser extent in the Sun than in more massive stars) the CNO cycle. This increases the mean molecular weight in the core of the Sun, which should lead to a decrease in pressure. This does not happen as instead the core contracts. By the virial theorem half of the gravitational potential energy released by this contraction goes towards raising the temperature of the core, and the other half is radiated away. This increase in temperature also increases the pressure and restores the balance of hydrostatic equilibrium. The luminosity of the Sun is increased by the temperature rise, increasing the rate of nuclear reactions. The outer layers expand to compensate for the increased temperature and pressure gradients, so the radius also increases.

No star is completely static, but stars stay on the main sequence (burning hydrogen in the core) for long periods. In the case of the Sun, it has been on the main sequence for roughly 4.6 billion years, and will become a red giant in roughly 6.5 billion years for a total main sequence lifetime of roughly 11 billion (10^{10}) years. Thus the assumption of steady state is a very good approximation. For simplicity, the stellar structure equations are written without explicit time dependence, with the exception of the luminosity gradient equation:
$$\frac{dL}{dr} = 4 \pi r^2 \rho \left( \varepsilon - \varepsilon_\nu \right)$$
Here L is the luminosity, ε is the nuclear energy generation rate per unit mass and ε_{ν} is the luminosity due to neutrino emission (see below for the other quantities). The slow evolution of the Sun on the main sequence is then determined by the change in the nuclear species (principally hydrogen being consumed and helium being produced). The rates of the various nuclear reactions are estimated from particle physics experiments at high energies, which are extrapolated back to the lower energies of stellar interiors (the Sun burns hydrogen rather slowly). Historically, errors in the nuclear reaction rates have been one of the biggest sources of error in stellar modelling. Computers are employed to calculate the varying abundances (usually by mass fraction) of the nuclear species. A particular species will have a rate of production and a rate of destruction, so both are needed to calculate its abundance over time, at varying conditions of temperature and density. Since there are many nuclear species, a computerised reaction network is needed to keep track of how all the abundances vary together.

According to the Vogt–Russell theorem, the mass and the composition structure throughout a star uniquely determine its radius, luminosity, and internal structure, as well as its subsequent evolution (though this "theorem" was only intended to apply to the slow, stable phases of stellar evolution and certainly does not apply to the transitions between stages and rapid evolutionary stages). The information about the varying abundances of nuclear species over time, along with the equations of state, is sufficient for a numerical solution by taking sufficiently small time increments and using iteration to find the unique internal structure of the star at each stage.

== Purpose of the standard solar model ==
The SSM serves two purposes:

- it provides estimates for the helium abundance and mixing length parameter by forcing the stellar model to have the correct luminosity and radius at the Sun's age,
- it provides a way to evaluate more complex models with additional physics, such as rotation, magnetic fields and diffusion or improvements to the treatment of convection, such as modelling turbulence, and convective overshooting.

Like the Standard Model of particle physics and the standard cosmology model the SSM changes over time in response to relevant new theoretical or experimental physics discoveries.

== Energy transport in the Sun ==
The Sun has a radiative core and a convective outer envelope. In the core, the luminosity due to nuclear reactions is transmitted to outer layers principally by radiation. However, in the outer layers the temperature gradient is so great that radiation cannot transport enough energy. As a result, thermal convection occurs as thermal columns carry hot material to the surface (photosphere) of the Sun. Once the material cools off at the surface, it plunges back downward to the base of the convection zone, to receive more heat from the top of the radiative zone.

In a solar model, as described in stellar structure, one considers the density $\rho(r)$, temperature T(r), total pressure (matter plus radiation) P(r), luminosity l(r) and energy generation rate per unit mass ε(r) in a spherical shell of a thickness dr at a distance r from the center of the star.

Radiative transport of energy is described by the radiative temperature gradient equation:
$${dT \over dr} = - {3 \kappa \rho l \over 16 \pi r^2 \sigma T^3},$$
where κ is the opacity of the matter, σ is the Stefan–Boltzmann constant, and the Boltzmann constant is set to one.

Convection is described using mixing length theory and the corresponding temperature gradient equation (for adiabatic convection) is:
$${dT \over dr} = \left(1 - {1 \over \gamma} \right) {T \over P } { dP \over dr},$$
where γ = c_{p} / c_{v} is the adiabatic index, the ratio of specific heats in the gas. (For a fully ionized ideal gas, γ = 5/3.)

Near the base of the Sun's convection zone, the convection is adiabatic, but near the surface of the Sun, convection is not adiabatic.

== Simulations of near-surface convection ==
A more realistic description of the uppermost part of the convection zone is possible through detailed three-dimensional and time-dependent hydrodynamical simulations, taking into account radiative transfer in the atmosphere. Such simulations successfully reproduce the observed surface structure of solar granulation, as well as detailed profiles of lines in the solar radiative spectrum, without the use of parametrized models of turbulence. The simulations only cover a very small fraction of the solar radius, and are evidently far too time-consuming to be included in general solar modeling. Extrapolation of an averaged simulation through the adiabatic part of the convection zone by means of a model based on the mixing-length description, demonstrated that the adiabat predicted by the simulation was essentially consistent with the depth of the solar convection zone as determined from helioseismology. An extension of mixing-length theory, including effects of turbulent pressure and kinetic energy, based on numerical simulations of near-surface convection, has been developed.

This section is adapted from the Christensen-Dalsgaard review of helioseismology, Chapter IV.

== Equations of state ==
The numerical solution of the differential equations of stellar structure requires equations of state for the pressure, opacity and energy generation rate, as described in stellar structure, which relate these variables to the density, temperature and composition.

== Helioseismology ==
Helioseismology is the study of the wave oscillations in the Sun. Changes in the propagation of these waves through the Sun reveal inner structures and allow astrophysicists to develop extremely detailed profiles of the interior conditions of the Sun. In particular, the location of the convection zone in the outer layers of the Sun can be measured, and information about the core of the Sun provides a method, using the SSM, to calculate the age of the Sun, independently of the method of inferring the age of the Sun from that of the oldest meteorites. This is another example of how the SSM can be refined.

== Neutrino production ==
Hydrogen is fused into helium through several different interactions in the Sun. The vast majority of neutrinos are produced through the pp chain, a process in which four protons are combined to produce two protons, two neutrons, two positrons, and two electron neutrinos. Neutrinos are also produced by the CNO cycle, but that process is considerably less important in the Sun than in other stars.

Most of the neutrinos produced in the Sun come from the first step of the pp chain but their energy is so low (<0.425 MeV) they are very difficult to detect. A rare side branch of the pp chain produces the "boron-8" neutrinos with a maximum energy of roughly 15 MeV, and these are the easiest neutrinos to detect. A very rare interaction in the pp chain produces the "hep" neutrinos, the highest energy neutrinos predicted to be produced by the Sun. They are predicted to have a maximum energy of about 18 MeV.

All of the interactions described above produce neutrinos with a spectrum of energies. The electron capture of ^{7}Be produces neutrinos at either roughly 0.862 MeV (~90%) or 0.384 MeV (~10%).

== Neutrino detection ==
The weakness of the neutrino's interactions with other particles means that most neutrinos produced in the core of the Sun can pass all the way through the Sun without being absorbed. It is possible, therefore, to observe the core of the Sun directly by detecting these neutrinos.

=== History ===
The first experiment to successfully detect cosmic neutrinos was Ray Davis's chlorine experiment, in which neutrinos were detected by observing the conversion of chlorine nuclei to radioactive argon in a large tank of perchloroethylene. This was a reaction channel expected for neutrinos, but since only the number of argon decays was counted, it did not give any directional information, such as where the neutrinos came from. The experiment found about 1/3 as many neutrinos as were predicted by the standard solar model of the time, and this problem became known as the solar neutrino problem.

While it is now known that the chlorine experiment detected neutrinos, some physicists at the time were suspicious of the experiment, mainly because they did not trust such radiochemical techniques. Unambiguous detection of solar neutrinos was provided by the Kamiokande-II experiment, a water Cherenkov detector with a low enough energy threshold to detect neutrinos through neutrino-electron elastic scattering. In the elastic scattering interaction the electrons coming out of the point of reaction strongly point in the direction that the neutrino was travelling, away from the Sun. This ability to "point back" at the Sun was the first conclusive evidence that the Sun is powered by nuclear interactions in the core. While the neutrinos observed in Kamiokande-II were clearly from the Sun, the rate of neutrino interactions was again suppressed compared to theory at the time. Even worse, the Kamiokande-II experiment measured about 1/2 the predicted flux, rather than the chlorine experiment's 1/3.

The solution to the solar neutrino problem was finally experimentally determined by the Sudbury Neutrino Observatory (SNO). The radiochemical experiments were only sensitive to electron neutrinos, and the signal in the water Cerenkov experiments was dominated by the electron neutrino signal. The SNO experiment, by contrast, had sensitivity to all three neutrino flavours. By simultaneously measuring the electron neutrino and total neutrino fluxes the experiment demonstrated that the suppression was due to the MSW effect, the conversion of electron neutrinos from their pure flavour state into the second neutrino mass eigenstate as they passed through a resonance due to the changing density of the Sun. The resonance is energy dependent, and "turns on" near 2MeV. The water Cherenkov detectors only detect neutrinos above about 5MeV, while the radiochemical experiments were sensitive to lower energy (0.8MeV for chlorine, 0.2MeV for gallium), and this turned out to be the source of the difference in the observed neutrino rates at the two types of experiments.

=== Proton–proton chain ===
All neutrinos from the proton–proton chain reaction (PP neutrinos) have been detected except hep neutrinos (next point). Three techniques have been adopted: The radiochemical technique, used by Homestake, GALLEX, GNO and SAGE allowed to measure the neutrino flux above a minimum energy. The detector SNO used scattering on deuterium that allowed to measure the energy of the events, thereby identifying the single components of the predicted SSM neutrino emission. Finally, Kamiokande, Super-Kamiokande, SNO, Borexino and KamLAND used elastic scattering on electrons, which allows the measurement of the neutrino energy. Boron8 neutrinos have been seen by Kamiokande, Super-Kamiokande, SNO, Borexino, KamLAND. Beryllium7, pep, and PP neutrinos have been seen only by Borexino to date.

=== HEP neutrinos ===
The highest energy neutrinos have not yet been observed due to their small flux compared to the boron-8 neutrinos, so thus far only limits have been placed on the flux. No experiment yet has had enough sensitivity to observe the flux predicted by the SSM.

=== CNO cycle ===
Neutrinos from the CNO cycle of solar energy generation – i.e., the CNO-neutrinos – are also expected to provide observable events below 1 MeV. They have not yet been observed due to experimental noise (background). Ultra-pure scintillator detectors have the potential to probe the flux predicted by the SSM. This detection could be possible already in Borexino; the next scientific occasions will be in SNO+ and, on the longer term, in LENA and JUNO, three detectors that will be larger but will use the same principles of Borexino. The Borexino Collaboration has confirmed that the CNO cycle accounts for 1% of the energy generation within the Sun's core.

=== Future experiments ===
While radiochemical experiments have in some sense observed the pp and Be7 neutrinos they have measured only integral fluxes. The "holy grail" of solar neutrino experiments would detect the Be7 neutrinos with a detector that is sensitive to the individual neutrino energies. This experiment would test the MSW hypothesis by searching for the turn-on of the MSW effect. Some exotic models are still capable of explaining the solar neutrino deficit, so the observation of the MSW turn on would, in effect, finally solve the solar neutrino problem.

== Core temperature prediction ==
The flux of boron-8 neutrinos is highly sensitive to the temperature of the core of the Sun, $\phi(\ce{^8B}) \propto T^{25}$. For this reason, a precise measurement of the boron-8 neutrino flux can be used in the framework of the standard solar model as a measurement of the temperature of the core of the Sun. This estimate was performed by Fiorentini and Ricci after the first SNO results were published, and they obtained a temperature of $T_\text{sun} = 15.7 \times 10^6 \; \text{K} \; \pm 1\%$ from a determined neutrino flux of 5.2 million/cm^{2}·s.

== Lithium depletion at the solar surface ==
Stellar models of the Sun's evolution predict the solar surface chemical abundance pretty well except for lithium (Li). The surface abundance of Li on the Sun is 140 times less than the protosolar value (i.e. the primordial abundance at the Sun's birth), yet the temperature at the base of the surface convective zone is not hot enough to burn – and hence deplete – Li. This is known as the solar lithium problem. A large range of Li abundances is observed in solar-type stars of the same age, mass, and metallicity as the Sun. Observations of an unbiased sample of stars of this type with or without observed planets (exoplanets) showed that the known planet-bearing stars have less than one per cent of the primordial Li abundance, and of the remainder half had ten times as much Li. It is hypothesised that the presence of planets may increase the amount of mixing and deepen the convective zone to such an extent that the Li can be burned. A possible mechanism for this is the idea that the planets affect the angular momentum evolution of the star, thus changing the rotation of the star relative to similar stars without planets; in the case of the Sun slowing its rotation. More research is needed to discover where and when the fault in the modelling lies. Given the precision of helioseismic probes of the interior of the modern-day Sun, it is likely that the modelling of the protostellar Sun needs to be adjusted.

== See also ==
- Protostar
