= Baksan Neutrino Observatory =

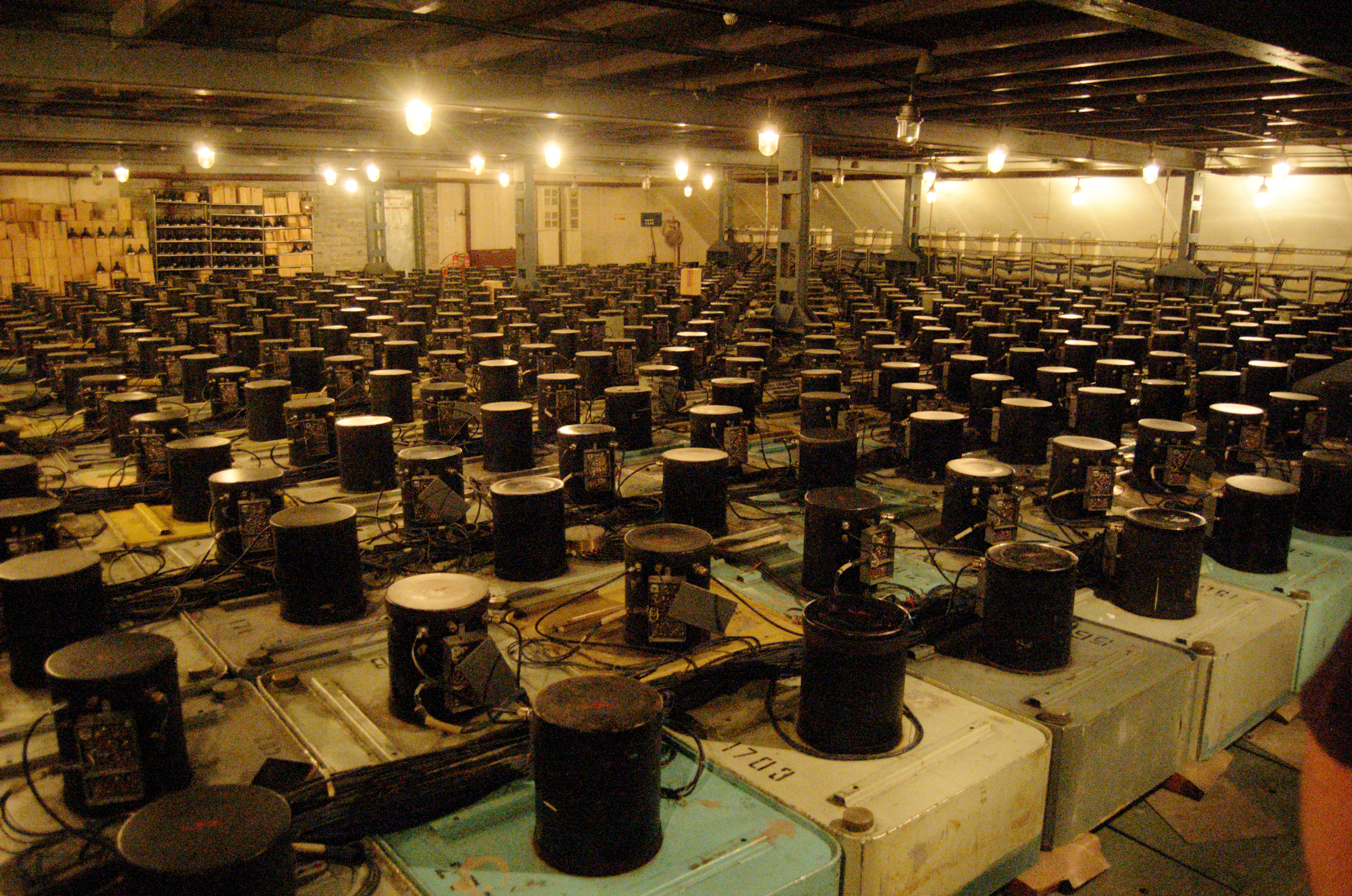
- Alternative names: BNO
- Named after: Verkhny Baksan
- Organization: Institute for Nuclear Research, Russian Academy of Sciences
- Location: Baksan River
- Coordinates: 43°16′32″N 42°41′25″E
- Established: 1977
- Website: www.inr.ru/bno.html

Telescopes
- Telescope: Neutrino
- Location within Russia
- Related media on Commons

The Baksan Neutrino Observatory (BNO; Baksan is sometimes spelled Baxan) is a scientific laboratory of INR RAS located in the Baksan River gorge in the Caucasus mountains in Russia. Cleared for building in 1967, it started operations in 1977, becoming the first such neutrino observatory in the USSR. It consists of the Baksan Underground Scintillation Telescope (BUST), located 300 m (980 ft) below the surface, the gallium–germanium neutrino telescope (Soviet–American Gallium Experiment, SAGE) located 4,700 m.w.e. deep (2,100 meters) as well as a number of ground facilities. The Baksan Experiment on Sterile Transitions (BEST) is currently (2019) being conducted at Baksan with aims of understanding sterile neutrinos.

The laboratory itself is located in a 4,000 meter long horizontal tunnel mined specifically for this purpose; this is in contrast to most underground physics laboratories which are placed in abandoned or still in-use mines. The entrance of the tunnel is at a valley at 1,700 meters high from sea level and the tunnel itself is located under the 4,000 meters tall mountain Mount Andyrchi. A small town named Neutrino was built in the valley, in conjunction with the construction of the laboratory, to house the scientists and their families.

The first experiment undertaken at BNO was not underground; it was the Carpet (Russian: Ковёр) air-shower cosmic ray experiment in 1973. Carpet relied on liquid scintillator detectors to study cosmic ray air showers. Carpet also made discoveries of astrophysical importance, such as detecting a giant flare in the Crab Nebula in 1989. The Carpet cosmic ray experiment continues as of 2017, and it is being upgraded to use a gamma-ray telescope. Further upgrades are also planned.

The first underground experiment, the BUST, started in 1977. It is located 550 meters from the tunnel entrance. It detected neutrinos from the SN1987A supernova. It continues to operate (as of 2017).

The next experiment at BNO was the Gallium-Germanium Neutrino Telescope (GGNT) as part of the SAGE experiment. It is located 3,500 meters from the tunnel entrance. It started in 1986 and was still in operation as of 2017.

In addition to the big experiments BUST and SAGE, a number of smaller experiments that benefit from the low-background location have taken place at BNO; for example, the isotopic composition of the lunar samples brought by Luna 16, Luna 20 and Luna 24 spacecraft was measured in BNO.

BNO is also home to the Andyrchi air-shower array, located on the surface above BUST in the mountain slope. The array and BUST work in concert. BNO hosts also a small gravitational-wave detector, OGRAN. OGRAN would be capable of registering a galactic supernova, should one occur in the Milky Way.

The BNO-observatory is planning (as of 2021) a new major detector, the Baksan Large Underground Scintillation Telescope (BLUST). This detector would consist of huge (10 kilotonnes) amounts of liquid scintillator. It would be located at the end of the laboratory tunnel. It would mainly detect neutrinos.

As of 2017, the director of the observatory is Valery Kuzminov.

== See also ==
- Baikal Deep Underwater Neutrino Telescope
- IceCube Neutrino Observatory
