= Sudbury Neutrino Observatory =

Underground laboratory in Ontario, Canada

Coordinates: 46°28′30″N 81°12′04″W

The Sudbury Neutrino Observatory (SNO) was a neutrino observatory located 2100 m underground in Vale's Creighton Mine in Sudbury, Ontario, Canada. The detector was designed to detect solar neutrinos through their interactions with a large tank of heavy water.

The detector was turned on in May 1999, and was turned off on 28 November 2006. The SNO collaboration was active for several years after that analyzing the data taken.

The director of the experiment, Art McDonald, was co-awarded the Nobel Prize in Physics in 2015 for the experiment's contribution to the discovery of neutrino oscillation.

The underground laboratory has been enlarged into a permanent facility and now operates multiple experiments as SNOLAB. The SNO equipment itself was being refurbished as of February 2017 for use in the SNO+ experiment.

== Experimental motivation ==
The first measurements of the number of solar neutrinos reaching the Earth were taken in the 1960s, and all experiments prior to SNO observed a third to a half fewer neutrinos than were predicted by the Standard Solar Model. As several experiments confirmed this deficit the effect became known as the solar neutrino problem. Over several decades many ideas were put forward to try to explain the effect, one of which was the hypothesis of neutrino oscillations. All of the solar neutrino detectors prior to SNO had been sensitive primarily or exclusively to electron neutrinos and yielded little to no information on muon neutrinos and tau neutrinos.

In 1984, Herb Chen of the University of California, Irvine first pointed out the advantages of using heavy water as a detector for solar neutrinos. Unlike previous detectors, using heavy water would make the detector sensitive to two reactions, one reaction sensitive to all neutrino flavours, the other reaction sensitive to only electron neutrino. Thus, such a detector could measure neutrino oscillations directly. A location in Canada was attractive because Atomic Energy of Canada Limited, which maintains large stockpiles of heavy water to support its CANDU reactor power plants, was willing to lend the necessary amount (worth CA$330,000,000 at market prices) at no cost.

The Creighton Mine in Sudbury is among the deepest in the world and, accordingly, experiences a very small background flux of radiation. It was quickly identified as an ideal place for Chen's proposed experiment to be built, and the mine management was willing to make the location available for only incremental costs.

The SNO collaboration held its first meeting in 1984. At the time it competed with TRIUMF's KAON Factory proposal for federal funding, and the wide variety of universities backing SNO quickly led to it being selected for development. The official go-ahead was given in 1990.

The experiment observed the light produced by relativistic electrons in the water created by neutrino interactions. As relativistic electrons travel through a medium, they lose energy producing a cone of blue light through the Cherenkov effect, and it is this light that is directly detected.

== Detector description ==
The Sudbury Neutrino Detector (Courtesy of SNO)

A wide-angle view of the detector interior (Courtesy of SNO)

The SNO detector target consisted of 1,000 tonnes (1,102 short tons) of heavy water contained in a 6-metre-radius (20 ft) acrylic vessel. The detector cavity outside the vessel was filled with normal water to provide both buoyancy for the vessel and radiation shielding. The heavy water was viewed by approximately 9,600 photomultiplier tubes (PMTs) mounted on a geodesic sphere at a radius of about 850 centimetres (28 ft). The cavity housing the detector was the largest in the world at such a depth, requiring a variety of high-performance rock bolting techniques to prevent rock bursts. The mining was completed in May 1993.

The observatory is located at the end of a 1.5-kilometre-long (0.9 mi) drift, named the "SNO drift", isolating it from other mining operations. Along the drift are a number of operations and equipment rooms, all held in a clean room setting. Most of the facility is Class 3000 (fewer than 3,000 particles of 1 μm or larger per 1 ft^{3} of air) but the final cavity containing the detector is an even stricter Class 100.

=== Charged current interaction ===
In the charged current interaction, a neutrino converts the neutron in a deuteron to a proton. The neutrino is absorbed in the reaction and an electron is produced. Solar neutrinos have energies smaller than the mass of muons and tau leptons, so only electron neutrinos can participate in this reaction. The emitted electron carries off most of the neutrino's energy, on the order of 5–15 MeV, and is detectable. The proton which is produced does not have enough energy to be detected easily. The electrons produced in this reaction are emitted in all directions, but there is a slight tendency for them to point back in the direction from which the neutrino came.

=== Neutral current interaction ===
In the neutral current interaction, a neutrino dissociates the deuteron, breaking it into its constituent neutron and proton. The neutrino continues on with slightly less energy, and all three neutrino flavours are equally likely to participate in this interaction. Heavy water has a small cross section for neutrons, but when neutrons are captured by a deuterium nucleus, a gamma ray (photon) with roughly 6 MeV of energy is produced. The direction of the gamma ray is completely uncorrelated with the direction of the neutrino. Some of the neutrons produced from the dissociated deuterons make their way through the acrylic vessel into the light water jacket surrounding the heavy water, and since light water has a very large cross section for neutron capture, these neutrons are captured very quickly. Gamma rays of roughly 2.2 MeV are produced in this reaction, but because the energy of the photons is less than the detector's energy threshold (meaning they do not trigger the photomultipliers), they are not directly observable. However, when the gamma ray collides with an electron via Compton scattering, the accelerated electron can be detected through Cherenkov radiation.

=== Electron elastic scattering ===
In the elastic scattering interaction, a neutrino collides with an atomic electron and imparts some of its energy to the electron. All three neutrinos can participate in this interaction through the exchange of the neutral Z boson, and electron neutrinos can also participate with the exchange of a charged W boson. For this reason this interaction is dominated by electron neutrinos, and this is the channel through which the Super-Kamiokande (Super-K) detector can observe solar neutrinos. This interaction is the relativistic equivalent of billiards, and for this reason the electrons produced usually point in the direction that the neutrino was travelling (away from the sun). Because this interaction takes place on atomic electrons it occurs with the same rate in both the heavy and light water.

== Experimental results and impact ==
The first scientific results of SNO were published on 18 June 2001, and presented the first clear evidence that neutrinos oscillate (i.e. that they can transmute into one another), as they travel from the Sun. This oscillation, in turn, implies that neutrinos have non-zero masses. The total flux of all neutrino flavours measured by SNO agrees well with theoretical predictions. Further measurements carried out by SNO have since confirmed and improved the precision of the original result.

Although Super-K had beaten SNO to the punch, having published evidence for neutrino oscillation as early as 1998, the Super-K results were not conclusive and did not specifically deal with solar neutrinos. SNO's results were the first to directly demonstrate oscillations in solar neutrinos. This was important to the standard solar model. In 2007, the Franklin Institute awarded the director of SNO Art McDonald with the Benjamin Franklin Medal in Physics. In 2015 the Nobel Prize for Physics was jointly awarded to Arthur B. McDonald, and Takaaki Kajita of the University of Tokyo, for the discovery of neutrino oscillations.

== Other analyses ==
The SNO detector would have been capable of detecting a supernova within our galaxy if one had occurred while the detector was online. As neutrinos emitted by a supernova are released earlier than the photons, it is possible to alert the astronomical community before the supernova is visible. SNO was a founding member of the Supernova Early Warning System (SNEWS) with Super-Kamiokande and the Large Volume Detector. No such supernovae have yet been detected.

The SNO experiment was also able to observe atmospheric neutrinos produced by cosmic ray interactions in the atmosphere. Due to the limited size of the SNO detector in comparison with Super-K, the low cosmic ray neutrino signal is not statistically significant at neutrino energies below 1 GeV.

The experiment published a search for possible signals of neutron-antineutron oscillations, for neutrons bound in nuclei. For this particular research the deuteron is the ideal target nucleus.

== Nickel refining ==
CVMR (Chemical Vapour Metal Refining; a form of chemical vapor deposition) played a significant role in the development of the SNO. The neutron detectors required approximately 1,200 nickel tubes with extremely low concentrations of radioactive impurities such as uranium and thorium. Studies on the project confirm that the use of CVMR nickel reduced radioactive contaminants by up to six orders of magnitude, ensuring the required radiopurity for neutrino measurements.

== Participating institutions ==
Large particle physics experiments require large collaborations. With approximately 100 collaborators, SNO was a rather small group compared to collider experiments. The participating institutions have included:

=== Canada ===
- Carleton University
- Laurentian University
- Queen's University – designed and built many calibration sources and the device for deploying sources
- TRIUMF
- University of British Columbia
- University of Guelph

Although no longer a collaborating institution, Chalk River Laboratories led the construction of the acrylic vessel that holds the heavy water, and Atomic Energy of Canada Limited was the source of the heavy water.

=== United Kingdom ===
- University of Oxford – developed much of the experiment's Monte Carlo analysis program (SNOMAN), and maintained the program
- University of Sussex – calibration

=== United States ===
- Lawrence Berkeley National Laboratory (LBNL) – Led the construction of the geodesic structure that holds the PMTs
- Pacific Northwest National Laboratory (PNNL)
- Los Alamos National Laboratory (LANL)
- University of Pennsylvania – designed and built the front end electronics and trigger
- University of Washington – designed and built proportional counter tubes for detection of neutrons in the third phase of the experiment
- Brookhaven National Laboratory
- University of Texas at Austin
- Massachusetts Institute of Technology

== Honours and awards ==
- Asteroid 14724 SNO is named in honour of SNO.
- In November 2006, the entire SNO team was awarded the inaugural John C. Polanyi Award for "a recent outstanding advance in any field of the natural sciences or engineering" conducted in Canada.
- SNO principal investigator Arthur B. McDonald won the 2015 Nobel Prize in Physics, jointly with Takaaki Kajita of Super-Kamiokande, for the discovery of neutrino oscillation.
- SNO was awarded the 2016 Fundamental Physics Prize along with 4 other neutrino experiments.

== See also ==
- DEAP – Dark Matter Experiment using Argon Pulse-shape at SNO location
- Homestake experiment – A predecessor experiment conducted 1970–1994 in a mine at Lead, South Dakota
- SNO+ – The successor of SNO
- SNOLAB – A permanent underground physics laboratory being built around SNO
