= Homestake experiment =

1960s US underground experiment to count solar neutrinos

Coordinates: 44°21′12″N 103°44′39″W

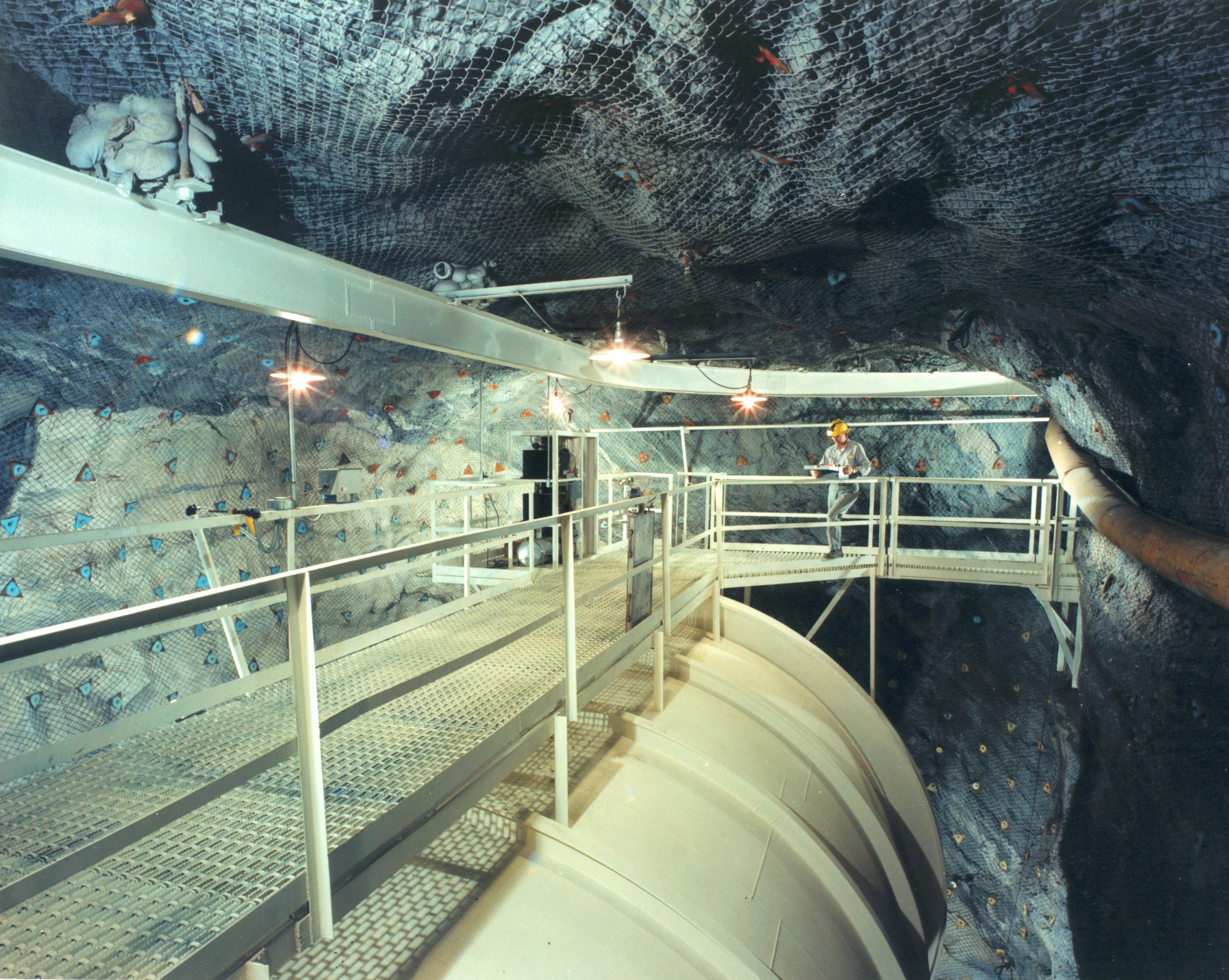
The underground tank of the Homestake experiment when the basin around the tank has not yet been flooded.

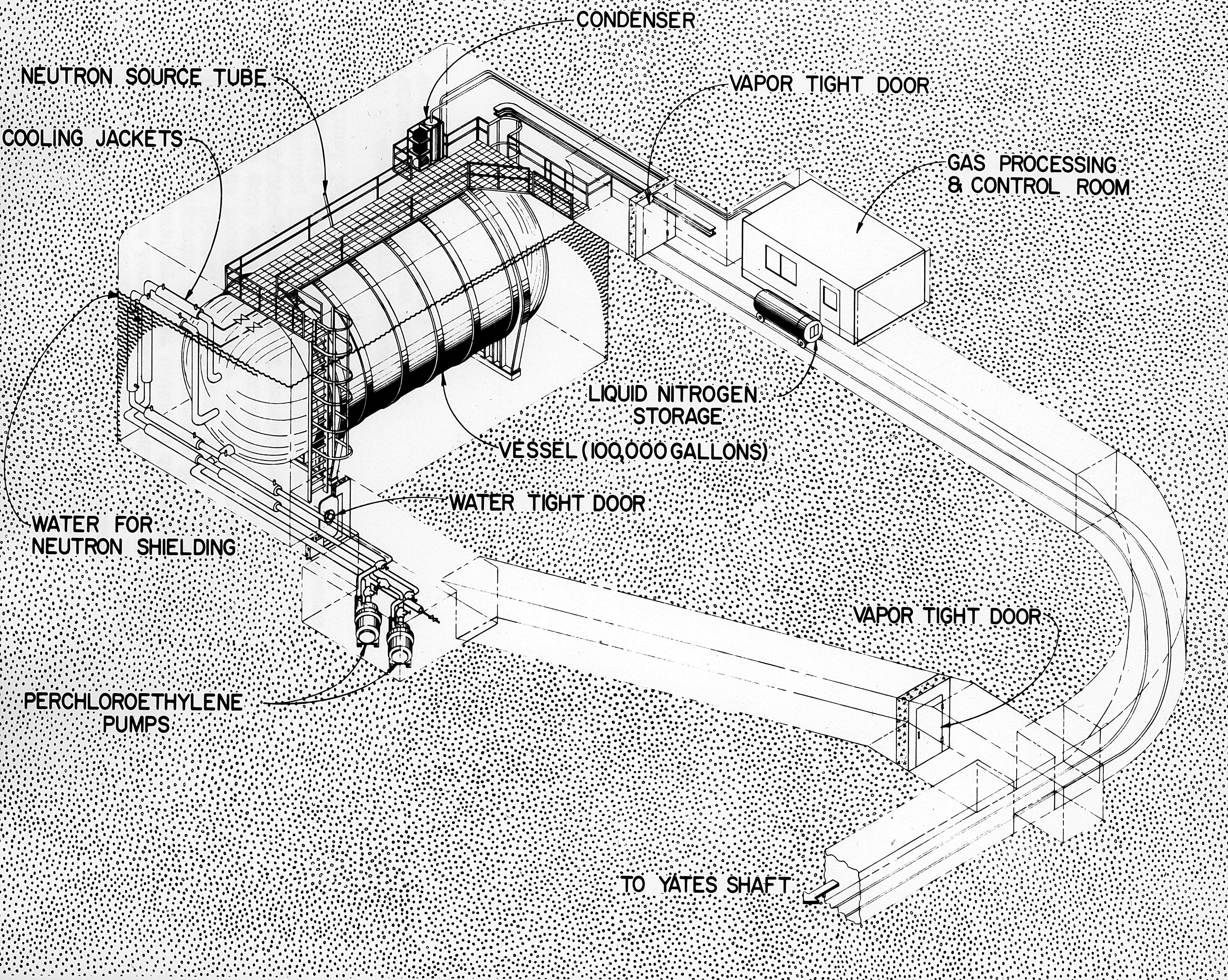
Setup of the experiment in the Homestake mine.

The Homestake experiment (sometimes referred to as the Davis experiment or Solar Neutrino Experiment and in original literature called Brookhaven Solar Neutrino Experiment or Brookhaven ^{37}Cl (Chlorine) Experiment) was an experiment headed by astrophysicists Raymond Davis, Jr. and John N. Bahcall in the late 1960s. Its purpose was to collect and count neutrinos emitted by nuclear fusion taking place in the Sun. Bahcall performed the theoretical calculations and Davis designed the experiment. After Bahcall calculated the rate at which the detector should capture neutrinos, Davis's experiment turned up only one third of this figure. The experiment was the first to successfully detect and count solar neutrinos, and the discrepancy in results created the solar neutrino problem. The experiment operated continuously from 1970 until 1994. The University of Pennsylvania took it over in 1984. The discrepancy between the predicted and measured rates of neutrino detection was later found to be due to neutrino "flavour" oscillations.

== Methodology ==
The experiment took place in the Homestake Gold Mine in Lead, South Dakota. Davis placed a 380 cubic meter (100,000 gallon) tank of perchloroethylene, a common dry-cleaning fluid, 1,478 meters (4,850 feet) underground. A big target deep underground was needed to prevent interference from cosmic rays, taking into account the very small probability of a successful neutrino capture, and, therefore, very low effect rate even with the huge mass of the target. Perchloroethylene was chosen because it is rich in chlorine. Upon interaction with an electron neutrino, a ^{37}Cl atom transforms into a radioactive isotope of ^{37}Ar, which can then be extracted and counted. The reaction of the neutrino capture is

$\mathrm{\nu_e + \ ^{37}Cl \longrightarrow \ ^{37}Ar^+ + e^-.}$

The reaction threshold is 0.814 MeV, i.e. the neutrino should have at least this energy to be captured by the ^{37}Cl nucleus.

Because ^{37}Ar has a half-life of 35 days, every few weeks, Davis bubbled helium through the tank to collect the argon that had formed. A small (few cubic cm) gas counter was filled by the collected few tens of atoms of ^{37}Ar (together with the stable argon) to detect its decays. In such a way, Davis was able to determine how many neutrinos had been captured.

== Conclusions ==
Davis' figures were consistently very close to one-third of Bahcall's calculations. The first response from the scientific community was that either Bahcall or Davis had made a mistake. Bahcall's calculations were checked repeatedly, with no errors found. Davis scrutinized his own experiment and insisted there was nothing wrong with it. The Homestake experiment was followed by other experiments with the same purpose, such as Kamiokande in Japan, SAGE in the former Soviet Union, GALLEX in Italy, Super Kamiokande, also in Japan, and SNO (Sudbury Neutrino Observatory) in Ontario, Canada. SNO was the first detector able to detect neutrino oscillation, solving the solar neutrino problem. The results of the experiment, published in 2001, revealed that of the three "flavours" between which neutrinos are able to oscillate, Davis's detector was sensitive to only one. After it had been proven that his experiment was sound, Davis shared the 2002 Nobel Prize in Physics for contributions to neutrino physics with Masatoshi Koshiba of Japan, who worked on the Kamiokande and the Super Kamiokande (the prize was also shared with Riccardo Giacconi for his contributions to x-ray astronomy).

== See also ==
- Cowan–Reines neutrino experiment (a previous experiment by Reines and Cowan which discovered the antineutrino)
- Sanford Underground Research Facility
