= Neutrino oscillation =

Phenomenon in which a neutrino changes lepton flavor as it travels

Neutrino oscillation is a quantum mechanical phenomenon in which a neutrino created with a specific lepton family number ("lepton flavor": electron, muon, or tau) can later be measured to have a different lepton family number. The probability of measuring a particular flavor for a neutrino varies between three known states as it propagates through space.

First predicted by Bruno Pontecorvo in 1957, neutrino oscillation has since been observed by a multitude of experiments in several different contexts. Most notably, the existence of neutrino oscillation resolved the long-standing solar neutrino problem.

Neutrino oscillation is of great theoretical and experimental interest, as the precise properties of the process can shed light on several properties of the neutrino. In particular, it implies that the neutrino has a non-zero mass, which requires a modification to the Standard Model of particle physics. The experimental discovery of neutrino oscillation, and thus neutrino mass, by the Super-Kamiokande Observatory and the Sudbury Neutrino Observatories was recognized with the 2015 Nobel Prize for Physics.

== Observations ==
A great deal of evidence for neutrino oscillation has been collected from many sources, over a wide range of neutrino energies and with many different detector technologies. The 2015 Nobel Prize in Physics was shared by Takaaki Kajita and Arthur B. McDonald for their early pioneering observations of these oscillations.

Neutrino oscillation is a function of the ratio L/E, where L is the distance traveled and E is the neutrino's energy (details in § Propagation and interference below). All available neutrino sources produce a range of energies, and oscillation is measured at a fixed distance for neutrinos of varying energy. The limiting factor in measurements is the accuracy with which the energy of each observed neutrino can be measured. Because current detectors have energy uncertainties of a few percent, it is satisfactory to know the distance to within 1%.

=== Solar neutrino oscillation ===
The first experiment that detected the effects of neutrino oscillation was Ray Davis' Homestake experiment in the late 1960s, in which he observed a deficit in the flux of solar neutrinos with respect to the prediction of the Standard Solar Model, using a chlorine-based detector. This gave rise to the solar neutrino problem. Many subsequent radiochemical and water Cherenkov detectors confirmed the deficit, but neutrino oscillation was not conclusively identified as the source of the deficit until the Sudbury Neutrino Observatory provided clear evidence of neutrino flavor change in 2001.

Solar neutrinos have energies below 20 MeV. At energies above 5 MeV, solar neutrino oscillation actually takes place in the Sun through a resonance known as the MSW effect, a different process from the vacuum oscillation described later in this article.

=== Atmospheric neutrino oscillation ===
Following the theories that were proposed in the 1970s suggesting unification of electromagnetic, weak, and strong forces, a few experiments on proton decay followed in the 1980s. Large detectors such as IMB, MACRO, and Kamiokande II have observed a deficit in the ratio of the flux of muon to electron flavor atmospheric neutrinos (see Muon § Muon decay). The Super-Kamiokande experiment provided a very precise measurement of neutrino oscillation in an energy range of hundreds of MeV to a few TeV, and with a baseline of the diameter of the Earth; the first experimental evidence for atmospheric neutrino oscillations was announced in 1998.

=== Reactor neutrino oscillation ===
Illustration of neutrino oscillations.

Many experiments have searched for oscillation of electron anti-neutrinos produced in nuclear reactors. No oscillations were found until a detector was installed at a distance of 1–2 km. Such oscillations give the value of the parameter θ_{13}. Neutrinos produced in nuclear reactors have energies similar to solar neutrinos, of around a few MeV. The baselines of these experiments have ranged from tens of meters to over 100 km (parameter θ_{12}). Mikaelyan and Sinev proposed to use two identical detectors to cancel systematic uncertainties in reactor experiment to measure the parameter θ_{13}.

In December 2011, the Double Chooz experiment indicated that θ_{13} ≠ 0. Then, in 2012, the Daya Bay experiment found that θ_{13} ≠ 0 with a significance of 5.2 σ; these results have since been confirmed by RENO.

The experiment Neutrino-4 started in 2014 with a detector model and continued with a full-scale detector in 2016–2021 obtained the result of the direct observation of the oscillation effect at parameter region Δm^{2}_{14} = (7.3 ± 0.13_{st} ± 1.16_{syst}) (eV/c^{2})^{2} and sin^{2}2θ_{14} = 0.36 ± 0.12_{stat} (2.9 σ). The simulation showed the expected detector signal for the case of oscillation detection.

=== Beam neutrino oscillation ===
Neutrino beams produced at a particle accelerator offer the greatest control over the neutrinos being studied. Many experiments have taken place that study the same oscillations as in atmospheric neutrino oscillation using neutrinos with a few GeV of energy and several-hundred-kilometre baselines. The MINOS, K2K, and Super-K experiments have all independently observed muon neutrino disappearance over such long baselines.

Data from the LSND experiment appear to be in conflict with the oscillation parameters measured in other experiments. Results from the MiniBooNE appeared in Spring 2007 and contradicted the results from LSND, although they could support the existence of a fourth neutrino type, the sterile neutrino.

In 2010, the INFN and CERN announced the observation of a tauon particle in a muon neutrino beam in the OPERA detector located at Gran Sasso, 730 km away from the source in Geneva.

T2K, using a neutrino beam directed through 295 km of earth and the Super-Kamiokande detector, measured a non-zero value for the parameter θ_{13} in a neutrino beam. NOνA, using the same beam as MINOS with a baseline of 810 km, is sensitive to the same.

==== ESSνSB (proposal) ====
The European Spallation Source neutrino Super Beam (ESSνSB) is a proposed accelerator-based experiment that would use the 2 GeV, 5 MW proton linear accelerator at the European Spallation Source in Lund, Sweden, to generate the world’s most intense ν_μ beam. By aiming the beam at a ≈360 km-distant megaton-scale water-Cherenkov detector, ESSνSB targets the **second neutrino-oscillation maximum**, where reduced systematic uncertainties allow a precision better than 8° on the leptonic CP-violating phase δ_{CP}. An extension project, ESSνSB+ (2023 – 2026), is preparing auxiliary low-energy facilities—including **LEnuSTORM** and a Low-Energy Monitored Neutrino Beam—to deliver percent-level ν–nucleus cross-section data that will control systematic uncertainties for the long-baseline programme.

== Theory ==
Neutrino oscillation arises from mixing between the flavor and mass eigenstates of neutrinos. That is, the three neutrino states that interact with the charged leptons in weak interactions are each a different superposition of the three (propagating) neutrino states of definite mass. Neutrinos are produced and detected in weak interactions as flavour eigenstates (Note: More formally, the neutrinos are emitted in an entangled state with the other bodies in the decay or reaction, and the mixed state is properly described by a density matrix. However, for all practical situations, the other particles in the decay may be well localized in time and space (e.g. to within a nuclear distance), leaving their momentum with a large spread. When these partner states are projected out, the neutrino is left in a state that for all intents and purposes behaves as the simple superposition of mass states described here. For more information, see Cohen, Glashow & Ligeti (2009).) but propagate as coherent superpositions of mass eigenstates.

As a neutrino superposition propagates through space, the quantum mechanical phases of the three neutrino mass states advance at slightly different rates, due to the slight differences in their respective masses. This results in a changing superposition mixture of mass eigenstates as the neutrino travels; but a different mixture of mass eigenstates corresponds to a different mixture of flavor states. For example, a neutrino born as an electron neutrino will be some mixture of electron, mu, and tau neutrino after traveling some distance. Since the quantum mechanical phase advances in a periodic fashion, after some distance the state will nearly return to the original mixture, and the neutrino will be again mostly electron neutrino. The electron flavor content of the neutrino will then continue to oscillate – as long as the quantum mechanical state maintains coherence. Since mass differences between neutrino flavors are small in comparison with long coherence lengths for neutrino oscillations, this microscopic quantum effect becomes observable over macroscopic distances.

In contrast, due to their larger masses, the charged leptons (electrons, muons, and tau leptons) have never been observed to oscillate. In nuclear beta decay, muon decay, pion decay, and kaon decay, when a neutrino and a charged lepton are emitted, the charged lepton is emitted in incoherent mass eigenstates such as | e^{−} ⟩, because of its large mass. Weak-force couplings compel the simultaneously emitted neutrino to be in a "charged-lepton-centric" superposition such as | ν̅_{e} ⟩, which is an eigenstate for a "flavor" that is fixed by the electron's mass eigenstate, and not in one of the neutrino's own mass eigenstates. Because the neutrino is in a coherent superposition that is not a mass eigenstate, the mixture that makes up that superposition oscillates significantly as it travels. No analogous mechanism exists in the Standard Model that would make charged leptons detectably oscillate. In the four decays mentioned above, where the charged lepton is emitted in a unique mass eigenstate, the charged lepton will not oscillate, as single mass eigenstates propagate without oscillation.

The case of (real) W boson decay is more complicated: W boson decay is sufficiently energetic to generate a charged lepton that is not in a mass eigenstate; however, the charged lepton would lose coherence, if it had any, over interatomic distances (0.1 nm) and would thus quickly cease any meaningful oscillation. More importantly, no mechanism in the Standard Model is capable of pinning down a charged lepton into a coherent state that is not a mass eigenstate, in the first place; instead, while the charged lepton from the W boson decay is not initially in a mass eigenstate, neither is it in any "neutrino-centric" eigenstate, nor in any other coherent state. It cannot meaningfully be said that such a featureless charged lepton oscillates or that it does not oscillate, as any "oscillation" transformation would just leave it the same generic state that it was before the oscillation. Therefore, detection of a charged lepton oscillation from W boson decay is infeasible on multiple levels.

=== Pontecorvo–Maki–Nakagawa–Sakata matrix ===
The idea of neutrino oscillation was first put forward in 1957 by Bruno Pontecorvo, who proposed that neutrino–antineutrino transitions may occur in analogy with neutral kaon mixing. Although such matter–antimatter oscillation had not been observed, this idea formed the conceptual foundation for the quantitative theory of neutrino flavor oscillation, which was first developed by Maki, Nakagawa, and Sakata in 1962 and further elaborated by Pontecorvo in 1967. One year later the solar neutrino deficit was first observed, and that was followed by the famous article by Gribov and Pontecorvo published in 1969 titled "Neutrino astronomy and lepton charge".

The concept of neutrino mixing is a natural outcome of gauge theories with massive neutrinos, and its structure can be characterized in general. In its simplest form it is expressed as a unitary transformation relating the flavor and mass eigenbasis and can be written as

$$\left| \nu_i \right\rangle = \sum_{\alpha} U^*_{\alpha i} \left| \nu_\alpha \right\rangle$$
$$\left| \nu_\alpha \right\rangle = \sum_{i} U_{\alpha i} \left| \nu_i \right\rangle$$

where

$\ \left| \nu_\alpha \right\rangle$ is a neutrino with definite flavor $\alpha$ = e (electron), μ (muon) or τ (tauon)
$\ \left| \nu_i \right\rangle$ is a neutrino with definite mass $m_i$ with $i$ = 1, 2 or 3
the superscript asterisk ($^*$) represents a complex conjugate; for antineutrinos, the complex conjugate should be removed from the first equation and inserted into the second.

The symbol $U_{\alpha i}$ represents the Pontecorvo–Maki–Nakagawa–Sakata matrix (also called the PMNS matrix, lepton mixing matrix, or sometimes simply the MNS matrix). It is the analogue of the CKM matrix describing the analogous mixing of quarks. If this matrix were the identity matrix, then the flavor eigenstates would be the same as the mass eigenstates. However, experiment shows that it is not.

When the standard three-neutrino theory is considered, the matrix is 3 × 3. If only two neutrinos are considered, a 2 × 2 matrix is used. If one or more sterile neutrinos are added (see later), it is 4 × 4 or larger. In the 3 × 3 form, it is given by

$$\begin{align}
U &= \begin{bmatrix}
U_{e 1} & U_{e 2} & U_{e 3} \\
U_{\mu 1} & U_{\mu 2} & U_{\mu 3} \\
U_{\tau 1} & U_{\tau 2} & U_{\tau 3}
\end{bmatrix} \\
&= \begin{bmatrix}
1 & 0 & 0 \\
0 & c_{23} & s_{23} \\
0 & -s_{23} & c_{23}
\end{bmatrix}
\begin{bmatrix}
c_{13} & 0 & s_{13} e^{-i\delta} \\
0 & 1 & 0 \\
-s_{13} e^{i\delta} & 0 & c_{13}
\end{bmatrix}
\begin{bmatrix}
c_{12} & s_{12} & 0 \\
-s_{12} & c_{12} & 0 \\
0 & 0 & 1
\end{bmatrix}
\begin{bmatrix}
e^{i\alpha_1 / 2} & 0 & 0 \\
0 & e^{i\alpha_2 / 2} & 0 \\
0 & 0 & 1 \\
\end{bmatrix} \\
&= \begin{bmatrix}
c_{12} c_{13} & s_{12} c_{13} & s_{13} e^{-i\delta} \\
- s_{12} c_{23} - c_{12} s_{23} s_{13} e^{i \delta} & c_{12} c_{23} - s_{12} s_{23} s_{13} e^{i \delta} & s_{23} c_{13}\\
s_{12} s_{23} - c_{12} c_{23} s_{13} e^{i \delta} & - c_{12} s_{23} - s_{12} c_{23} s_{13} e^{i \delta} & c_{23} c_{13}
\end{bmatrix}
\begin{bmatrix}
e^{i\alpha_1 / 2} & 0 & 0 \\
0 & e^{i\alpha_2 / 2} & 0 \\
0 & 0 & 1 \\
\end{bmatrix},
\end{align}$$

where c_{ij} ≡ cos θ_{ij}, and s_{ij} ≡ sin θ_{ij}. The phase factors α_{1} and α_{2} are physically meaningful only if neutrinos are Majorana particles—i.e. if the neutrino is identical to its antineutrino (whether or not they are is unknown)—and do not enter into oscillation phenomena regardless. If neutrinoless double beta decay occurs, these factors influence its rate. The phase factor δ is non-zero only if neutrino oscillation violates CP symmetry; this has not yet been observed experimentally. If experiment shows this 3 × 3 matrix to be not unitary, a sterile neutrino or some other new physics is required.

=== Propagation and interference ===
Since $\left|\, \nu_j \,\right\rangle$ are mass eigenstates, their propagation can be described by plane wave solutions of the form

$$\left|\, \nu_j(t) \,\right\rangle = e^{-i\,\left(\, E_j t \,-\, \vec{p}_j \cdot \vec{x} \,\right) } \left|\, \nu_j(0) \,\right\rangle ~,$$

where

- quantities are expressed in natural units ($c = 1, \hbar = 1$), and $i^2 \equiv -1$,
- $E_j$ is the energy of the mass-eigenstate $j$,
- $t$ is the time from the start of the propagation,
- $\vec{p}_j$ is the three-dimensional momentum,
- $\vec{x}$ is the current position of the particle relative to its starting position

In the ultrarelativistic limit, $\left|\vec{p}_j\right| = p_j \gg m_j,$ we can approximate the energy as

$$E_j = \sqrt{\, p_j^2 + m_j^2 \;} \simeq p_j + \frac{ m_j^2 }{\, 2\,p_j \,} \approx E + \frac{ m_j^2 }{\, 2\,E \,} ~,$$

where E is the energy of the wavepacket (particle) to be detected.

This limit applies to all practical (currently observed) neutrinos, since their masses are less than 1 eV and their energies are at least 1 MeV, so the Lorentz factor, γ, is greater than 10^{6} in all cases. Using also t ≈ L, where L is the distance traveled and also dropping the phase factors, the wavefunction becomes

$$\left| \,\nu_j(L) \,\right\rangle = e^{-im_j^2L/{(2E)}} \, \left| \, \nu_j(0) \, \right\rangle .$$

Eigenstates with different masses propagate with different frequencies. The heavier ones oscillate faster compared to the lighter ones. Since the mass eigenstates are combinations of flavor eigenstates, this difference in frequencies causes interference between the corresponding flavor components of each mass eigenstate. Constructive interference causes it to be possible to observe a neutrino created with a given flavor to change its flavor during its propagation. The probability that a neutrino originally of flavor α will later be observed as having flavor β is

$$P_{\alpha\rightarrow\beta} \, = \, \Bigl|\, \left\langle\, \left. \nu_\beta \, \right| \, \nu_\alpha (L) \, \right\rangle \,\Bigr|^2 \, =\,  \left|\,  \sum_j\, U_{\alpha j}^*\, U_{\beta j}\,e^{-im_j^2L/(2E)} \, \right|^2 ~.$$

This is more conveniently written as

$$\begin{align}
P_{\alpha\rightarrow\beta} = \delta_{\alpha\beta}
&{}- 4\,\sum_{j>k} \,\operatorname\mathcal{R_e}\left\{\, U_{\alpha j}^*\, U_{\beta j}\, U_{\alpha k}\, U_{\beta k}^* \,\right\}\, \sin^2 \left( \frac{\Delta m_{jk}^2\, L}{4E} \right) \\
&{}+ 2\,\sum_{j>k} \,\operatorname\mathcal{I_m}\left\{\, U_{\alpha j}^*\, U_{\beta j}\, U_{\alpha k}\, U_{\beta k}^* \,\right\}\, \sin \left( \frac{\Delta m_{jk}^2\, L}{2E} \right) ~,
\end{align}$$

where $\Delta m_{jk}^2\ \equiv m_j^2 - m_k^2 ~.$

The phase that is responsible for oscillation is often written as (with c and $\hbar$ restored)

$$\frac{\Delta m_{jk}^2 c^4 \, L}{4 \hbar c\,E} =
\frac{{\rm GeV}\, {\rm fm}}{4 \hbar c} \times \frac{\Delta m_{jk}^2}{{\rm eV}^2} \frac{L}{\rm km} \frac{\rm GeV}{E} \approx 1.27 \times \frac{\Delta m_{jk}^2}{{\rm eV}^2} \frac{L}{\rm km} \frac{\rm GeV}{E} ~,$$

where 1.27 is unitless. In this form, it is convenient to plug in the oscillation parameters since:

- The mass differences, Δm^{2}, are known to be on the order of 10^{−4} (eV/c^{2})^{2} = (10^{−2} eV/c^{2})^{2}
- Oscillation distances, L, in modern experiments are on the order of kilometres
- Neutrino energies, E, in modern experiments are typically on order of MeV or GeV.

If there is no CP-violation (δ is zero), then the second sum is zero. Otherwise, the CP asymmetry can be given as

$$A^{(\alpha\beta)}_\mathsf{CP} =
P(\nu_\alpha \rightarrow \nu_\beta) - P(\bar{\nu}_\alpha \rightarrow \bar{\nu}_\beta) =
4\,\sum_{j>k}\,\operatorname\mathcal{I_m} \left\{\, U_{\alpha j}^*\, U_{\beta j}\, U_{\alpha k}\, U_{\beta k}^* \,\right\} \,\sin \left( \frac{\Delta m_{jk}^2\,L}{2E} \right)$$

In terms of Jarlskog invariant

$$\operatorname\mathcal{I_m} \left\{\, U_{\alpha j}^*\, U_{\beta j}\, U_{\alpha k}\, U_{\beta k}^* \,\right\} = J \, \sum_{\gamma,\ell} \varepsilon_{\alpha\beta\gamma}\,\varepsilon_{jk\ell} ~,$$

the CP asymmetry is expressed as

$$A^{(\alpha\beta)}_\mathsf{CP} = 16 \,
\sin \left( \frac{\Delta m_{21}^2\,L}{4E} \right)
\sin \left( \frac{\Delta m_{32}^2\,L}{4E} \right) \sin \left( \frac{\Delta m_{31}^2\,L}{4E} \right) \,J\, \sum_{\gamma} \,\varepsilon_{\alpha\beta\gamma}$$

=== Two-neutrino case ===
The above formula is correct for any number of neutrino generations. Writing it explicitly in terms of mixing angles is extremely cumbersome if there are more than two neutrinos that participate in mixing. Fortunately, there are several meaningful cases in which only two neutrinos participate significantly. In this case, it is sufficient to consider the mixing matrix

$$U = \begin{pmatrix} \cos\theta & \sin\theta \\ -\sin\theta & \cos\theta \end{pmatrix}.$$

Then the probability of a neutrino changing its flavor is

$$P_{\alpha\rightarrow\beta, \alpha\neq\beta} = \sin^2(2\theta) \, \sin^2 \left(\frac{\Delta m^2 L}{4E}\right) \quad \text{ [natural units] .}$$

Or, using SI units and the convention introduced above

$$P_{\alpha\rightarrow\beta, \alpha\neq\beta} = \sin^2(2\theta) \, \sin^2 \left( 1.27\, \frac{\Delta m^2 L}{E}\, \frac{\rm [eV^{2}]\,[km]}{\rm [GeV]}\right) ~.$$

This formula is often appropriate for discussing the transition ν_{μ} ↔ ν_{τ} in atmospheric mixing, since the electron neutrino plays almost no role in this case. It is also appropriate for the solar case of ν_{e} ↔ ν_{x}, where ν_{x} is a mix (superposition) of ν_{μ} and ν_{τ}. These approximations are possible because the mixing angle θ_{13} is very small and because two of the mass states are very close in mass compared to the third.

=== Classical analogue of neutrino oscillation ===
Spring-coupled pendulums

Time evolution of the pendulums

Lower frequency normal mode

Higher frequency normal mode

The basic physics behind neutrino oscillation can be found in any system of coupled harmonic oscillators. A simple example is a system of two pendulums connected by a weak spring (a spring with a small spring constant). The first pendulum is set in motion by the experimenter while the second begins at rest. Over time, the second pendulum begins to swing under the influence of the spring, while the first pendulum's amplitude decreases as it loses energy to the second. Eventually all of the system's energy is transferred to the second pendulum and the first is at rest. The process then reverses. The energy oscillates between the two pendulums repeatedly until it is lost to friction.

The behavior of this system can be understood by looking at its normal modes of oscillation. If the two pendulums are identical then one normal mode consists of both pendulums swinging in the same direction with a constant distance between them, while the other consists of the pendulums swinging in opposite (mirror image) directions. These normal modes have (slightly) different frequencies because the second involves the (weak) spring while the first does not. The initial state of the two-pendulum system is a combination of both normal modes. Over time, these normal modes drift out of phase, and this is seen as a transfer of motion from the first pendulum to the second.

The description of the system in terms of the two pendulums is analogous to the flavor basis of neutrinos. These are the parameters that are most easily produced and detected (in the case of neutrinos, by weak interactions involving the W boson). The description in terms of normal modes is analogous to the mass basis of neutrinos. These modes do not interact with each other when the system is free of outside influence.

When the pendulums are not identical the analysis is slightly more complicated. In the small-angle approximation, the potential energy of a single pendulum system is $\tfrac{1}{2}\tfrac{mg}{L} x^2$, where g is standard gravity, L is the length of the pendulum, m is the mass of the pendulum, and x is the horizontal displacement of the pendulum. As an isolated system the pendulum is a harmonic oscillator with a frequency of $\textstyle \sqrt{g/L\ }$. The potential energy of a spring is 1/2kx^{2}, where k is the spring constant and x is the displacement. With a mass attached it oscillates with a period of $\textstyle \sqrt{k/m\ }$. With two pendulums (labeled a and b) of equal mass but possibly unequal lengths and connected by a spring, the total potential energy is

$$V = \frac{m}{2} \left( \frac{g}{L_\text{a}} x_\text{a}^2 + \frac{g}{L_\text{b}} x_\text{b}^2 + \frac{k}{m} (x_\text{b} - x_\text{a})^2 \right).$$

This is a quadratic form in x_{a} and x_{b}, which can also be written as a matrix product:

$$V =
\frac{m}{2} \begin{pmatrix} x_\text{a} & x_\text{b} \end{pmatrix} \begin{pmatrix}
\frac{g}{L_\text{a}} + \frac{k}{m} &                 -\frac{k}{m} \\
-\frac{k}{m} &  \frac{g}{L_\text{b}} + \frac{k}{m}
\end{pmatrix} \begin{pmatrix} x_\text{a} \\ x_\text{b} \end{pmatrix}.$$

The 2 × 2 matrix is real symmetric and so (by the spectral theorem) it is orthogonally diagonalizable. That is, there is an angle θ such that if we define

$$\begin{pmatrix} x_\text{a} \\ x_\text{b} \end{pmatrix} =
\begin{pmatrix}
\cos\theta & \sin\theta \\
-\sin\theta & \cos\theta
\end{pmatrix} \begin{pmatrix} x_1 \\ x_2 \end{pmatrix}$$

then

$$V = \frac{m}{2} \begin{pmatrix} x_1 \ x_2 \end{pmatrix}
\begin{pmatrix}
\lambda_1 &         0 \\
0 & \lambda_2
\end{pmatrix} \begin{pmatrix} x_1 \\ x_2 \end{pmatrix}$$

where λ_{1} and λ_{2} are the eigenvalues of the matrix. The variables x_{1} and x_{2} describe normal modes which oscillate with frequencies of $\sqrt{\lambda_1\,}$ and $\sqrt{\lambda_2\,}$. When the two pendulums are identical (L_{a} = L_{b}), θ is 45°.

The angle θ is analogous to the Cabibbo angle (though that angle applies to quarks rather than neutrinos).

When the number of oscillators (particles) is increased to three, the orthogonal matrix can no longer be described by a single angle; instead, three are required (Euler angles). Furthermore, in the quantum case, the matrices may be complex. This requires the introduction of complex phases in addition to the rotation angles, which are associated with CP violation but do not influence the observable effects of neutrino oscillation.

== Theory, graphically ==
=== Two neutrino probabilities in vacuum ===
In the approximation where only two neutrinos participate in the oscillation, the probability of oscillation follows a simple pattern:

The blue curve shows the probability of the original neutrino retaining its identity. The red curve shows the probability of conversion to the other neutrino. The maximum probability of conversion is equal to sin^{2} 2θ. The frequency of the oscillation is controlled by Δm^{2}.

=== Three neutrino probabilities ===
If three neutrinos are considered, the probability for each neutrino to appear is somewhat complex. The graphs below show the probabilities for each flavor, with the plots in the left column showing a long range to display the slow "solar" oscillation, and the plots in the right column zoomed in, to display the fast "atmospheric" oscillation. The parameters used to create these graphs (see below) are consistent with current measurements, but since some parameters are still quite uncertain, some aspects of these plots are only qualitatively correct.

Electron neutrino oscillations, long range. Here and in the following diagrams black means electron neutrino, blue means muon neutrino and red means tau neutrino.	Electron neutrino oscillations, short range
Muon neutrino oscillations, long range	Muon neutrino oscillations, short range
Tau neutrino oscillations, long range	Tau neutrino oscillations, short range

The illustrations were created using the following parameter values:

- sin^{2}(2θ_{13}) = 0.10 (Determines the size of the small wiggles.)
- sin^{2}(2θ_{23}) = 0.97
- sin^{2}(2θ_{12}) = 0.861
- δ = 0 (If the actual value of this phase is large, the probabilities will be somewhat distorted, and will be different for neutrinos and antineutrinos.)
- Normal mass hierarchy: m_{1} ≤ m_{2} ≤ m_{3}
- Δm^{2}_{12} = 7.59×10^{−5} (eV/c^{2})^{2}
- Δm^{2}_{32} ≈ Δm^{2}_{13} = 2.32×10^{−3} (eV/c^{2})^{2}

== Observed values of oscillation parameters ==
- sin^{2}(2θ_{13}) = 0.086±0.002. PDG combination of Daya Bay, RENO, and Double Chooz results.
- sin^{2}(2θ_{12}) = 0.845±0.018. This corresponds to θ_{sol} (solar), obtained from KamLAND, solar, reactor and accelerator data.
- sin^{2}(θ_{23}) = 0.56+0.03
  −0.05. corresponding to the joint analysis of the T2K and NOvA Collaborations.
- Δm^{2}_{21} ≡ Δm^{2}_{sol} = 7.41+0.021
  −0.020×10^{−5} (eV/c^{2})^{2}
- |Δm^{2}_{31}| ≈ |Δm^{2}_{32}| ≡ Δm^{2}_{atm} = 2.437+0.028
  −0.027×10^{−3} (eV/c^{2})^{2} (in the normal mass hierarchy)
- δ, α_{1}, α_{2}, and the sign of Δm^{2}_{32} are currently unknown.

Solar neutrino experiments combined with KamLAND have measured the so-called solar parameters Δm^{2}_{sol} and sin^{2} θ_{sol}. Atmospheric neutrino experiments such as Super-Kamiokande together with the K2K and MINOS long baseline accelerator neutrino experiment have determined the so-called atmospheric parameters Δm^{2}_{atm} and sin^{2} θ_{atm}. The last mixing angle, θ_{13}, has been measured by the experiments Daya Bay, Double Chooz and RENO as sin^{2}(2θ_{13}).

For atmospheric neutrinos the relevant difference of masses is about Δm^{2} = 24×10^{−4} (eV/c^{2})^{2} and the typical energies are ~ 1 GeV; for these values the oscillations become visible for neutrinos traveling several hundred kilometres, which would be those neutrinos that reach the detector traveling through the earth, from below the horizon.

The mixing parameter θ_{13} is measured using electron anti-neutrinos from nuclear reactors. The rate of anti-neutrino interactions is measured in detectors sited near the reactors to determine the flux prior to any significant oscillations and then it is measured in far detectors (placed kilometres from the reactors). The oscillation is observed as an apparent disappearance of electron anti-neutrinos in the far detectors (i.e. the interaction rate at the far site is lower than predicted from the observed rate at the near site).

From atmospheric and solar neutrino oscillation experiments, it is known that two mixing angles of the MNS matrix are large and the third is smaller. This is in sharp contrast to the CKM matrix in which all three angles are small and hierarchically decreasing. The CP-violating phase of the MNS matrix is as of April 2020 to lie somewhere between −2° and −178°, from the T2K experiment.

If the neutrino mass proves to be of Majorana type (making the neutrino its own antiparticle), it is then possible that the MNS matrix has more than one phase.

Since experiments observing neutrino oscillation measure the squared mass difference and not absolute mass, one might claim that the lightest neutrino mass is exactly zero, without contradicting observations. This is however regarded as unlikely by theorists.

== Origins of neutrino mass ==
The question of how neutrino masses arise has not been answered conclusively. In the Standard Model of particle physics, fermions only have intrinsic mass because of interactions with the Higgs field (see Higgs boson). These interactions require both left- and right-handed versions of the fermion (see chirality). However, only left-handed neutrinos have been observed so far.

Neutrinos may have another source of mass through the Majorana mass term. This type of mass applies for electrically neutral particles since otherwise it would allow particles to turn into anti-particles, which would violate conservation of electric charge.

The smallest modification to the Standard Model, which only has left-handed neutrinos, is to allow these left-handed neutrinos to have Majorana masses. The problem with this is that the neutrino masses are surprisingly smaller than the rest of the known particles (at least 600000 times smaller than the mass of an electron), which, while it does not invalidate the theory, is widely regarded as unsatisfactory as this construction offers no insight into the origin of the neutrino mass scale.

The next simplest addition would be to add into the Standard Model right-handed neutrinos that interact with the left-handed neutrinos and the Higgs field in an analogous way to the rest of the fermions. These new neutrinos would interact with the other fermions solely in this way and hence would not be directly observable, so are not phenomenologically excluded. The problem of the disparity of the mass scales remains.

=== Seesaw mechanism ===
The most popular conjectured solution currently is the seesaw mechanism, where right-handed neutrinos with very large Majorana masses are added. If the right-handed neutrinos are very heavy, they induce a very small mass for the left-handed neutrinos, which is proportional to the reciprocal of the heavy mass.

If it is assumed that the neutrinos interact with the Higgs field with approximately the same strengths as the charged fermions do, the heavy mass should be close to the GUT scale. Because the Standard Model has only one fundamental mass scale, (Note: The Standard Model fundamental mass scale can be taken as the scale of SU(2)_{L} × U(1)_{Y} breaking.) all particle masses (Note: The mass of the electron and the mass of the Z boson are examples of particle masses set by the Standard Model fundamental mass scale.) must arise in relation to this scale.

There are other varieties of seesaw and there is currently great interest in the so-called low-scale seesaw schemes, such as the inverse seesaw mechanism.

The addition of right-handed neutrinos has the effect of adding new mass scales, unrelated to the mass scale of the Standard Model, hence the observation of heavy right-handed neutrinos would reveal physics beyond the Standard Model. Right-handed neutrinos would help to explain the origin of matter through a mechanism known as leptogenesis.

=== Other sources ===
There are alternative ways to modify the standard model that are similar to the addition of heavy right-handed neutrinos (e.g., the addition of new scalars or fermions in triplet states) and other modifications that are less similar (e.g., neutrino masses from loop effects and/or from suppressed couplings). One example of the last type of models is provided by certain versions supersymmetric extensions of the standard model of fundamental interactions, where R parity is not a symmetry. There, the exchange of supersymmetric particles such as squarks and sleptons can break the lepton number and lead to neutrino masses. These interactions are normally excluded from theories as they come from a class of interactions that lead to unacceptably rapid proton decay if they are all included. These models have little predictive power and are not able to provide a cold dark matter candidate.

== Oscillations in the early universe ==
During the early universe when particle concentrations and temperatures were high, neutrino oscillations could have behaved differently. Depending on neutrino mixing-angle parameters and masses, a broad spectrum of behavior may arise including vacuum-like neutrino oscillations, smooth evolution, or self-maintained coherence. The physics for this system is non-trivial and involves neutrino oscillations in a dense neutrino gas.

== See also ==
- MSW effect
- Majoron
- Neutral kaon mixing
- Lorentz-violating neutrino oscillations
- Neutral particle oscillation
- Neutrino astronomy
