= Solar neutrino problem =

Issue in astrophysics regarding discrepancy between the Sun's luminosity and neutrinos

The solar neutrino problem concerned a large discrepancy between the flux of solar neutrinos as predicted from the Sun's luminosity and as measured directly. The discrepancy was first observed in the mid-1960s and was resolved around 2002.

The flux of neutrinos at Earth is several tens of billions per square centimetre per second, mostly from the Sun's core. They are nevertheless difficult to detect, because they interact very weakly with matter, traversing the whole Earth. Of the three types (flavors) of neutrinos known in the Standard Model of particle physics, the Sun produces only electron neutrinos. When neutrino detectors became sensitive enough to measure the flow of electron neutrinos from the Sun, the number detected was much lower than predicted. In various experiments, the number deficit was between one half and two thirds.

Particle physicists knew that a mechanism, discussed in 1957 by Bruno Pontecorvo, could explain the deficit in electron neutrinos. However, they hesitated to accept it for various reasons, including the fact that it required a modification of the accepted Standard Model. They first pointed at the solar model for adjustment, which was ruled out. Today it is accepted that the neutrinos produced in the Sun are not massless particles as predicted by the Standard Model but rather a superposition of defined-mass eigenstates in different (complex) proportions. That allows a neutrino produced as a pure electron neutrino to change during propagation into a mixture of electron, muon and tau neutrinos, with a reduced probability of being detected by a detector sensitive to only electron neutrinos.

Several neutrino detectors aiming at different flavors, energies, and traveled distance contributed to the present knowledge of neutrinos. In 2002 and 2015, a total of four researchers related to some of these detectors were awarded the Nobel Prize in Physics.

== Background ==
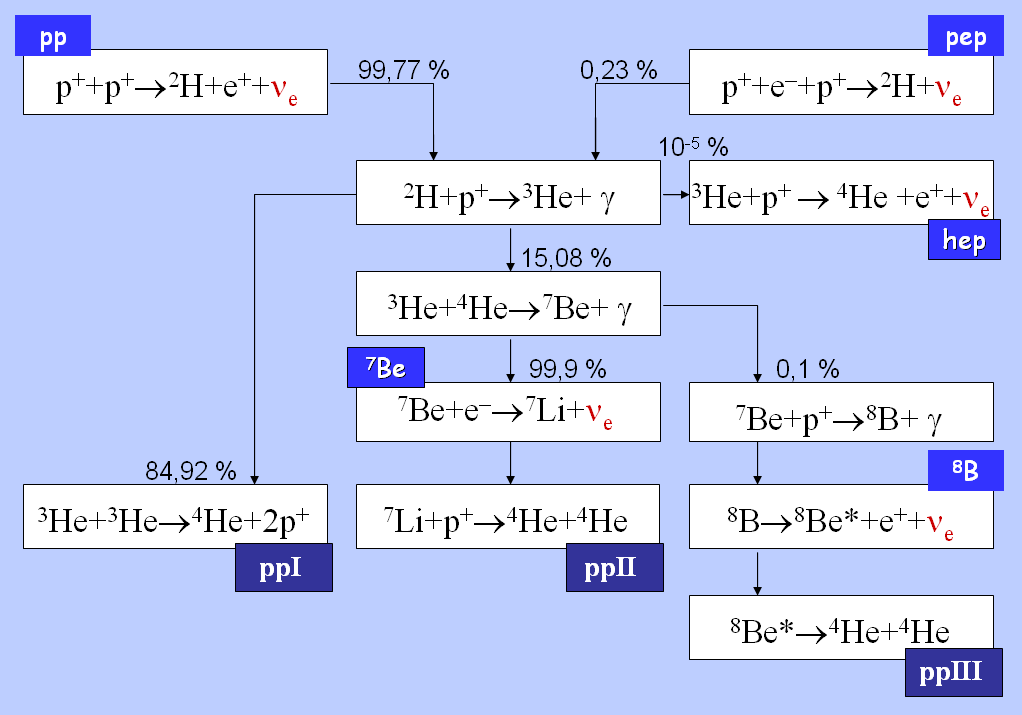
Reactions of proton-proton cycle

The Sun performs nuclear fusion via the proton–proton chain reaction, which converts four protons into alpha particles, neutrinos, positrons, and energy. This energy is released in the form of electromagnetic radiation, as gamma rays, as well as in the form of the kinetic energy of both the charged particles and the neutrinos. The neutrinos travel from the Sun's core to Earth without any appreciable absorption by the Sun's outer layers.

In the late 1960s, Ray Davis and John N. Bahcall's Homestake Experiment was the first to measure the flux of neutrinos from the Sun and detect a deficit. The experiment used a chlorine-based detector. Many subsequent radiochemical and water Cherenkov detectors confirmed the deficit, including the Kamioka Observatory and Sudbury Neutrino Observatory.

The expected number of solar neutrinos was computed using the standard solar model, which Bahcall had helped establish. The model gives a detailed account of the Sun's internal operation.

In 2002, Ray Davis and Masatoshi Koshiba won part of the Nobel Prize in Physics for experimental work which found the number of solar neutrinos to be around a third of the number predicted by the standard solar model.

In recognition of the firm evidence provided by the 1998 and 2001 experiments "for neutrino oscillation", Takaaki Kajita from the Super-Kamiokande Observatory and Arthur McDonald from the Sudbury Neutrino Observatory (SNO) were awarded the 2015 Nobel Prize for Physics. The Nobel Committee for Physics, however, erred in mentioning neutrino oscillations in regard to the SNO Experiment: for the high-energy solar neutrinos observed in that experiment, it is not neutrino oscillations, but rather the Mikheyev–Smirnov–Wolfenstein effect, that produced the observed results. Bruno Pontecorvo was not included in these Nobel prizes since he died in 1993.

== Proposed solutions ==
Early attempts to explain the discrepancy proposed that the models of the Sun were wrong, i.e., the temperature and pressure in the interior of the Sun were substantially different from what was believed. For example, since neutrinos measure the amount of current nuclear fusion, it was suggested that the nuclear processes in the core of the Sun might have temporarily shut down. Since it takes thousands of years for heat energy to move from the core to the surface of the Sun, this would not immediately be apparent.

Advances in helioseismology observations made it possible to infer the interior temperatures of the Sun; these results agreed with the well established standard solar model. Detailed observations of the neutrino spectrum from more advanced neutrino observatories produced results which no adjustment of the solar model could accommodate: while the overall lower neutrino flux (which the Homestake experiment results found) required a reduction in the solar core temperature, details in the energy spectrum of the neutrinos required a higher core temperature. This happens because different nuclear reactions, whose rates have different dependence upon the temperature, produce neutrinos with different energy. Any adjustment to the solar model worsened at least one aspect of the discrepancies.

== Resolution ==
The solar neutrino problem was resolved with an improved understanding of the properties of neutrinos. According to the Standard Model of particle physics, there are three flavors of neutrinos: electron neutrinos, muon neutrinos, and tau neutrinos. Electron neutrinos are the ones produced in the Sun and the ones detected by the above-mentioned experiments, in particular the chlorine-detector Homestake Mine experiment.

Through the 1970s, it was widely believed that neutrinos were massless and their flavors were invariant. However, in 1968 Pontecorvo proposed that if neutrinos had mass, then they could change from one flavor to another. Thus, the "missing" solar neutrinos could be electron neutrinos which changed into other flavors along the way to Earth, rendering them invisible to the detectors in the Homestake Mine and contemporary neutrino observatories.

The supernova 1987A indicated that neutrinos might have mass because of the difference in time of arrival of the neutrinos detected at Kamiokande and IMB. However, because very few neutrino events were detected, it was difficult to draw any conclusions with certainty. If Kamiokande and IMB had high-precision timers to measure the travel time of the neutrino burst through the Earth, they could have more definitively established whether or not neutrinos had mass. If neutrinos were massless, they would travel at the speed of light; if they had mass, they would travel at velocities slightly less than that of light. Since the detectors were not intended for supernova neutrino detection, they didn't have precise timing and this could not be done.

Strong evidence for neutrino oscillation came in 1998 from the Super-Kamiokande collaboration in Japan. It produced observations consistent with muon neutrinos (produced in the upper atmosphere by cosmic rays) changing into tau neutrinos within the Earth: Fewer atmospheric neutrinos were detected coming through the Earth than coming directly from above the detector. These observations concerned only muon neutrinos; no tau neutrinos were observed at Super-Kamiokande. The result made it more plausible that the deficit in the electron-flavor neutrinos observed in the (relatively low-energy) Homestake experiment also had to do with neutrino mass and flavor-changing.

One year later, the Sudbury Neutrino Observatory (SNO) started collecting data. That experiment aimed at the ^{8}B solar neutrinos, which at around 10 MeV are not much affected by oscillation in both the Sun and the Earth. A large deficit is nevertheless expected due to the Mikheyev–Smirnov–Wolfenstein effect as had been calculated by Alexei Smirnov in 1985. SNO's unique design employing a large quantity of heavy water as the detection medium was proposed by Herb Chen, also in 1985. SNO observed electron neutrinos specifically, and all flavors of neutrinos collectively, hence the fraction of electron neutrinos could be calculated. After extensive statistical analysis, the SNO collaboration determined that fraction to be about 34%, in perfect agreement with prediction. The total number of detected ^{8}B neutrinos also agrees with the then-rough predictions from the solar model.
