= Proton–proton chain =

Nuclear fusion reaction

Logarithm of the relative energy output (ε) of proton–proton (PP), CNO and Triple-α fusion processes at different temperatures (T). The dashed line shows the combined energy generation of the PP and CNO processes within a star. At the Sun's core temperature of 15.5 million K the PP process is dominant. The PP process and the CNO process are equal at around 20 million K.

Scheme of the proton–proton branch I reaction

The proton–proton chain, also commonly referred to as the p–p chain, is one of two known sets of nuclear fusion reactions by which stars convert hydrogen to helium. It dominates in stars with masses less than or equal to that of the Sun, whereas the CNO cycle, the other known reaction, is suggested by theoretical models to dominate in stars with masses greater than about 1.3 solar masses.

In general, proton–proton fusion can occur only if the kinetic energy (temperature) of the protons is high enough to overcome their mutual electrostatic repulsion.

In the Sun, deuteron-producing events are rare. Diprotons are the much more common result of proton–proton reactions within the star, and diprotons almost immediately decay back into two protons. Since the conversion of hydrogen to helium is slow, the complete conversion of the hydrogen initially in the core of the Sun is calculated to take more than ten billion years.

Although sometimes called the "proton–proton chain reaction", it is not a chain reaction in the normal sense. In most nuclear reactions, a chain reaction designates a reaction that produces a product, such as neutrons given off during fission, that quickly induces another such reaction. The proton–proton chain is, like a decay chain, a series of reactions. The product of one reaction is the starting material of the next reaction. There are two main chains leading from hydrogen to helium in the Sun. One chain has five reactions, the other chain has six.

== History of the theory ==
The theory that proton–proton reactions are the basic principle by which the Sun and other stars burn was advocated by Arthur Eddington in the 1920s. At the time, the temperature of the Sun was considered to be too low to overcome the Coulomb barrier. After the development of quantum mechanics, it was discovered that tunneling of the wavefunctions of the protons through the repulsive barrier allows for fusion at a lower temperature than the classical prediction.

In 1938, Hans Bethe and C.L. Critchfield proposed two protons combining to give a deuterium nucleus and a positron was the primary igniting reaction of pp chain nuclear reactions of the Sun, known today to be Branch II of the proton–proton chain. The reaction of two ^{3}He nuclei (Branch I) was not known at that time. This was part of the body of work in stellar nucleosynthesis for which Bethe won the Nobel Prize in Physics in 1967.

In 2014, the Borexino collaboration conducted the ﬁrst direct real time measurement of pp neutrinos, reporting a neutrino flux of (6.6 ± 0.7)×10^{10} cm^{-2}⋅s^{-1}. This measurement is consistent with predictions from the standard solar model, (5.98 ± 0.04)×10^{10} cm^{-2}⋅s^{-1}.

== The proton–proton chain ==
The first step in all the branches is the fusion of two protons into a deuteron. As the protons fuse, one of them undergoes beta plus decay, converting into a neutron by emitting a positron and an electron neutrino (though a small number of deuterium nuclei are produced by the "pep" reaction, see below):

p	+	p	→	^{2}_{1}D	+	e^{+}	+	ν_{e}	+	0.42 MeV

The positron will annihilate with an electron from the environment into two gamma rays. Including this annihilation and the energy of the neutrino, the net reaction

p	+	p	+ e^{−} → ^{2}_{1}D	+	ν_{e}	+	1.442 MeV

has a Q value (released energy) of 1.442 MeV: The relative amounts of energy going to the neutrino and to the other products is variable.

This is the rate-limiting reaction and is extremely slow due to it being initiated by the weak nuclear force. More than 99.99% of the time, the two colliding protons scatter instead of becoming deuterium. The average proton in the core of the Sun waits 9 billion years before it successfully fuses with another proton. It has not been possible to measure the cross-section of this reaction experimentally because it is so low but it can be calculated from theory.

After it is formed, the deuteron produced in the first stage can fuse with another proton to produce the stable, light isotope of helium, ^{3}He:

^{2}_{1}D	+	^{1}_{1}H	→	^{3}_{2}He	+	γ	+	5.493 MeV

This process, mediated by the strong nuclear force rather than the weak force, is extremely fast by comparison to the first step. It is estimated that, under the conditions in the Sun's core, each newly created deuterium nucleus exists for only about one second before it is converted into helium-3.

In the Sun, each helium-3 nucleus produced in these reactions exists for only about 400 years before it is converted into helium-4. Once the helium-3 has been produced, there are four possible paths to generate ^{4}He. In p–p I, helium-4 is produced by fusing two helium-3 nuclei into beryllium-6, which immediately emits two protons to become helium-4. The p–p II and p–p III branches fuse ^{3}He with pre-existing ^{4}He to form beryllium-7, which undergoes further reactions to produce two helium-4 nuclei.

About 99% of the energy output of the sun comes from the various p–p chains, with the other 1% coming from the CNO cycle. According to one model of the sun, 83.3% of the ^{4}He produced by the various p–p branches is produced via branch I while p–p II produces 16.68% and p–p III 0.02%. Since half the neutrinos produced in branches II and III are produced in the first step (synthesis of a deuteron), only about 8.35% of neutrinos come from the later steps (see below), and about 91.65% are from deuteron synthesis. However, another solar model from around the same time gives only 7.14% of neutrinos from the later steps and 92.86% from the synthesis of deuterium nuclei. The difference is apparently due to slightly different assumptions about the composition and metallicity of the sun.

There is also the extremely rare p–p IV branch. Other even rarer reactions may occur. The rate of these reactions is very low due to very small cross-sections, or because the number of reacting particles is so low that any reactions that might happen are statistically insignificant.

The overall reaction is:

4 ^{1}_{1}H^{+} + 2 e^{−} → ^{4}_{2}He^{2+} + 2 ν_{e}

releasing 26.73 MeV of energy, some of which is lost to the neutrinos.

=== The p–p I branch ===
^{3}_{2}He	+	^{3}_{2}He	→	^{4}_{2}He	+	2 ^{1}_{1}H	+	12.859 MeV

The fusion of two ^{3}_{2}He nuclei produces a ^{6}_{4}Be nucleus, which promptly ejects two protons. The complete chain releases a net energy of 26.732 MeV but 2.2% of this energy (0.59 MeV) is lost to the neutrinos that are produced. The p–p I branch is dominant at temperatures of 10 to 18 MK. Below 10 MK, the p–p chain proceeds at slow rate, resulting in a low production of ^{4}He.

=== The p–p II branch ===
Proton–proton II chain

^{3}_{2}He	+	^{4}_{2}He	→	^{7}_{4}Be	+	γ	+	1.59 MeV
^{7}_{4}Be	+	e^{−}	→	^{7}_{3}Li	+	ν_{e}	+	0.861 MeV	/	0.383 MeV
^{7}_{3}Li	+	^{1}_{1}H	→	2 ^{4}_{2}He			+	17.35 MeV

The p–p II branch is dominant at temperatures of 18 to 25 MK.

Note that the energies in the second reaction above are the energies of the neutrinos that are produced by the reaction. 90% of the neutrinos produced in the reaction of ^{7}Be to ^{7}Li carry an energy of 0.861 MeV, while the remaining 10% carry 0.383 MeV. The difference is whether the lithium-7 produced is in the ground state or an excited (metastable) state, respectively. The total energy released going from ^{7}Be to stable ^{7}Li is about 0.862 MeV, almost all of which is lost to the neutrino if the decay goes directly to the stable lithium. The final step, fusing ^{7}Li and ^{1}H, produces ^{8}Be, which immediately fissions into two ^{4}He nuclei.

=== The p–p III branch ===
Proton–proton III chain

^{3}_{2}He	+	^{4}_{2}He	→	^{7}_{4}Be	+	γ			+	1.59 MeV
^{7}_{4}Be	+	^{1}_{1}H	→	^{8}_{5}B	+	γ
^{8}_{5}B			→	^{8}_{4}Be	+	e^{+}	+	ν_{e}
^{8}_{4}Be			→	2 ^{4}_{2}He

The last three stages of this chain, plus the positron annihilation, contribute a total of 18.209 MeV, though much of this is lost to the neutrino.

The p–p III chain is dominant if the temperature exceeds 25 MK.

The p–p III chain is not a major source of energy in the Sun, but it was very important in the solar neutrino problem because it generates very high energy neutrinos (up to 14.06 MeV).

=== The p–p IV (Hep) branch ===
This reaction is predicted theoretically, but it has never been observed due to its rarity (about 0.3 ppm in the Sun). In this reaction, helium-3 captures a proton directly to give helium-4, with an even higher possible neutrino energy (up to 18.8 MeV).

^{3}_{2}He	+	^{1}_{1}H	→	^{4}_{2}He	+	e^{+}	+	ν_{e}

The mass–energy relationship gives 19.795 MeV for the energy released by this reaction plus the ensuing annihilation, some of which is lost to the neutrino.

=== Energy release ===
Comparing the mass of the final helium-4 nucleus with the masses of the four protons reveals that 0.7% of the mass of the original protons has been lost. This mass has been converted into energy, in the form of kinetic energy of produced particles, gamma rays, and neutrinos released during each of the individual reactions. The total energy yield of one whole chain is 26.73 MeV.

Energy released as gamma rays will interact with electrons and protons and heat the interior of the Sun. Also kinetic energy of fusion products (e.g. of the two protons and the ^{4}_{2}He from the p–p I reaction) adds energy to the plasma in the Sun. This heating keeps the core of the Sun hot and prevents it from collapsing under its own weight as it would if the sun were to cool down.

Neutrinos do not interact significantly with matter and therefore do not heat the Sun's interior (which would help support it against gravitational collapse). Their energy is lost: the neutrinos in the p–p I, p–p II, and p–p III chains carry away 2.0%, 4.0%, and 28.3% of the energy in those reactions, respectively.

The following table calculates the amount of energy lost to neutrinos and the amount of "solar luminosity" coming from the three branches. "Luminosity" here means the amount of energy given off by the Sun as electromagnetic radiation rather than as neutrinos. The starting figures used are the ones mentioned higher in this article. The table concerns only the 99% of the power and neutrinos that come from the p–p reactions, not the 1% coming from the CNO cycle.

Luminosity production in the sun
Branch	Percent of^{4}He produced	Percent loss due to neutrino production	Relative amount of energy lost	Relative amount of luminosity produced	Percentage of total luminosity
Branch I	83.3%	2.2%	1.67%	81.6%	83.6%
Branch II	16.68%	4%	0.67%	16.0%	16.4%
Branch III	0.02%	28.3%	0.0057%	0.014%	0.015%
total	100%		2.34%	97.7%	100%

== The PEP reaction ==
Proton–proton and electron-capture reactions in a star

A deuteron can also be produced by the rare pep (proton–electron–proton) reaction (electron capture):

^{1}_{1}H	+	e^{−}	+	^{1}_{1}H	→	^{2}_{1}D^{+}	+	ν_{e}

In the Sun, the frequency ratio of the pep reaction versus the p–p reaction is 1:400. However, the neutrinos released by the pep reaction are far more energetic: while neutrinos produced in the first step of the p–p reaction range in energy up to 0.42 MeV, the pep reaction produces sharp-energy-line neutrinos of 1.44 MeV. Detection of solar neutrinos from this reaction were reported by the Borexino collaboration in 2012.

Both the pep and p–p reactions can be seen as two different Feynman representations of the same basic interaction, where the electron passes to the right side of the reaction as a positron. This is represented in the figure of proton–proton and electron-capture reactions in a star, available at the NDM'06 web site.

== See also ==
- CNO cycle
- Triple-alpha process

== Sources ==
H. A. Bethe; C. L. Critchfield (1938). "The formation of deuterons by proton combination". Physical Review. 54 (4): 248–254. Bibcode:1938PhRv...54..248B. doi:10.1103/PhysRev.54.248.
