= Supernova neutrinos =

Astronomical neutrinos produced during core-collapse supernova explosion

Supernova neutrinos are weakly interactive elementary particles produced during a core-collapse supernova explosion. A massive star collapses at the end of its life, emitting on the order of 10^{58} neutrinos and antineutrinos in all lepton flavors. The luminosity of different neutrino and antineutrino species are roughly the same. They carry away about 99% of the gravitational energy of the dying star as a burst lasting tens of seconds. The typical supernova neutrino energies are 10 to 20 MeV. Supernovae (Note: Supernovae is the plural of supernova, used in most academic sources. Less formally, the term supernovas may also be used.) are considered the strongest and most frequent source of cosmic neutrinos in the MeV energy range.

Since neutrinos are generated in the core of a supernova, they play a crucial role in the star's collapse and explosion. Neutrino heating is believed to be a critical factor in supernova explosions. Therefore, observation of neutrinos from supernovae provides detailed information about core collapse and the explosion mechanism. Further, neutrinos undergoing collective flavor conversions in a supernova's dense interior offers opportunities to study neutrino-neutrino interactions. The only supernova neutrino event detected so far is SN 1987A. (Note: As of November 2020) Nevertheless, with current detector sensitivities, it is expected that thousands of neutrino events from a galactic core-collapse supernova would be observed. The next generation of experiments are designed to be sensitive to neutrinos from supernova explosions as far as Andromeda or beyond. The observation of supernovae will broaden our understanding of various astrophysical and particle physics phenomena. Further, coincident detection of supernova neutrino in different experiments would provide an early alarm to astronomers about a supernova.

== History ==
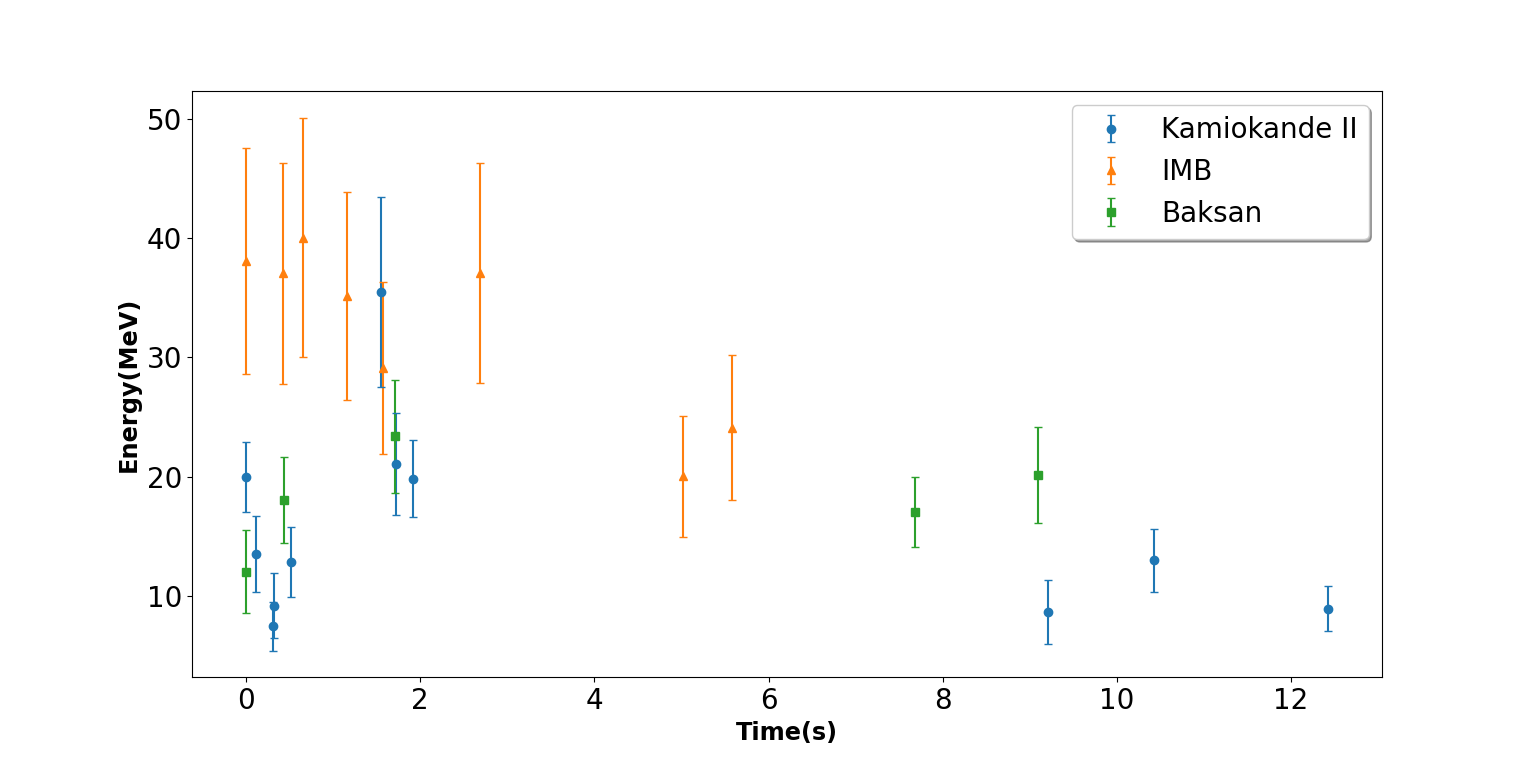
Measured neutrino events from SN 1987A

Stirling A. Colgate and Richard H. White, and independently W. David Arnett, identified the role of neutrinos in core collapse, which resulted in the subsequent development of the theory of supernova explosion mechanism. In February 1987, the observation of supernova neutrinos experimentally verified the theoretical relationship between neutrinos and supernovae. The Nobel Prize-winning event, known as SN 1987A, was the collapse of a blue supergiant star Sanduleak -69° 202, in the Large Magellanic Cloud outside our Galaxy, 51 kpc away. About 10^{58} lightweight weakly-interacting neutrinos were produced, carrying away almost all of the energy of the supernova. Two kiloton-scale water Cherenkov detectors, Kamiokande II and IMB, along with a smaller Baksan Observatory, detected a total of 25 neutrino-events over a period of about 13 seconds. Only electron-type neutrinos were detected because neutrino energies were below the threshold of muon or tau production. The SN 1987A neutrino data, although sparse, confirmed the salient features of the basic supernova model of gravitational collapse and associated neutrino emission. It put strong constraints on neutrino properties such as charge and decay rate. The observation is considered a breakthrough in the field of supernova and neutrino physics.

== Properties ==
Neutrinos are fermions, i.e. elementary particles with a spin of 1/2. They interact only through weak interaction and gravity. A core-collapse supernova emits a burst of ~$10^{52}$ neutrinos and antineutrinos on a time scale of tens of seconds. (Note: Supernova neutrinos refer to both neutrinos and antineutrinos emitted from the supernova.) Supernova neutrinos carry away about 99% of the gravitational energy of the dying star in the form of kinetic energy. (Note: This number is obtained through the computer simulations of Type II supernovae, utilizing the energy conservation and the interaction theory among the constituents.) Energy is divided roughly equally between the three flavors of neutrinos and three flavors of antineutrinos. Their average energy is of the order 10 MeV. The neutrino luminosity of a supernova is typically on the order of $10^{45} \text{J}$ $\text{s}^{-1}$ or $10^{45} \text{W}$. The core-collapse events are the strongest and most frequent source of cosmic neutrinos in the MeV energy range.

During a supernova, neutrinos are produced in enormous numbers inside the core. Therefore, they have a fundamental influence on the collapse and supernova explosions. Neutrino heating is predicted to be responsible for the supernova explosion. Neutrino oscillations during the collapse and explosion generate the gravitational wave bursts. Furthermore, neutrino interactions set the neutron-to-proton ratio, determining the nucleosynthesis outcome of heavier elements in the neutrino driven wind.

== Production ==
Supernova neutrinos are produced when a massive star collapses at the end of its life, ejecting its outer mantle in an explosion. Wilson's delayed neutrino explosion mechanism has been used for 30 years to explain core collapse supernova.

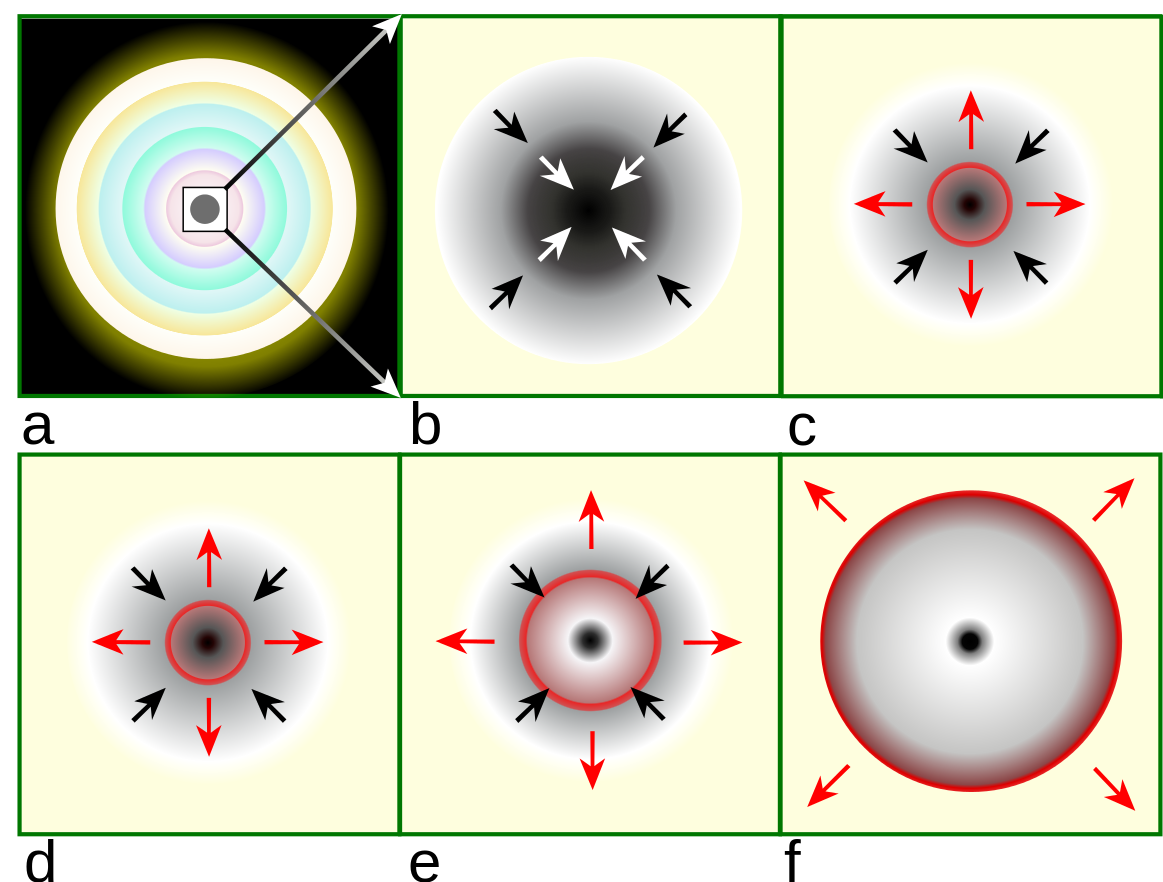
Evolutionary stages of the core-collapse supernova: (a) Neutronization phase (b) In-fall of material and neutrino trapping (c) Generation of shock wave and neutrinos burst (d) Stalling of shock wave (e) Neutrino heating (f) Explosion

Near the end of life, a massive star is made up of onion-layered shells of elements with an iron core. During the early stage of the collapse, electron neutrinos are created through electron-capture on protons bound inside iron-nuclei:

$\mathrm{e}^- + \mathrm{p} \rightarrow \nu_e + \mathrm{n}$

The above reaction produces neutron-rich nuclei, leading to neutronization of the core. Therefore, this is known as the neutronization phase. Some of these nuclei undergo beta-decay and produce anti-electron neutrinos:

$\mathrm{n} \rightarrow \mathrm{p} + \mathrm{e}^- + \bar\nu_e$

The above processes reduce the core energy and its lepton density. Hence, the electron degeneracy pressure is unable to stabilize the stellar core against the gravitational force, and the star collapses. When the density of the central region of collapse exceeds 10^{12} g/cm^{3}, the diffusion time of neutrinos exceeds the collapse time. Therefore, the neutrinos become trapped inside the core. When the central region of the core reaches nuclear densities (~ 10^{14} g/cm^{3}), the nuclear pressure causes the collapse to deaccelerate. This generates a shock wave in the outer core (region of iron core), which triggers the supernova explosion. The trapped electron neutrinos are released in the form of neutrino burst in the first tens of milliseconds. It is found from simulations that the neutrino burst and iron photo-disintegration weaken the shock wave within milliseconds of propagation through the iron core. The weakening of the shock wave results in mass infall, which forms a neutron star. (Note: A black hole is formed instead of a neutron star if the progenitor star has a mass above 25 solar masses) This is known as the accretion phase and lasts between few tens to few hundreds of milliseconds. The high-density region traps neutrinos. When the temperature reaches 10 MeV, thermal photons generate electron–positron pairs. Neutrinos and antineutrinos are created through weak-interaction of electron–positron pairs:

$\mathrm{e}^- + \mathrm{e}^+ \rightarrow \bar\nu_\alpha + \nu_\alpha$

The luminosity of electron flavor is significantly higher than for non-electrons. As the neutrino temperature rises in the compressionally heated core, neutrinos energize the shock wave through charged current reactions with free nucleons:

$\nu_e + \mathrm{n} \rightarrow \mathrm{p} + \mathrm{e}^-$

$\bar\nu_\mathrm{e} + \mathrm{p} \rightarrow \mathrm{e}^+ + \mathrm{n}$

When the thermal pressure created by neutrino heating increases above the pressure of the infalling material, the stalled shock wave is rejuvenated, and neutrinos are released. The neutron star cools down as the neutrino-pair production and neutrino release continues. Therefore, it is known as the cooling phase. The Luminosities of different neutrino and antineutrino species are roughly the same. The supernova neutrino luminosity drops significantly after several tens of seconds.

== Oscillation ==
The knowledge of flux and flavor content of the neutrinos behind the shock wave is essential to implement the neutrino-driven heating mechanism in computer simulations of supernova explosions. Neutrino oscillations in dense matter is an active field of research.

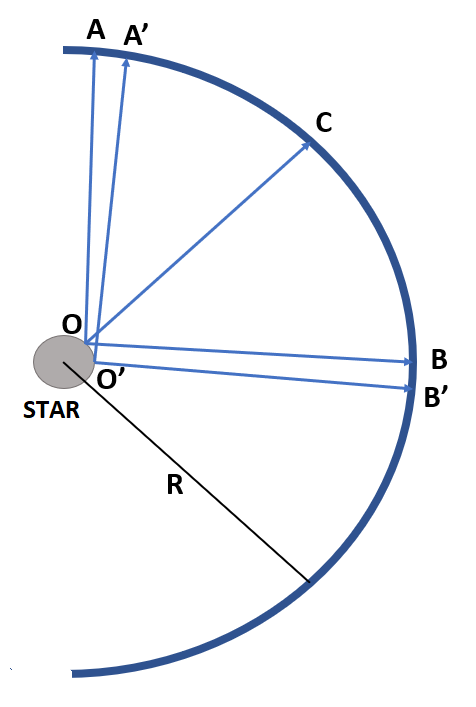
Schematic of neutrino bulb model

Neutrinos undergo flavor conversions after they thermally decouple from the proto-neutron star. Within the neutrino-bulb model, neutrinos of all flavors decouple at a single sharp surface near the surface of the star. Also, the neutrinos travelling in different directions are assumed to travel the same path length in reaching a certain distance R from the center. This assumption is known as single angle approximation, which along with spherical symmetricity of the supernova, allows us to treat neutrinos emitted in the same flavor as an ensemble and describe their evolution only as a function of distance.

The flavor evolution of neutrinos for each energy mode is described by the density matrix:

$\hat{\rho}_t(E,R) = \sum_{\alpha=e, \mu, \tau} \frac{L_{\nu_\alpha}e^{\frac{-t}{\tau}}}{\langle E_{\nu_\alpha}\rangle}f_{\nu_\alpha}(E) |\nu_\alpha \rangle \langle \nu_\alpha|$

Here, $L_{\nu_\alpha}$ is the initial neutrino luminosity at the surface of a proto-neutron star which drops exponentially. Assuming decay time by $\tau$, the total energy emitted per unit time for a particular flavor can be given by $L_{\nu_\alpha}e^{\frac{-t}{\tau}}$. $\langle E_{\nu_\alpha}\rangle$ represents average energy. Therefore, the fraction gives the number of neutrinos emitted per unit of time in that flavor. $f_{\nu_\alpha}(E)$ is normalized energy distribution for the corresponding flavor.

The same formula holds for antineutrinos too.

Neutrino luminosity is found by the following relation:

$E_B = 6 \times \int_0^\infin L_{\nu_\alpha} e^{-t/\tau}dt$

The integral is multiplied by 6 because the released binding energy is divided equally between the three flavors of neutrinos and three flavors of antineutrinos.

The evolution of the density operator is given by Liouville's equation:

$\frac{d}{dr}\hat{\rho}_t(E,r) = -i[\hat{H}_t(E,r),\hat{\rho}_t(E,r)]$

The Hamiltonian $\hat{H}_t(E,r)$ covers vacuum oscillations, charged current interaction of neutrinos from electrons and protons, as well as neutrino–neutrino interactions. Neutrino self-interactions are non-linear effects that result in collective flavor conversions. They are significant only when interaction frequency exceeds vacuum oscillation frequency. Typically, they become negligible after a few hundred kilometers from the center. Thereafter, Mikheyev–Smirnov–Wolfenstein resonances with the matter in the stellar envelope can describe the neutrino evolution.

== Detection ==
There are several different ways to observe supernova neutrinos. Almost all of them involves the inverse beta decay reaction for the detection of neutrinos. The reaction is a charged current weak interaction, where an electron antineutrino interacts with a proton produces a positron and a neutron:

$\bar\nu_\mathrm{e} + \mathrm{p} \rightarrow \mathrm{e}^+ + \mathrm{n}$

The positron retains most of the energy of the incoming neutrino. It produces a cone of Cherenkov light, which is detected by photomultiplier tubes (PMT's) arrayed on the walls of the detector. Neutrino oscillations in the Earth matter may affect the supernova neutrino signals detected in experimental facilities.

Current detectors capable of observing the supernova neutrinos
Water Cherenkov detector	Super-Kamiokande, Hyper-Kamiokande, IceCube, KM3NeT, Baikal
Scintillator detector	Baksan, LVD, Borexino, KamLAND, JUNO, SNO+, NOνA
Lead-based detector	HALO
Liquid noble dark matter detector	ArDM, Xenon
Liquid argon time projection chamber detector	DUNE
Other detector	nEXO

With current detector sensitivities, it is expected that thousands of neutrino events from a galactic core-collapse supernova would be observed. Large-scale detectors such as Hyper-Kamiokande or IceCube can detect up to $10^{5}$ events. Unfortunately, SN 1987A is the only supernova neutrino event detected so far. There have not been any galactic supernova in the Milky Way in the last 120 years, despite the expected rate of 0.8-3 per century. Nevertheless, a supernova at 10 kPc distance will enable a detailed study of the neutrino signal, providing unique physics insights. Additionally, the next generation of underground experiments, like Hyper-Kamiokande, are designed to be sensitive to neutrinos from supernova explosions as far as Andromeda or beyond. Further they are speculated to have good supernova pointing capability too.

== Significance ==
Since supernova neutrinos originate deep inside the stellar core, they are a relatively reliable messenger of the supernova mechanism. Due to their weakly interacting nature, the neutrino signals from a galactic supernova can give information about the physical conditions at the center of core collapse, which would be otherwise inaccessible. Furthermore, they are the only source of information for core-collapse events which don't result in a supernova or when the supernova is in a dust-obscured region. Future observations of supernova neutrinos will constrain the different theoretical models of core collapse and explosion mechanism, by testing them against the direct empirical information from the supernova core.

Due to their weakly interacting nature, near light speed neutrinos emerge promptly after the collapse. In contrast, there may be a delay of hours or days before the photon signal emerges from the stellar envelope. Therefore, a supernova will be observed in neutrino observatories before the optical signal, even after travelling millions of light years. The coincident detection of neutrino signals from different experiments would provide an early alarm to astronomers to direct telescopes to the right part of the sky to capture the supernova's light. The Supernova Early Warning System is a project which aims to connect neutrino detectors around the world, and trigger the electromagnetic counterpart experiments in case of a sudden influx of neutrinos in the detectors.

The flavor evolution of neutrinos, propagating through the dense and turbulent interior of the supernova, is dominated by the collective behavior associated with neutrino-neutrino interactions. Therefore, supernova neutrinos offer an opportunity to examine neutrino flavor mixing under high-density conditions. Being sensitive to neutrino mass ordering and mass hierarchy, they can provide information about neutrino properties. Further, they can act as a standard candle to measure cosmic distance as the neutronization burst signal does not depend on its progenitor.

== Diffused supernova neutrino background ==
The Diffuse Supernova Neutrino Background (DSNB) is a cosmic background of (anti)neutrinos formed by the accumulation of neutrinos emitted from all past core-collapse supernovae. Their existence was predicted even before the observation of supernova neutrinos. DSNB can be used to study physics on the cosmological scale. They provide an independent test of the supernova rate. They can also give information about neutrino emission properties, stellar dynamics and failed progenitors. Super-Kamiokande has put the observational upper limit on the DSNB flux as $5.5 \;\mathrm{cm}^{-2} \mathrm{s}^{-1}$ above 19.3 MeV of neutrino energy. The theoretically estimated flux is only half this value. Therefore, the DSNB signal is expected to be detected in the near future with detectors like JUNO and SuperK-Gd.
