= SNO+ =

Underground neutrino physics experiment

Coordinates: 46.475°N 81.201°W

The SNO+ Experiment
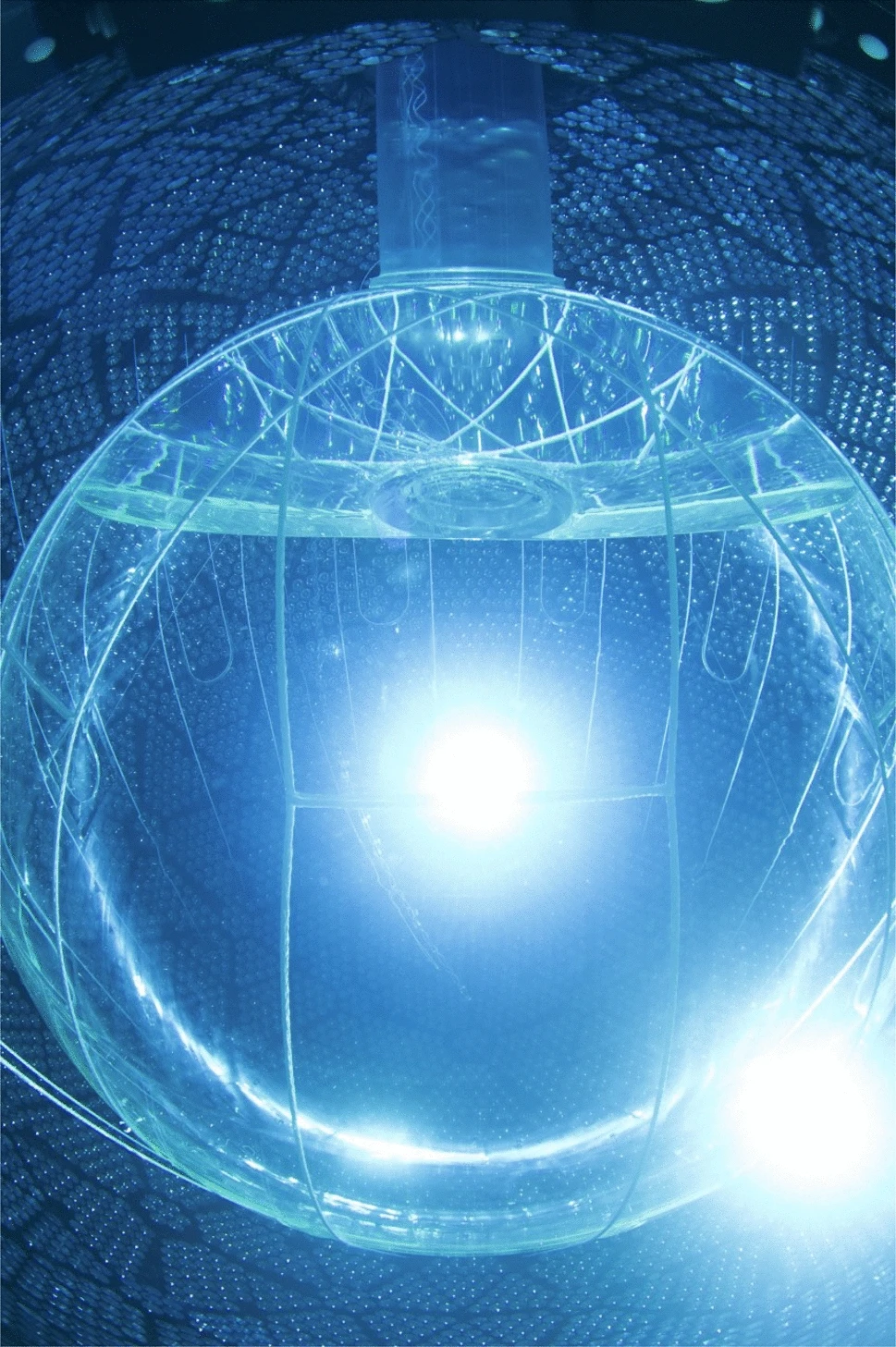
- Photograph of the SNO+ Detector, taken when the water within the Acrylic Vessel was being replaced with liquid scintillator.

Detector Characteristics
- Location: SNOLAB
- Start of data-taking: 2017
- Status: Taking data in scintillator phase
- Detector media: Water Cherenkov, Organic liquid scintillator (LAB, PPO, bis-MSB)
- Neutrino interaction modes: Neutrino-electron elastic scattering, inverse beta decay, neutrinoless double beta decay (planned)
- Active mass: 780 tonnes (liquid scintillator)

SNO+ (Sudbury Neutrino Observatory Plus) is a multipurpose neutrino detector located approximately 2 km underground in Creighton Mine at SNOLAB, near Sudbury, Ontario, Canada. It reuses the acrylic vessel and array of photomultiplier tubes from the predecessor Sudbury Neutrino Observatory (SNO), replacing heavy water with 780 tonnes of organic liquid scintillator to enable high-sensitivity measurements of low-energy neutrino interactions. The experiment's primary physics goals include the search for neutrinoless double beta decay of the isotope ^{130}Te, precision studies of solar, reactor, and geo-neutrinos, and supernova neutrino detection. SNO+ completed its liquid scintillator fill and wavelength shifter (PPO) loading in 2022 and has been operating in a physics data-taking phase since that time.

== Physics goals ==
The primary goal of the SNO+ detector is the search for neutrinoless double beta decay (0νββ), specifically with regard to decay of ^{130}Te, to understand if a neutrino is its own anti-particle (i.e., a majorana fermion). Secondary physics goals include measurement of neutrinos or antineutrinos from:

- Proton-electron-proton (pep) and carbon-nitrogen-oxygen (CNO) cycles within the Sun to better understand neutrino-matter interaction and solar composition.
- Beta decay of uranium and thorium within the Earth (geoneutrinos) to constrain Earth's radioactive heat budget.
- Beta decay of fission daughter products in nuclear reactors (reactor antineutrinos) to better constrain neutrino oscillation parameters.
- Supernova neutrinos and antineutrinos for early warning detection of supernova (see Supernova Early Warning System).
- Nucleon decay into neutrinos, which would indicate a violation of baryon conservation.

== Construction and Commissioning ==
The previous experiment, SNO, used heavy water (D_{2}O) within the sphere and relied on Cherenkov radiation interaction. SNO+ reuses much of the infrastructure from SNO, including the 12 m acrylic vessel and thousands of photomultiplier tubes, while adding systems capable of handling a liquid scintillator target.

A neutrino interaction with this liquid produces several times more light than an interaction in a water Cherenkov experiment such as the original SNO experiment or Super-Kamiokande. The energy threshold for the detection of neutrinos can, therefore, be lower, and proton–electron–proton solar neutrinos (with an energy of 1.44 MeV) can be observed. In addition, a liquid scintillator experiment can detect anti-neutrinos like those created in nuclear fission reactors and the decay of thorium and uranium in the earth.

Earlier proposals placed more emphasis on neutrino observations. The current emphasis on neutrinoless double beta decay is because the interior of the acrylic vessel has been significantly contaminated by radioactive daughter products of the radon gas that is common in the mine air. These could leach into the scintillator, where some would be removed by the filtration system, but the remainder may interfere with low-energy neutrino measurements. The neutrinoless double beta decay observations are not affected by this.

The project received funding for initial construction from NSERC in April 2007. By early 2013, the cavity had been refurbished and re-sealed to new cleanliness standards, more stringent than for the original SNO due to the new experiment's greater sensitivity.

A significant civil engineering challenge was that the original SNO vessel was supported by a series of ropes, to prevent the weight of the heavy water inside from sinking it in the surrounding normal water. The new liquid scintillator (linear alkylbenzene) is lighter than water, and must be held down instead, but still without blocking the view of its interior. The original support rope attachment points, cast into the acrylic sphere's equator, were not suitable for upside-down use.

The detector underwent a water-filled commissioning phase from 2017 to 2019, which allowed initial physics measurements such as the first observation of reactor antineutrino interactions in water. During this phase, SNO+ also measured the ^{8}B solar neutrino flux and constrained backgrounds for the upcoming scintillator phase.

In 2022, the detector was filled with Linear alkylbenzene (LAB) liquid scintillator loaded with the wavelength shifter PPO, significantly increasing light yield and enabling a broader physics programme.

== Calibration and Detector Performance ==
Calibration is central to SNO+'s precise event reconstruction. During the water phase, deployed light sources such as laserball systems were used to measure optical properties, light propagation, and detector response.

In the scintillator phase, calibration continues with internal sources and in situ monitoring systems to map optical response, energy scale, and PMT performance while preserving radiopurity.

== Computing ==
SNO+ uses a combination of local computing resources at SNOLAB and high-performance computing centers across Canada and partner institutions to process and analyze physics data. Raw data from the detector, including both physics and calibration runs, are transferred to offline computing facilities for event reconstruction, calibration, simulation, and analysis.

The detector produces several terabytes of raw data per year. Data are reconstructed using custom software frameworks that incorporate optical calibration constants, photomultiplier tube response, and scintillator properties. Event reconstruction algorithms correct for detector non-uniformities and enable accurate energy and position measurements for neutrino interactions and background events.

Calibration and simulation are tightly integrated into the computing workflow. Optical calibration data from deployed light sources, laserball systems, and internal radioactive sources are used to refine the detector model, correct for photomultiplier efficiencies, and validate energy and timing reconstruction. Monte Carlo simulations of neutrino interactions and radioactive backgrounds are compared with calibration and physics data to optimize event selection and estimate systematic uncertainties.

SNO+ computing infrastructure also supports real-time monitoring and quality assurance. Distributed workflow management tools allow collaboration members to access, process, and analyze data remotely, enabling efficient collaboration and rapid feedback on detector performance. Long-term storage is maintained via a combination of disk arrays and tape archives at SNOLAB and affiliated institutions, ensuring the preservation of raw and reconstructed data for ongoing and future analyses.

== Scientific Programme and Operations ==
=== Water Phase Results ===
During 2017–2019, SNO+ achieved:

- Detection of reactor antineutrinos at significant distances using pure water.
- Measurement of the ^{8}B solar neutrino flux and constraints on neutrino oscillation parameters.

=== Scintillator-Phase Physics ===
With LAB scintillator, SNO+ collects data on:

- Reactor antineutrino oscillations using spectral measurements.
- Solar neutrinos with improved sensitivity.
- Background characterization and radiopurity studies in preparation for isotope loading.

=== Neutrinoless Double Beta Decay (0νββ) and Tellurium Loading ===
The next major phase involves loading natural tellurium (^{130}Te) into the scintillator:

- Initial 0.5 % tellurium loading (~3900 kg) targets a half-life sensitivity of ~2×10^{26} years (90% CL) over several years of exposure.
- Future plans include higher loading concentrations to explore the inverted hierarchy region for 0νββ.

SNO+ will also continue to study geo-neutrinos, low-energy solar neutrinos, and remain sensitive to supernova neutrino events due to its deep underground location and low-background environment.
