= Water equivalent =

The water equivalent is calculated for the following:

- Meter water equivalent, a standard measure of cosmic ray attenuation in underground laboratories
- Snow water equivalent
