= POLARIS (seismology) =

Seismology experiment at SNOLAB

POLARIS (PUPS) was an underground experiment to observe seismic signals at depth in very hard rock. It was carried out at SNOLAB, and underground physics laboratory in Sudbury, Ontario. In addition to academic research, the observational data collected by the POLARIS system was used by the Canadian National Data Centre (CNDC) for earthquake, and nuclear explosion (as part of the Partial Nuclear Test Ban Treaty) monitoring. The name POLARIS is an acronym for Portable Observatories for Lithospheric Analysis and Research Investigating Seismicity.

== Background ==
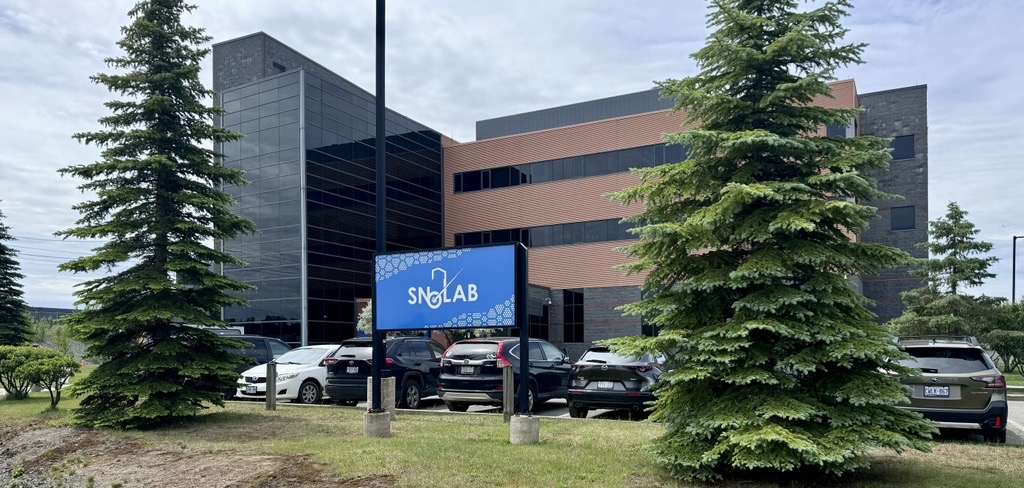
SNOLAB surface building in 2024.

SNOLAB is an underground physics lab situated deep in the Creighton Mine, a 2 km deep Nickel mine operated by the Vale Limited. The mine is situated in the Sudbury Basin: a large impact crater on the Canadian Shield.

SNOLAB is the world's deepest operational clean room facility. Although accessed through an active mine, the laboratory proper is maintained as a class-2000 cleanroom, with very low levels of dust and background radiation. SNOLAB's 2070 m (6800 feet) of overburden rock provides 6010 metre water equivalent (MWE) shielding from cosmic rays, providing a low-background environment for experiments requiring high sensitivities and extremely low counting rates.

== Description ==
POLARIS consisted of multiple three-point broadband seismographis stations located above Creighton Mine, as well as within the mine itself. Two stations were located at the surface, while others were positioned at depths of 1-2km. It was because of the depth of placement, that extremely clear seismographic data was able to be collected of the 4.1 magnitude earthquake that occurred on 26 November 2006 in the Sudbury area; the 2km POLARIS station was placed only 300m above the earthquake's focus.
