= Main Magnetic Focus Ion Source =

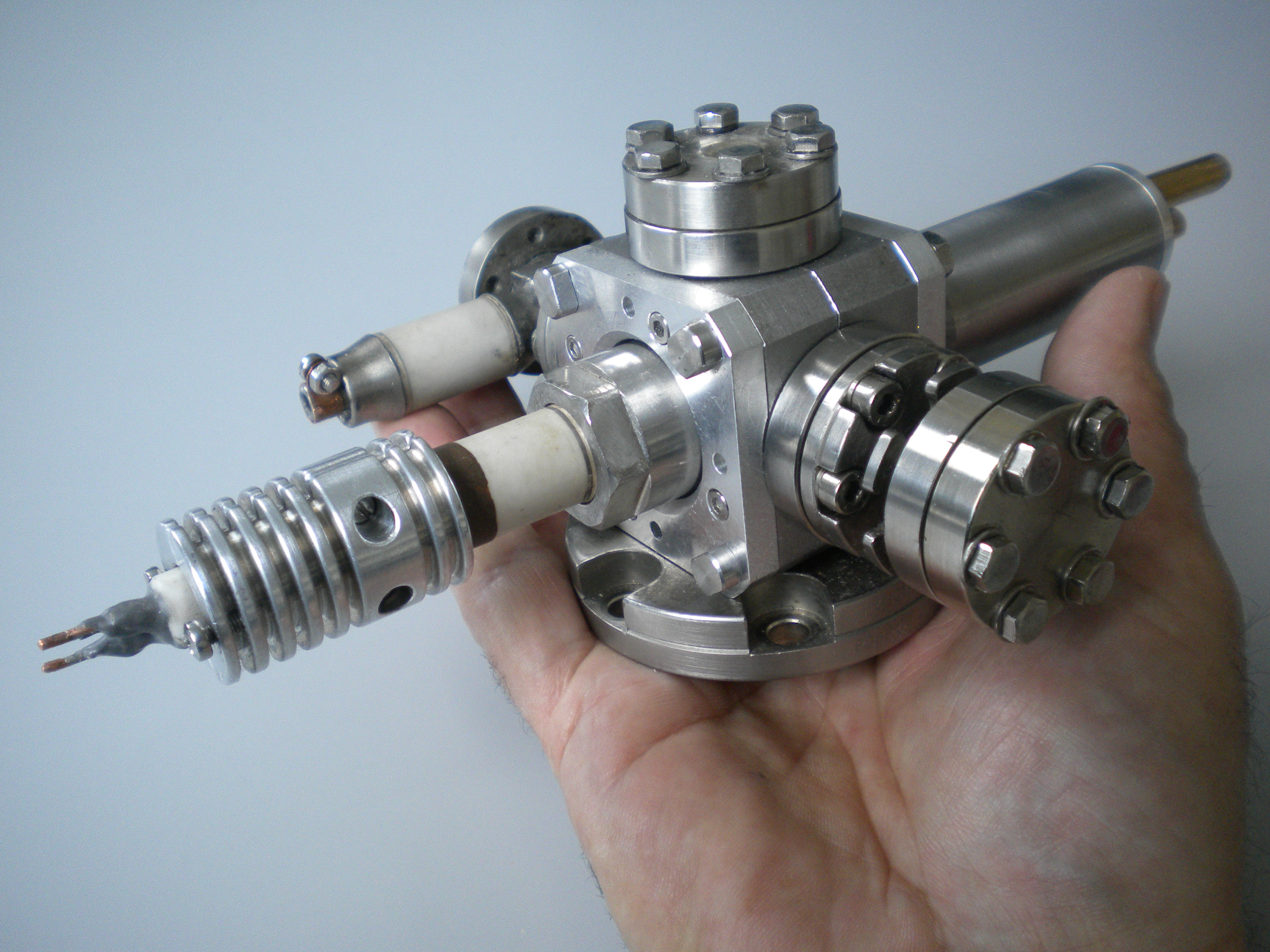
Photo: The MaMFIS operating at electron beam energy of up to 4 keV and electron current density of about 20 kA/cm^{2}.

Main Magnetic Focus Ion Source (MaMFIS) is a compact ion source with extremely high electron current density. The device is designed for production of ions of arbitrary elements in any charge states, in particular, of highly charged ions of heavy elements.

== Operation ==
Atomic ions are produced and confined in the local ion traps formed in crossovers of a rippled electron beam propagating in a drift tube. The electron beam is focused by a thick magnetic lens. In a sharp crossover, the electron current density can reach values, which significantly exceed that for the Brillouin focusing of laminar flow of electrons. The extraction of ions from the ion source can be realized in both axial and radial directions. Without the ion extraction, the MaMFIS is called the Main Magnetic Focus Ion Trap (MaMFIT) and serves as a source of characteristic radiation. The devices operate at room temperature due to the use of permanent magnets and standard vacuum techniques.

== Applications ==
The MaMFIS can be employed as a tool for fundamental investigations in microplasma physics, surface physics, and atomic physics (e.g., for spectroscopy measurements, study of parity nonconservation in highly charged ions and search for variation of fundamental constants), as well as for technological applications (e.g., in single ion implantation and ion-beam lithography).

Another application of such ion sources is the charge breeding of short-lived radioactive isotopes. Fast ionization of inner-shell electrons in atomic targets can allow one to exclude the decay channels caused by internal conversion and electron capture (inverse beta decay). Accordingly, the half-lives of nuclides can be increased by a few orders of magnitude. In this case, it seems feasible to expand the amount of short-lived radioactive species available for precision mass measurements.
