= DEAP =

Dark matter search experiment

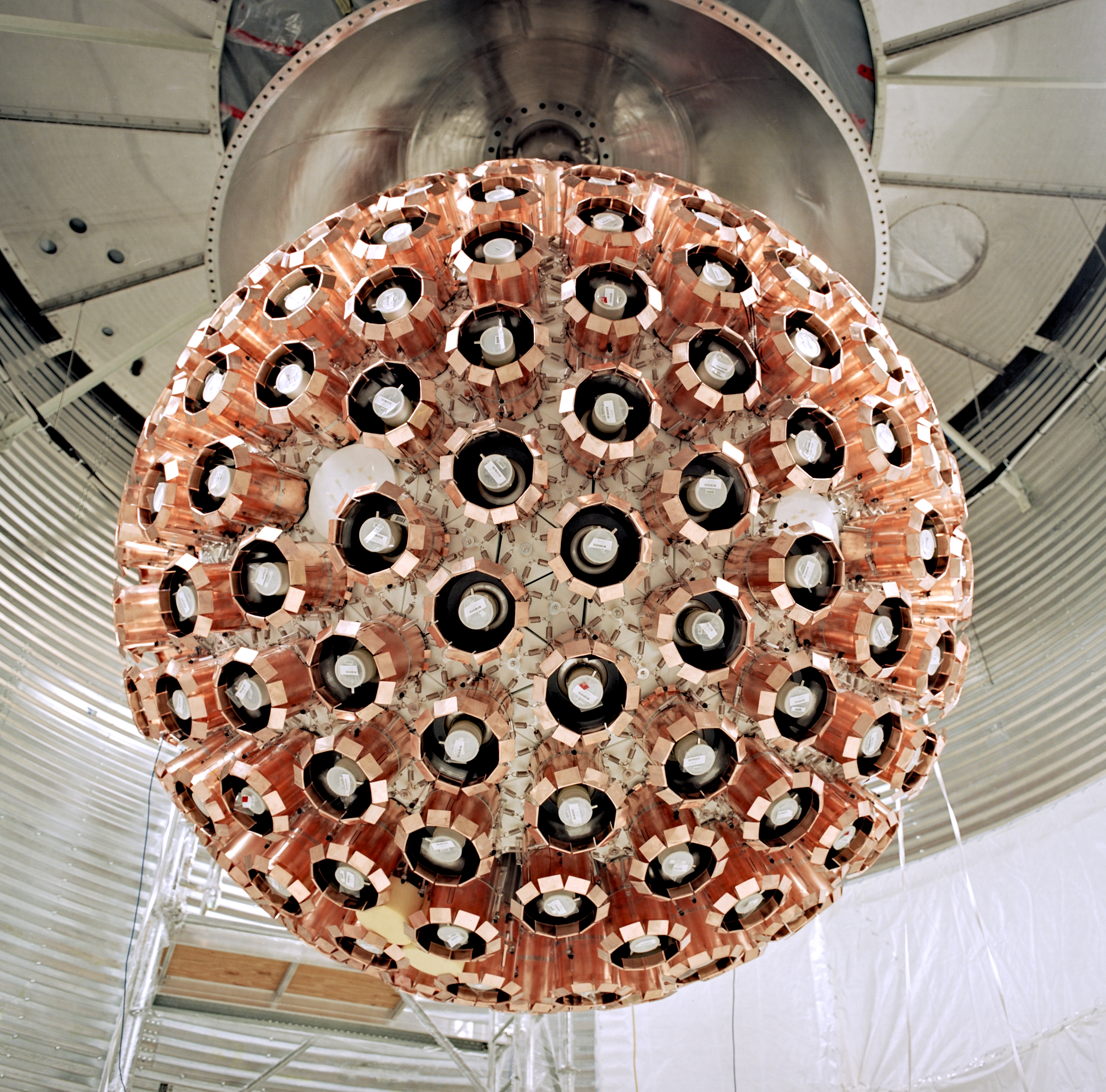
DEAP-3600 detector during construction in 2014

DEAP (Dark matter Experiment using Argon Pulse-shape discrimination) is a direct dark matter search experiment which uses liquid argon as a target material. DEAP utilizes background discrimination based on the characteristic scintillation pulse-shape of argon. A first-generation detector (DEAP-1) with a 7 kg target mass was operated at Queen's University to test the performance of pulse-shape discrimination at low recoil energies in liquid argon. DEAP-1 was then moved to SNOLAB, 2 km below Earth's surface, in October 2007 and collected data into 2011.

DEAP-3600 was designed with 3600 kg of active liquid argon mass to achieve sensitivity to WIMP-nucleon scattering cross-sections as low as 10^{−46} cm^{2} for a dark matter particle mass of 100 GeV/c^{2}. The DEAP-3600 detector finished construction and began data collection in 2016. An incident with the detector forced a short pause in the data collection in 2016. As of 2019, the experiment is collecting data.

To reach even better sensitivity to dark matter, the Global Argon Dark Matter Collaboration was formed with scientists from DEAP, DarkSide, CLEAN and ArDM experiments. A detector with a liquid argon mass above 20 tonnes (DarkSide-20k) is planned for operation at Laboratori Nazionali del Gran Sasso. Research and development efforts are working towards a next generation detector (ARGO) with a multi-hundred tonne liquid argon target mass designed to reach the neutrino floor, planned to operate at SNOLAB due to its extremely low-background radiation environment.

== Argon scintillation properties and background rejection ==
Since liquid argon is a scintillating material a particle interacting with it produces light in proportion to the energy deposited from the incident particle, this is a linear effect for low energies before quenching becomes a major contributing factor. The interaction of a particle with the argon causes ionization and recoiling along the path of interaction. The recoiling argon nuclei undergo recombination or self-trapping, ultimately resulting in the emission of 128 nm vacuum ultra-violet (VUV) photons. Additionally liquid argon has the unique property of being transparent to its own scintillation light, this allows for light yields of tens of thousands of photons produced for every MeV of energy deposited.

The elastic scattering of a WIMP dark matter particle with an argon nucleus is expected to cause the nucleus to recoil. This is expected to be a very low energy interaction (keV) and requires a low detection threshold in order to be sensitive. Due to the necessarily low detection threshold, the number of background events detected is very high. The faint signature of a dark matter particle such as a WIMP will be masked by the many different types of possible background events. A technique for identifying these non-dark matter events is pulse shape discrimination (PSD), which characterizes an event based on the timing signature of the scintillation light from liquid argon.

PSD is possible in a liquid argon detector because interactions due to different incident particles such as electrons, high energy photons, alphas, and neutrons create different proportions of excited states of the recoiling argon nuclei, these are known as singlet and triplet states and they decay with characteristic lifetimes of 6 ns and 1300 ns respectively. Interactions from gammas and electrons produce primarily triplet excited states through electronic recoils, while neutron and alpha interactions produce primarily singlet excited states through nuclear recoils. It is expected that WIMP-nucleon interactions also produce a nuclear recoil type signal due to the elastic scattering of the dark matter particle with the argon nucleus.

By using the arrival time distribution of light for an event, it is possible to identify its likely source. This is done quantitatively by measuring the ratio of the light measured by the photo-detectors in a "prompt" window (<60 ns) over the light measured in a "late" window (<10,000 ns). In DEAP this parameter is called Fprompt. Nuclear recoil type events have high Fprompt (~0.7) values while electronic recoil events have a low Fprompt value (~0.3). Due to this separation in Fprompt for WIMP-like (Nuclear Recoil) and background-like (Electronic Recoil) events, it is possible to uniquely identify the most dominant sources of background in the detector.

The most abundant background in DEAP comes from the beta decay of Argon-39 which has an activity of approximately 1 Bq/kg in atmospheric argon. Discrimination of beta and gamma background events from nuclear recoils in the energy region of interest (near 20 keV of electron energy) is required to be better than 1 in 10^{8} to sufficiently suppress these backgrounds for a dark matter search in liquid atmospheric argon.

== DEAP-1 ==
The first stage of the DEAP project, DEAP-1, was designed in order to characterize several properties of liquid argon, demonstrate pulse-shape discrimination, and refine engineering. This detector was too small to perform dark matter searches. DEAP-1 used 7 kg of liquid argon as a target for WIMP interactions. Two photomultiplier tubes (PMTs) were used to detect the scintillation light produced by a particle interacting with the liquid argon. As the scintillation light produced is of short wavelength (128 nm) a wavelength-shifting film was used to absorb the ultraviolet scintillation light and re-emit in the visible spectrum (440 nm) enabling the light to pass through ordinary windows without any losses and eventually be detected by the PMTs.

DEAP-1 demonstrated good pulse-shape discrimination of backgrounds on the surface and began operation at SNOLAB. The deep underground location reduced unwanted cosmogenic background events. DEAP-1 ran from 2007 to 2011, including two changes in the experimental setup. DEAP-1 characterized background events, determining design improvements needed in DEAP-3600.

== DEAP-3600 ==
The DEAP-3600 detector was designed to use 3600 kg of liquid argon, with a 1000 kg fiducial volume, the remaining volume is used as self-shielding and background veto. This is contained in a ~2 m diameter spherical acrylic vessel, the first of its kind ever created. The acrylic vessel is surrounded by 255 high quantum efficiency photomultiplier tubes (PMTs) to detect the argon scintillation light. The acrylic vessel is housed in a stainless steel shell submerged in a 7.8m diameter shield tank filled with ultra-pure water. The outside of the steel shell has additional 48 veto PMTs to detect Cherenkov radiation produced by incoming cosmic particles, primarily muons.

The materials used in the DEAP detector were required to adhere to strict radio-purity standards to reduce background event contamination. All materials used were assayed to determine levels of radiation present, and inner detector components had strict requirements for radon emanation, which emits alpha radiation from its decay daughters. The inner vessel is coated with wavelength shifting material TPB which was vacuum evaporated onto the surface. TPB is a common wavelength shifting material used in liquid argon and liquid xenon experiments due to its fast re-emission and high light yield, with an emission spectra peaked at 425 nm, in the sensitivity region for most PMTs.

The projected sensitivity of DEAP in terms of spin-independent WIMP-nucleus cross-section is 10^{−46} cm^{2} at 100 GeV/c^{2} after three live years of data taking.

== Collaborating institutions ==
Collaborating institutions include:

- University of Alberta
- AstroCeNT
- University of California, Riverside
- Canadian Nuclear Laboratories
- Carleton University
- CIEMAT
- INFN
- Kurchatov Institute
- Laurentian University
- Johannes Gutenberg University Mainz
- National Autonomous University of Mexico
- Princeton University
- Queen's University
- Royal Holloway University of London
- Rutherford Appleton Laboratory
- SNOLAB
- University of Sussex
- Technical University of Munich
- TRIUMF

This collaboration benefits largely from the experience many of the members and institutions gained on the Sudbury Neutrino Observatory (SNO) project, which studied neutrinos, another weakly interacting particle.

=== Status of DEAP-3600 ===
After construction was completed, the DEAP-3600 detector started taking commissioning and calibration data in February 2015 with nitrogen gas purge in the detector. The detector fill was completed and data-taking to search for dark matter was started on August 5, 2016. Shortly after the initial fill of the detector with liquid argon, a butyl O-ring seal failed on August 17, 2016 and contaminated the argon with 100 ppm of N_{2} The detector was then vented and re-filled, but this time to a level of 3300 kg to avoid a re-occurrence of the seal failure: this second fill was completed in November 2016. The first dark matter search results with an exposure of 4.44 live days from the initial fill were published in August 2017, giving a cross-section limit of 1.2×10^{−44} cm^{2} for a 100 GeV/c^{2} WIMP mass.

Improved sensitivity to dark matter was achieved in February 2019, with an analysis of data collected over 231 live days from the second fill in 2016-2017, giving a cross-section limit of 3.9×10^{−45} cm^{2} for a 100 GeV/c^{2} WIMP mass. This updated analysis demonstrated the best performance ever achieved in liquid argon at threshold, for the pulse-shape discrimination technique against beta and gamma backgrounds. The collaboration also developed new techniques to reject rare nuclear recoil backgrounds, using the observed distribution of light in space and time after a scintillation event.

In January 2022 the experiment published its results setting constraints for dark matter with Planck-scale mass with mass between 8.3×10^{6} GeV/c^{2} and 1.2×10^{19} GeV/c^{2} and cross section from 1×10^{−23} cm^{2} to 2.4×10^{−18} cm^{2}. These were the first results for dark matter on this super-heavy mass scale.

The DEAP-3600 experiment is currently (as of June 2024) undergoing upgrades and the team will operate it for another couple of years with even better sensitivity to dark matter.
