= SuperNova Early Warning System =

Network of neutrino detectors for alerting astronomers to nearby supernovae

The SuperNova Early Warning System (SNEWS) is a network of neutrino detectors designed to give early warning to astronomers in the event of a supernova in the Milky Way, our home galaxy, or in a nearby galaxy such as the Large Magellanic Cloud.

SNEWS has been operating since 2005. As of March 2021, it has not issued any supernova alerts. This is unsurprising, as supernovae appear to be rare: the most recent known supernova remnant in the Milky Way was around the turn of the 20th century, and the most recent Milky Way supernova confirmed to have been observed was Kepler's Supernova in 1604.

== SNEWS 2.0 ==
In June 2019 a "SNEWS 2.0" workshop was held at Laurentian University of Sudbury in Canada, focused on plans for an update of SNEWS. As the result, an upgraded system was devised under the name "SNEWS 2.0".

== Neutrino detection ==
Powerful bursts of electron neutrinos (ν_{e}) with typical energies of the order of 10 MeV and duration of the order of 10 seconds are produced in the core of a red giant star as it collapses on itself via the "neutronization" reaction, i.e. fusion of protons and electrons into neutrons and neutrinos: p + e^{−} → n + ν_{e}. It is expected that the neutrinos are emitted well before the light from the supernova peaks, so in principle neutrino detectors could give warning to astronomers that a supernova has occurred and may soon be visible. The neutrino pulse from supernova 1987A arrived 3 hours before the associated photons – but SNEWS was not yet active and it was not recognised as a supernova event until after the photons arrived.

Directional precision of approximately 5° is expected. SNEWS is not able to give warning of a Type Ia supernova, as they are not expected to produce significant numbers of neutrinos. Type Ia supernovae, caused by a runaway nuclear fusion reaction in a white dwarf star, are thought to account for roughly one-third of all supernovae.

There are currently seven neutrino detector members of SNEWS: Borexino, Daya Bay, KamLAND, HALO, IceCube, LVD, and Super-Kamiokande. SNEWS began operation prior to 2004, with three members (Super-Kamiokande, LVD, and SNO). The Sudbury Neutrino Observatory is no longer active as it is being upgraded to its successor program SNO+.

The detectors send reports of a possible supernova to a computer at Brookhaven National Laboratory to identify a supernova. If the SNEWS computer identifies signals from two detectors within 10 seconds, the computer will send a supernova alert to observatories around the world to study the supernova. The SNEWS mailing list is open-subscription, and the general public is allowed to sign up; however, the SNEWS collaboration encourages amateur astronomers to instead use Sky and Telescope magazine's AstroAlert service, which is linked to SNEWS.

== See also ==
- Near-Earth supernova
- History of supernova observation
- Timeline of white dwarfs, neutron stars, and supernovae
- Supernova nucleosynthesis
- Supernova neutrinos
