= Helium and Lead Observatory =

Neutrino detector in Canada

Coordinates: 46.4719°N 81.1866°W

The Helium And Lead Observatory (HALO) is a neutrino detector at SNOLab for the Supernova Early Warning System (SNEWS).

== Observatory ==
It began engineering operation on May 8, 2012, and joined as an operational part of SNEWS in October 2015.

It was designed to be a low-cost, low-maintenance detector with limited capabilities sufficient for the burst of neutrinos generated by a nearby supernova. Its major components are left over from other decommissioned experiments: 76 tons of lead from an earlier cosmic-ray experiment, and 128 three-metre-long helium-3 neutron detectors from the Sudbury Neutrino Observatory.

The idea of using lead to detect supernova neutrinos was originally proposed in 1996 by Cliff Hargrove as the "lead astronomical neutrino detector" (LAND), and in 2004, Charles Duba, then a PhD student working on SNO, proposed re-using them for this purpose, prompting the renaming to HALO. Design of the current detector began in 2007.

When an electron neutrino collides with a lead nucleus, it causes a nuclear transmutation that ends with a neutron emission. Lead does not absorb neutrons readily since ^{208}Pb it has a "magic number" of both protons and neutrons, so the neutrons pass through to the ^{3}He detectors. If enough neutrons are detected in a short time, an alert is generated.

One limitation of the detector's design is its small size; due to the limited amount of surplus lead available, half of the neutrons generated escape before hitting a neutron detector. To mitigate this, it is surrounded by a layer of water to reflect some of the neutrons back in. Budget permitting, there are plans for a larger detector using 1000 t of lead and the remaining leftover ^{3}He detectors (Due to lead's high density; 1000 t is a cube 4.45 m (14.6 ft) on a side, not an impractical size for underground installation.)
