= Solar neutrino unit =

The solar neutrino unit (SNU) is a unit of Solar neutrino flux widely used in neutrino astronomy and radiochemical neutrino experiments. It is equal to the neutrino flux producing 10^{−36} captures per target atom per second. It is convenient given the very low event rates in radiochemical experiments. Typical rate is expected to be from tens SNU to hundred SNU.

There are two ways of detecting solar neutrinos: radiochemical and real time experiments. The principle of radiochemical experiments is the reaction of the form

$$\ce{^\mathit{A}_\mathit{Z} X} + \nu_{e} \longrightarrow \ce{^\mathit{A}_{\mathit{Z}{+}1}Y} + e^{-} .$$
where X is the parent nucleus with atomic number Z and mass number A, and Y is the daughter nucleus with atomic number Z+1 and mass number A.

The daughter nucleus's decay is used in the detection. Production rate of the daughter nucleus is given by
$$R = N\int\Phi(E)\sigma(E) \, dE,$$
where

- $\Phi$ is the solar neutrino flux
- $\sigma$ is the cross section for the radiochemical reaction
- $N$ is the number of target atoms.

With typical neutrino flux of 10^{10} cm^{−2} s^{−1} and a typical interaction cross section of about 10^{−45} cm^{2}, about 10^{30} target atoms are required to produce one event per day. Taking into account that 1 mole is equal to 6.022×10^{23} atoms, this number corresponds to ktons of the target substances, whereas present neutrino detectors operate at much lower quantities of those.

== See also ==
- Neutrino
- Neutrino detector
- Mole (unit)
- Solar neutrino
- Terrestrial Neutrino Units (TNU)

== Links ==
- Bellerive, A. (2004). "Review of Solar Neutrino Experiments". International Journal of Modern Physics A. 19 (8): 1167–1179. arXiv:hep-ex/0312045. Bibcode:2004IJMPA..19.1167B. doi:10.1142/S0217751X04019093. S2CID 16980300.
