= Cryogenic Low-Energy Astrophysics with Neon =

The Cryogenic Low-Energy Astrophysics with Noble liquids (CLEAN) experiment by the DEAP/CLEAN collaboration is searching for dark matter using noble gases at the SNOLAB underground facility. CLEAN has studied neon and argon in the MicroCLEAN prototype, and running the MiniCLEAN detector to test a multi-ton design.

== Design ==
Dark matter searches in isolated noble gas scintillators with xenon and argon have set limits on WIMP interactions, such as recent cross sections from LUX and XENON. Particles scattering in the target emit photons detected by PMTs, identified via pulse shape discrimination developed on DEAP results. Shielding reduces the cosmic and radiation background. Neon has been studied as a clear, dense, low-background scintillator. CLEAN can use neon or argon and plans runs with both to study nuclear mass dependence of any WIMP signals.

== Status ==
The MiniCLEAN detector will operate with argon in 2014. It will have 500 kg of noble cryogen in a spherical steel vessel with 92 PMTs shielded in a water tank with muon rejection.
