= Large Volume Detector =

Particle physics experiment since 1992

The Large Volume Detector (LVD) is a particle physics experiment situated in the Gran Sasso laboratory in Italy and is operated by the Italian Institute of Nuclear Physics (INFN). It has been in operation since June 1992, and is a member of the Supernova Early Warning System. Among other work, the detector should be able to detect neutrinos from our galaxy and possibly nearby galaxies. The LVD uses 840 scintillator counters around a large tank of hydrocarbons. The detector can detect both charged current and neutral current interactions.

In 2012, they published the results of measurements of the speed of CERN Neutrinos to Gran Sasso. The results were consistent with the speed of light. See measurements of neutrino speed.
