= 2,5-Diphenyloxazole =

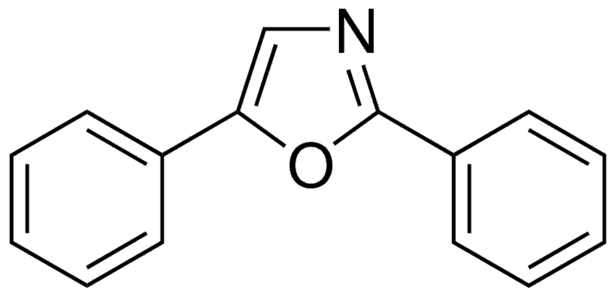

Names
- Preferred IUPAC name 2,5-Diphenyl-1,3-oxazole
- Other names PPO, DPO, POP

Identifiers
CAS Number	92-71-7
3D model (JSmol)	Interactive image
ChemSpider	6838
ECHA InfoCard	100.001.984
EC Number	202-181-3
PubChem CID	7105
UNII	2P8A647RYF
CompTox Dashboard (EPA)	DTXSID7059060
- InChI: InChI=1S/C15H11NO/c1-3-7-12(8-4-1)14-11-16-15(17-14)13-9-5-2-6-10-13/h1-11H Key: CNRNYORZJGVOSY-UHFFFAOYSA-N
- SMILES: C1=CC=C(C=C1)C2=CN=C(O2)C3=CC=CC=C3

Properties
Chemical formula	C_{15}H_{11}NO
Molar mass	221.259 g·mol^{−1}
Appearance	greenish powder
Density	1.094 g/cm^{3} (100 °C)
Melting point	71 °C (160 °F; 344 K)
Boiling point	360 °C (680 °F; 633 K)
Refractive index (n_{D})	1.6231 (100 °C)

Hazards
- GHS labelling
Pictograms	(GHS07: Exclamation mark)
Signal word	Warning
Hazard statements	H302, H319, H413
Precautionary statements	P264, P264+P265, P270, P273, P280, P301+P317, P305+P351+P338, P330, P337+P317, P501
- Except where otherwise noted, data are given for materials in their standard state (at 25 °C [77 °F], 100 kPa). verify (what is ?) Infobox references

2,5-Diphenyloxazole (PPO) is an organic scintillator. It is used as a wavelength shifter (also called a "primary shifter" or "fluor"), which means that it converts shorter wavelength light to longer wavelength light. Its output spectrum peaks at 385 nm, which is in the range of UV light.

PPO was used as the scintillator in the Borexino solar neutrino experiment, which led to precision spectroscopy of Solar neutrinos, as well as the discovery of geoneutrinos.
