= Kamioka Liquid Scintillator Antineutrino Detector =

Neutrino oscillation experiment in Japan

Coordinates: 36.4225°N 137.3153°E

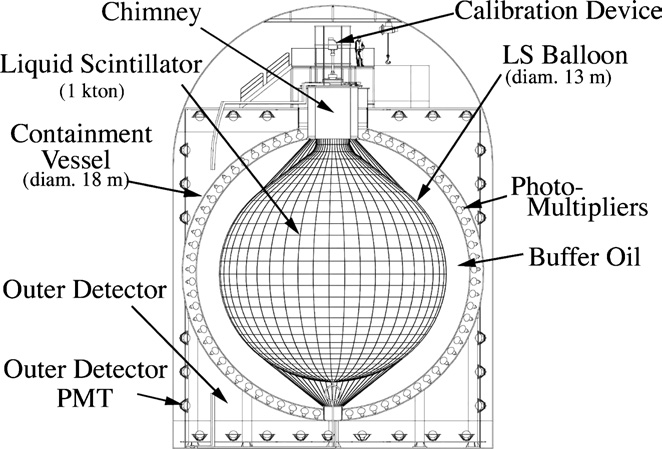
Schematic of the KamLAND detector

The Kamioka Liquid Scintillator Antineutrino Detector (KamLAND) is an electron antineutrino detector at the Kamioka Observatory, an underground neutrino detection facility in Hida, Gifu, Japan. The device is situated in a drift mine shaft in the old KamiokaNDE cavity in the Japanese Alps. Although located in the Kamioka Observatory, which is part of the University of Tokyo, this project is conducted by a team at Tohoku University. The site is surrounded by 53 Japanese commercial nuclear reactors. Nuclear reactors produce electron antineutrinos ($\bar{\nu}_e$) during the decay of radioactive fission products in the nuclear fuel. Like the intensity of light from a light bulb or a distant star, the isotropically-emitted $\bar{\nu}_e$ flux decreases at 1/R^{2} per increasing distance R from the reactor. The device is sensitive up to an estimated 25% of antineutrinos from nuclear reactors that exceed the threshold energy of 1.8 megaelectronvolts (MeV) and thus produces a signal in the detector.

If neutrinos have mass, they may oscillate into flavors that an experiment may not detect, leading to a further dimming, or "disappearance," of the electron antineutrinos. KamLAND is located at an average flux-weighted distance of approximately 180 kilometers from the reactors, which makes it sensitive to the mixing of neutrinos associated with large mixing angle (LMA) solutions to the solar neutrino problem.

== KamLAND Detector ==
The KamLAND detector's outer layer consists of an 18 meter-diameter stainless steel containment vessel with an inner lining of 1,879 photo-multiplier tubes (1325 17" and 554 20" PMTs). Photocathode coverage is 34%. Its second, inner layer consists of a 13 m-diameter nylon balloon filled with a liquid scintillator composed of 1,000 metric tons of mineral oil, benzene, and fluorescent chemicals. Non-scintillating, highly purified oil provides buoyancy for the balloon and acts as a buffer to keep the balloon away from the photo-multiplier tubes; the oil also shields against external radiation. A 3.2 kiloton cylindrical water Cherenkov detector surrounds the containment vessel, acting as a muon veto counter and providing shielding from cosmic rays and radioactivity from the surrounding rock.

Electron antineutrinos (ν̅_{e}) are detected through the Inverse beta decay reaction $\bar{\nu}_e + p \to e^+ + n$, which has a 1.8 MeV $\bar{\nu}_e$ energy threshold. The prompt scintillation light from the positron ($e^+$) gives an estimate of the incident antineutrino energy, $E_{\nu} = E_{prompt} + <E_n> + 0.9 MeV$, where $E_{prompt}$ is the prompt event energy including the positron kinetic energy and the $e^+e^-$ annihilation energy. The quantity <$E_n$> is the average neutron recoil energy, which is only a few tens of kiloelectronvolts (keV). The neutron is captured on hydrogen approximately 200 microseconds (μs) later, emitting a characteristic 2.2 MeV γ ray. This delayed-coincidence signature is a very powerful tool for distinguishing antineutrinos from backgrounds produced by other particles.

To compensate for the loss in $\bar{\nu}_e$ flux due to the long baseline, KamLAND has a much larger detection volume compared to earlier devices. The KamLAND detector uses a 1,000-metric-ton detection mass, which is over twice the size of similar detectors, such as Borexino. However, the increased volume of the detector also demands more shielding from cosmic rays, requiring the detector be placed underground.

As part of the Kamland-Zen double beta decay search, a balloon of scintillator with 320 kg of dissolved xenon was suspended in the center of the detector in 2011. A cleaner rebuilt balloon is planned with additional xenon. KamLAND-PICO is a planned project that will install the PICO-LON detector in KamLand to search for dark matter. PICO-LON is a radiopure NaI(Tl) crystal that observes inelastic WIMP-nucleus scattering. Improvements to the detector are planned, adding light collecting mirrors and PMTs with higher quantum efficiency.

== Results ==
=== Neutrino oscillation ===
KamLAND started to collect data on January 17, 2002. First results were reported using only 145 days of data. Without neutrino oscillation, 86.8±5.6 events were expected, however, only 54 events were observed. KamLAND confirmed this result with a 515-day data sample, 365.2 events were predicted in the absence of oscillation, and 258 events were observed. These results established antineutrino disappearance at high significance.

The KamLAND detector not only counts the antineutrino rate, but also measures their energy. The shape of this energy spectrum carries additional information that can be used to investigate neutrino oscillation hypotheses. Statistical analyses in 2005 show the spectrum distortion is inconsistent with the no-oscillation hypothesis and two alternative disappearance mechanisms, namely the neutrino decay and de-coherence models. It is consistent with 2-neutrino oscillation and a fit provides the values for the Δm^{2} and θ parameters. Since KamLAND measures Δm^{2} most precisely and the solar experiments exceed KamLAND's ability to measure θ, the most precise oscillation parameters are obtained in combination with solar results. Such a combined fit gives $\Delta{m^2} = 7.9^{+0.6}_{-0.5} \cdot 10^{-5} \text{eV}^2$ and $\tan^2\theta = 0.40^{+0.10}_{-0.07}$ , the best neutrino oscillation parameter determination to that date. Since then a 3 neutrino model has been used.

Precision combined measurements were reported in 2008 and 2011:

$$\Delta m_{21}^2 = 7.59 \pm 0.21 \cdot 10^{-5} \, \text{eV}^2,\,\, \tan^2 \theta _{12} = 0.47^{+0.06}_{-0.05}$$

=== Geological antineutrinos (geoneutrinos) ===
KamLAND also published an investigation of geologically-produced antineutrinos (so-called geoneutrinos) in 2005. These neutrinos are produced in the decay of thorium and uranium in the Earth's crust and mantle. A few geoneutrinos were detected and these limited data were used to limit the U/Th radiopower to under 60TW.

Combination results with Borexino were published in 2011, measuring the U/Th heat flux.

New results in 2013, benefiting from the reduced backgrounds due to Japanese reactor shutdowns, were able to constrain U/Th radiogenic heat production to $11.2^{+7.9}_{-5.1}$ TW using 116 $\bar{\nu}_e$ events. This constrains composition models of the bulk silicate Earth and agrees with the reference Earth model.

=== KamLAND-Zen Double Beta Decay Search ===
KamLAND-Zen uses the detector to study beta decay of ^{136}Xe from a balloon placed in the scintillator in summer 2011. Observations set a limit for neutrinoless double-beta decay half-life of 1.9×10^{25} yr. A double beta decay lifetime was also measured: $2.38 \pm{0.02(\mathrm{stat})} \pm{0.14(\mathrm{syst})} *10^{21}$ yr, consistent with other xenon studies. KamLAND-Zen plans continued observations with more enriched Xe and improved detector components.

An improved search was published in August 2016, increasing the half-life limit to 1.07×10^{26} yr, with a neutrino mass bound of 61–165 meV.

The first KamLAND-Zen apparatus, KamLAND-Zen 400, completed two research programs, Phase I (2011 Oct. - 2012 Jun.) and Phase II (2013 Dec. - 2015 Oct.). The combined data of Phase I and II implied the lower bound $1.07 \times 10^{26}$ years for the neutrinoless double beta decay half-life. The KamLAND-Zen 400 operated from 2011 October to 2015 October and was then replaced by KamLAND-Zen 800.

The second KamLAND-Zen experiment apparatus, KamLAND-Zen 800, with bigger balloon of about 750 kg of Xenon was installed in the KamLAND detector 10 May 2018. The operation was expected to start winter 2018-2019 with 5 years of expected operation.

The KamLAND-Zen 800 experiment started data taking in January 2019 and first results were published in 2020. In January 2023, the KamLAND-Zen Collaboration using the KamLAND-Zen 800 published results about neutrinoless double-beta decay in Xe-136 using data collected between February 5, 2019 and May 8, 2021. No neutrinoless double-beta decay was observed, and the established lower bound for half-life was T > $2.3 \times 10^{26}$ yr corresponding to upper limits on the effective Majorana neutrino mass of 36–156 meV. Further results published in December 2025 increase the half-life lower bound to T > $3.8 \times 10^{26}$ yr, corresponding to a mass of 28–122 meV.

The KamLAND-Zen collaboration is planning to construct another apparatus, KamLAND2-Zen in the long term.
