= SNOLAB =

Canadian neutrino laboratory

Coordinates: 46°28.3′N 81°11.2′W

SNOLAB is a Canadian deep underground science laboratory specializing in neutrino and dark matter physics, quantum technology, and life sciences. Located 2 km below the surface in Vale's Creighton nickel mine near Sudbury, Ontario, SNOLAB is an expansion of the existing facilities constructed for the original Sudbury Neutrino Observatory (SNO) solar neutrino experiment.

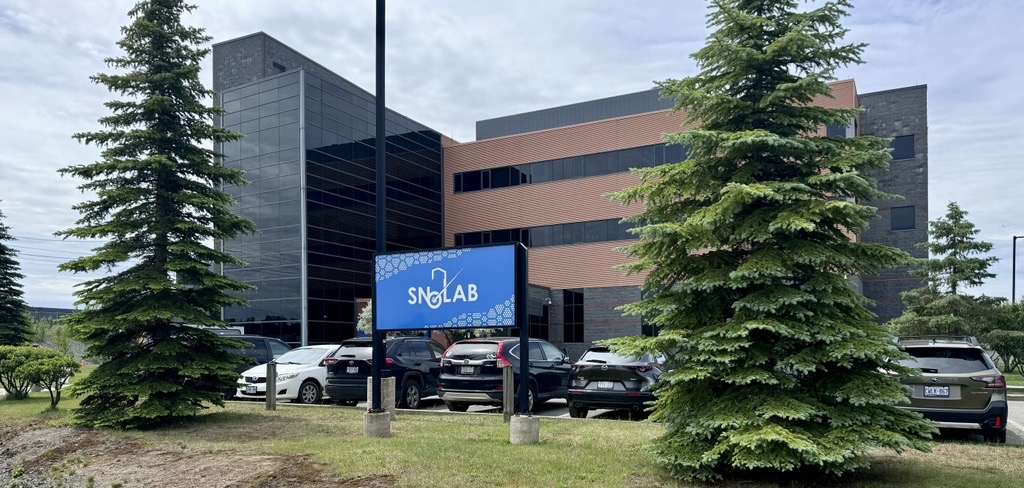
SNOLAB surface building. Access to the underground facilities is provided via the nearby mine elevator operated by Vale Limited

SNOLAB is the world's deepest operational clean room facility. Although accessed through an active mine, the laboratory proper is maintained as a class-2000 cleanroom, with very low levels of dust and background radiation. SNOLAB's 2070 m (6800 feet) of overburden rock provides 6010 metre water equivalent (MWE) shielding from cosmic rays, providing a low-background environment for experiments requiring high sensitivities and extremely low counting rates. The combination of great depth and cleanliness that SNOLAB affords allows extremely rare interactions and weak processes to be studied. In addition to neutrino and dark matter physics, SNOLAB has expanded its research portfolio to include life sciences and quantum technology experiments in a deep underground environment.

== History ==
The success of SNO and a strong working relationship with Inco (later Vale) meant plans to expand the lab were already in the works as SNO was still collecting data. In 2002, funding was approved by the Canada Foundation for Innovation to expand the SNO facilities into a general-purpose laboratory, and more funding was received in 2007 and 2008. Construction of the major laboratory space was completed in 2009, with the entire lab entering operation as a 'clean' space in March 2011.

The SNOLAB expansion added an additional 6,300 m2 of excavations, of which 3,700 m2 is clean room space, attached to the existing facility. The clean/dirty boundary was moved for the expanded laboratory and some existing excavations were converted to additional clean space.

Because of the expansion, SNOLAB evolved from a single-experiment site to an internationally recognized multi-experiment facility. Its success in particle physics and unique low-radioactivity environment have attracted new experiments in dark matter searches, life sciences, nuclear security, and quantum technology.

SNOLAB remains one of the deepest underground labs in the world. Although China's CJPL has more rock (2.4 km) above it, the effective depth for science purposes is determined by the cosmic ray muon flux, and CJPL's mountain location admits more muons from the side than SNOLAB's flat overburden. The measured muon fluxes are 0.27 μ/m²/day (3.1×10^{−10} μ/cm²/s) at SNOLAB, and 0.305±0.020 μ/m²/day ((3.53±0.23)×10^{−10} μ/cm²/s) at CJPL, tied to within the measurement uncertainty. (For comparison, the rate on the surface, at sea level, is about 15 million μ/m²/day.)

CJPL does have the advantage of fewer radioisotopes in the surrounding rock.

== Experiments ==
As of July 2025, SNOLAB hosts the following experiments:

=== Neutrino detectors ===
- SNO+ is a neutrino experiment using the original SNO experiment chamber, but using liquid scintillator in the place of heavy water from SNO. Linear alkyl benzene, the scintillator, increases the light yield, and therefore the sensitivity, allowing SNO+ to detect not only solar neutrinos, but also geoneutrinos, and reactor neutrinos. The ultimate goal of SNO+ is to observe neutrinoless double beta decay (0vbb). A 2023 paper has also demonstrated its ability to monitor nuclear reactors.
- HALO (Helium and Lead Observatory) is a neutron detector using ring-shaped lead blocks to detect neutrinos from supernovae within our galaxy. HALO is part of the Supernova Early Warning System (SNEWS), an international collaboration of neutrino-sensitive detectors that will allow astronomers the opportunity to observe the first photons visible following a core-collapse supernova.

=== Dark matter detectors ===
- DAMIC – Dark Matter in Charged Coupled Devices (CCDs) – a dark matter detector using unusually thick CCDs to take long exposure images of particles passing through the detector. Various particles have known signatures and DAMIC seeks to find something new that could signal dark matter particles.
- DEAP-3600 – Dark Matter Experiment using Argon Pulse-shape Discrimination – is a second generation dark matter detector, using 3600 kg of liquid argon. This experiment aims to detect WIMP-like dark matter particles through argon scintillation, producing small amounts of light that is detected by extremely sensitive photomultiplier tubes.
- The PICO 40L, a third generation bubble chamber dark matter search experiment, is a merger of the former PICASSO and COUPP collaborations. PICO operates using superheated fluids which form small bubbles when energy is deposited by particle interactions. These bubbles are then detected by high speed cameras and extremely sensitive microphones.
- NEWS-G – New Experiments with Spheres–Gas – is a second generation spherical proportional counter electrostatic dark matter detector using noble gases in their gaseous state, as opposed to liquid noble gases used in DEAP-3600 and miniCLEAN. The original NEWS experiment is at the Laboratoire Souterrain de Modane.

=== Biological experiments ===
- FLAME – Flies in A Mine Experiment – a biological experiment using fruit flies as a model organism to investigate the physical responses to working in increased atmospheric pressure underground.
- REPAIR – Researching the Effects of the Presence and Absence of Ionizing Radiation – a biological experiment investigating the effects of low background radiation on growth, development, and cellular repair mechanisms.

=== Projects under construction ===
- SuperCDMS – Super-Cryogenic Dark Matter Search – is a second generation dark matter detector using silicon and germanium crystals cooled down to 10 mK, a fraction of a degree above absolute zero. This experiment aims to detect low mass dark matter particles through very small energy deposition in the crystal from particle collisions, resulting in vibrations detected by sensors.
- PICO-500 is the next generation detector that builds upon the principle demonstrated by PICO-2L, −60, and −40L. PICO-500 will have an active volume of about 250 litres and will use a synthetic quartz vessel, just like versions before it. The PICO collaboration completed the design and is in the process of assembling and constructing the detector in SNOLAB's Cube Hall. PICO is planning to operate PICO-500 with C3F8 to achieve a world leading sensitivity for dark matter coupling to ordinary matter though its spin.

=== Decommissioned experiments ===
- The original heavy water based Sudbury Neutrino Observatory experiment,
- The POLARIS underground project at SNOLAB (PUPS), observing seismic signals at depth in very hard rock,
- The first-generation COUPP 4-kg bubble chamber dark matter search, is no longer in operation.
- The DEAP-1 dark matter search, and
- The PICASSO dark matter search.
- MiniCLEAN (Cryogenic Low-Energy Astrophysics with Noble gases) dark matter detector,

=== Future projects ===
Additional planned experiments have requested laboratory space such as the next-generation nEXO, and the LEGEND-1000 searches for neutrinoless double beta decay. There are also plans for a larger PICO-500L detector. In 2024, SNOLAB announced plans to host its first quantum computing experiment which will investigate the performance of superconducting qubits when shielded from cosmic rays.

The total size of the SNOLAB underground facilities, including utility spaces and personnel spaces, is:

	Excavated	Clean room	Laboratory
Floor space	7,215 m² 77,636 ft²	4,942 m² 53,180 ft²	3,055 m² 32,877 ft²
Volume	46,648 m³ 1,647,134 ft³	37,241 m³ 1,314,973 ft³	29,555 m³ 1,043,579 ft³
