= Meter water equivalent =

Unit of nuclear and particle physics

In physics, the meter water equivalent (often m.w.e. or mwe) is a standard measure of cosmic ray attenuation in underground laboratories. A laboratory at a depth of 1000 m.w.e is shielded from cosmic rays equivalently to a lab 1,000 m (3,300 ft) below the surface of a body of water. Because laboratories at the same depth (in meters) can have greatly varied levels of cosmic ray penetration, the m.w.e. provides a convenient and consistent way of comparing cosmic ray levels in different underground locations.

Cosmic ray attenuation is dependent on the density of the material of the overburden, so the m.w.e. is defined as the product of depth and density (also known as an interaction depth). Because the density of water is 1 g/cm^{3}, 1 m (100 cm) of water gives an interaction depth of 1 hectogram per square centimetre (100 g/cm^{2}). Some publications use hg/cm^{2} instead of m.w.e., although the two units are equivalent.

For example, the Waste Isolation Pilot Plant, located 660 m (2,170 ft) deep in a salt formation, achieves 1585 m.w.e. shielding. Soudan Mine, at 713 m (2,339 ft) depth is only 8% deeper, but because it is in denser iron-rich rock it achieves 2100 m.w.e. shielding, 32% more.

Another factor that must be accounted for is the shape of the overburden. While some laboratories are located beneath a flat ground surface, many are located in tunnels in mountains. Thus, the distance to the surface in directions other than straight up is less than it would be assuming a flat surface. This can increase the muon flux by a factor of 4±2.

The usual conversion between m.w.e. and total muon flux is given by Mei and Hime:

$$I_\mu(h_0) = 67.97\times 10^{-6} e^{-h_0/285} + 2.071\times 10^{-6} e^{-h_0/698}$$

where $h_0$ is the depth in m.w.e. and $I_\mu$ is the total muon flux per cm^{2}⋅s. (The first term dominates for depths up to 1681.5 m.w.e.; below that, the second term dominates. Thus, for great depths, the factor of 4 mentioned above corresponds to a difference of 698 ln 4 ≈ 968 m.w.e.)

== Standard rock ==
In addition to m.w.e., underground laboratory depth can also be measured in meters of standard rock. Standard rock is defined to have mass number A = 22, atomic number Z = 11, and density 2.65 g/cm^{3} (43.4 g/cu in). Because most laboratories are under earth and not underwater, the depth in standard rock is often closer to the actual underground depth of the laboratory.

== Existing underground laboratories ==
Underground laboratories exist at depths ranging from just below ground level to approximately 6000 m.w.e. at SNOLAB and 6700 m.w.e. at the Jinping Underground Laboratory in China.
