= Borexino =

Former neutrino physics experiment in Italy

Coordinates: 42.46°N 13.57°E

Borexino neutrino observatory
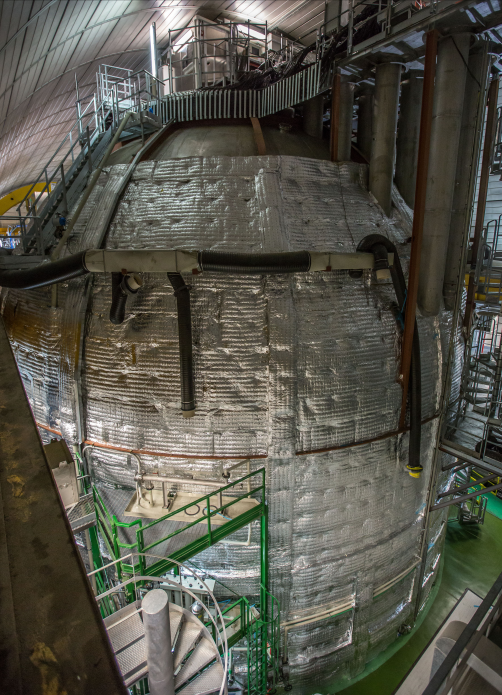
- Borexino from the North side of LNGS's underground Hall C in September 2015. It is shown close to being completely covered in thermal insulation (seen as a silvery wrapping), providing a relatively cost-effective way to further improve its unprecedented radiopurity levels.

Detector characteristics
- Location: Laboratori Nazionali del Gran Sasso
- Start of data-taking: 2007
- End of data-taking: 2021
- Detection technique: Elastic scattering on liquid scintillator (PC+PPO)
- Height: 16.9 m
- Width: 18 m
- Active mass(volume): 278 tonnes (315 m^{3}) ≈100 tonnes fiducial

Borexino was a deep underground particle physics experiment to study low energy (sub-MeV) solar neutrinos. The detector was the world's most radio-pure liquid scintillator calorimeter and was protected by 3,800 meters of water-equivalent depth (a volume of overhead rock equivalent in shielding power to that depth of water). The scintillator was pseudocumene and PPO which was held in place by a thin nylon sphere. It was placed within a stainless steel sphere which held the photomultiplier tubes (PMTs) used as signal detectors and was shielded by a water tank to protect it against external radiation. Outward pointing PMT's look for any outward facing light flashes to tag incoming cosmic muons that manage to penetrate the overburden of the mountain above. Neutrino energy could be determined through the number of photoelectrons measured in the PMT's, while the position could be determined by extrapolating the difference in arrival times of photons at PMT's throughout the chamber.

The primary aim of the experiment was to make a precise measurement of the individual neutrino fluxes from the Sun and compare them to the Standard Solar Model predictions. This was done to allow scientists to test and to further understand the functioning of the Sun (e.g., nuclear fusion processes taking place at the core of the Sun, Solar composition, opacity, matter distribution, etc.) and to also help determine properties of neutrino oscillations, including the MSW effect. Specific goals of the experiment were to detect beryllium-7, boron-8, pp, pep and CNO solar neutrinos as well as anti-neutrinos from the Earth and nuclear power plants. The project could also have detected neutrinos from supernovae within our galaxy with a special potential to detect the elastic scattering of neutrinos onto protons, due to neutral current interactions. Borexino was a member of the Supernova Early Warning System. Searches for rare processes and potential unknown particles were also undertaken.

The name Borexino was the Italian diminutive of BOREX (Boron solar neutrino Experiment), after the original 1 kT-fiducial experimental proposal with a different scintillator (TMB) was discontinued because of a shift in focus in physics goals as well as financial constraints. The experiment was located at the Laboratori Nazionali del Gran Sasso near the town of L'Aquila, Italy, and was supported by an international collaboration with researchers from Italy, the United States, Germany, France, Poland, Russia and Ukraine. The experiment was funded by multiple national agencies; the principal ones were INFN (National Institute for Nuclear Physics, Italy) and NSF (National Science Foundation, USA).

The SOX experiment was a sub-project designed to study the possible existence of sterile neutrinos or other anomalous effects in neutrino oscillations at short ranges through the use of a neutrino generator based on radioactive cerium-144 placed under the water tank of the Borexino detector. This project was cancelled in early 2018 due to the cancellation in 2017 of the contract for cerium-144 by the Russian Mayak fuel reprocessing plant. The cancellation was thought to be connected to the anomalous airborne radioactivity increase in Europe during the autumn of 2017, whose source was eventually localized to the Mayak reprocessing plant.

The entire Borexino experiment was terminated in October 2021.

== History and notable results ==
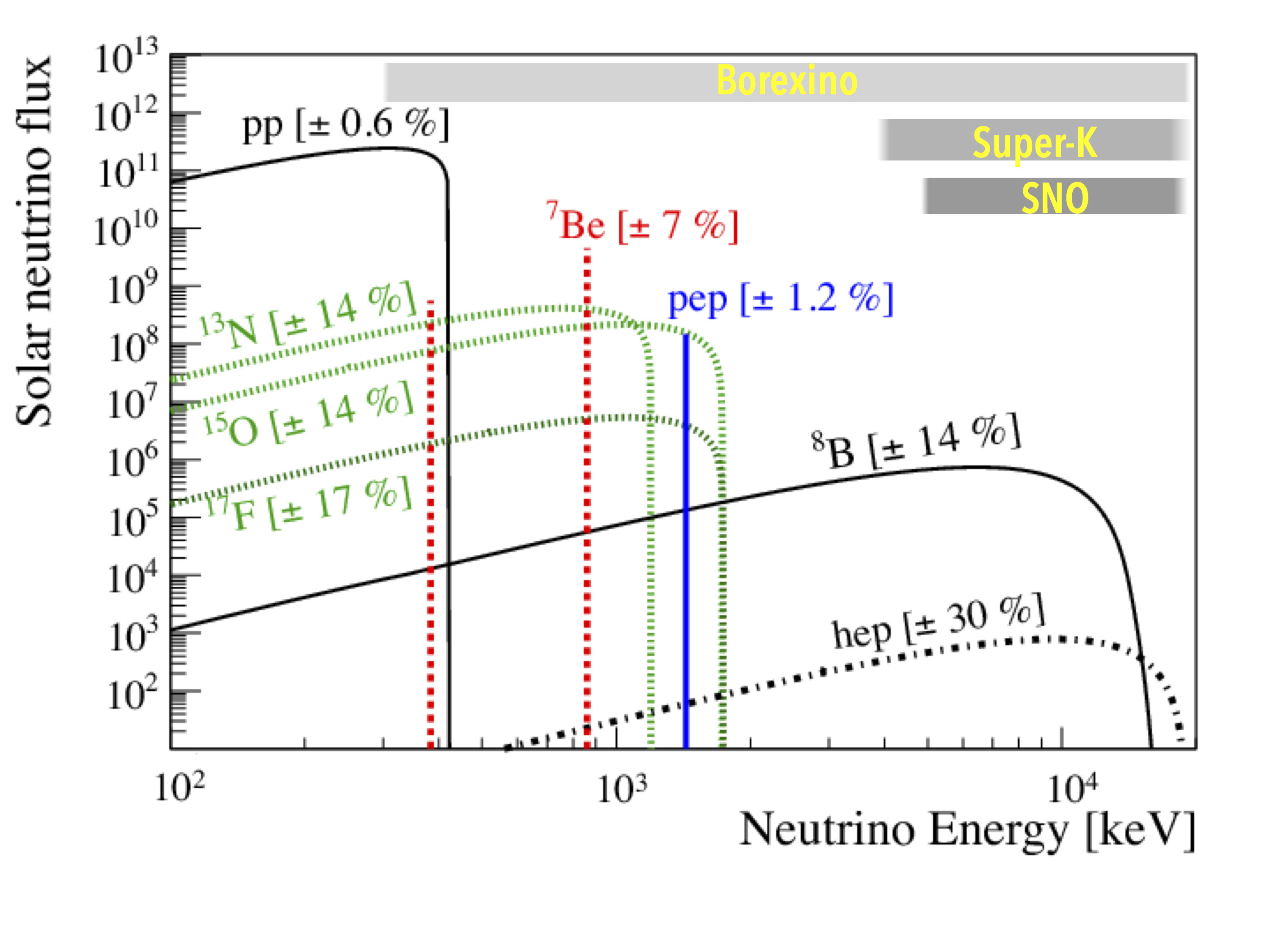
The gray bands compare the regions where the three solar neutrino telescopes (at the time), that were able to measure the energy of the events, were sensitive. Note that the predictions of solar models are in logarithmic scale: Super-Kamiokande and SNO could observe about 0.02% of the total, while Borexino could observe each type of predicted neutrino.

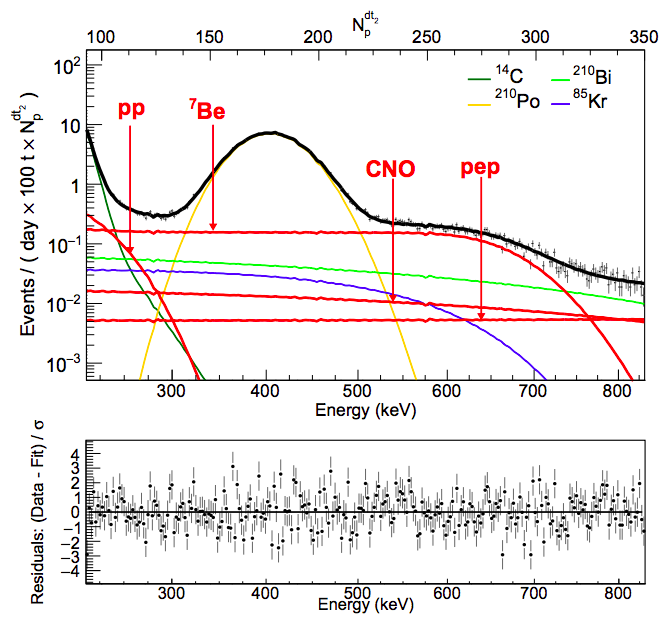
Spectrum of the Borexino data used for the simultaneous determination of the pp, pep and ^{7}Be solar ν fluxes, as well as the best available limit on CNO ν flux with weak constraints. Solar ν components are shown in red; background components in other colors. The lower plot shows the difference between the spectral shape of the data (black curve), and the expected shape when analytically adding together and fitting the signals corresponding to each species.

The initial BOREX proposal was made in 1986. In 1990, the design was fundamentally altered, and the name of the experiment was changed to "Borexino". Research and development began on the detector at that time. By 2004, the structure of the detector had been completed, and by May 2007 the detector chamber had been filled and data taking began.

The first results by the collaboration were published in August 2007 in: "First real time detection of ^{7}Be solar neutrinos by Borexino". The subject was further extended in 2008. In 2010, "geoneutrinos" from Earth's interior were observed for the first time using Borexino. These are anti-neutrinos produced in radioactive decays of uranium, thorium, potassium, and rubidium, although only the anti-neutrinos emitted in the ^{238}U/^{232}Th chains were visible because of the inverse beta decay reaction channel Borexino was sensitive to. That year, the lowest-threshold (3 MeV) measurement of the ^{8}B solar neutrino flux was also published. Additionally, a multi-source detector calibration campaign took place, where several radioactive sources were inserted in the detector to study its response to known signals which were close to the expected ones to be studied. In 2011, the experiment published a precision measurement of the beryllium-7 neutrino flux, as well as the first evidence for the pep solar neutrinos.

The results of measurements of the speed of CERN Neutrinos to Gran Sasso were published in 2012. These results were consistent with the speed of light, thus providing confirmation that the Faster-than-light Neutrino Anomaly reported earlier in the year was an erroneous measurement. An extensive scintillator purification campaign was also performed, achieving the successful goal of further reducing the residual background radioactivity levels to unprecedented low amounts (up to 15 orders of magnitude under natural background radioactivity levels).

In 2013, Borexino experiment added new limits on sterile neutrino parameters. They also extracted a signal of geoneutrinos, which gave insight into radioactive element activity in the Earth's crust, a hitherto unclear field.

An analysis of the proton–proton fusion activity in the Solar Core, published in 2014, found that solar activity has been consistently stable on a 10^{5}-year scale. Once the phenomenon of neutrino oscillations, as described by MSW theory, was considered, the measurement of Borexino was consistent with the expectations from the Standard Solar Model. This result provided significant data for understanding the functioning of the Sun. Previous experiments sensitive to low energy neutrinos (SAGE, Gallex, GNO) counted neutrinos above a certain energy, but did not measure individual fluxes.

In 2015, an updated spectral analysis of geoneutrinos was presented. Additionally, a Temperature Management and Monitoring System was installed in several phases throughout 2015, consisting of the multi-sensor Latitudinal Temperature Probe System (LTPS), whose testing and first-phase installation occurred in late 2014; and the Thermal Insulation System (TIS) that minimized the thermal influence of the exterior environment on the interior fluids through the extensive insulation of the experiment's external walls. Later in 2015, Borexino also yielded the best available limit to the lifetime of the electron (via e^{−}→γ+ν decay), providing the most stringent confirmation of charge conservation at the time.

=== Detecting solar neutrinos ===
The Sun is a large producer of neutrinos from a variety of different fusion mechanisms like pp and CNO being the two most dominant neutrino production mechanisms and these had extensive research done at Borexino. Due to the property of neutrinos to avoid interactions, it allows them to act as messenger particles, giving insight to the inner workings of nuclear fusion in the Sun's core. In order to detect these solar neutrinos, they must first interact with the free electrons within the liquid scintillator via electron-neutrino elastic scattering ($\upsilon_{e, \tau, \mu} + e \longrightarrow \upsilon'_{e, \tau, \mu} + e'$). Although the flux of incident neutrinos is high ($\approx 6\cdot 10^{10} cm^{-2}s^{-1}$), the cross section of interaction is significantly smaller which results in an interaction rate of only several dozen counts per day. Through this interaction, the neutrino deposits some of its energy to the electron, potentially exciting it. When the electron drops down to the ground state, it emits a photon and has some recoil with an associated recoil energy. The recoil of the energy of the electron is a spectrum with a maximum energy given by:
$$T_{e,max}=\frac{E_\upsilon}{1+\frac{m_e c^2}{2E_\upsilon}}$$

From conservation of energy, it is possible to resolve the energy of the incident neutrino to then distinguish between pp and CNO neutrinos by analyzing the resulting energy spectrum.

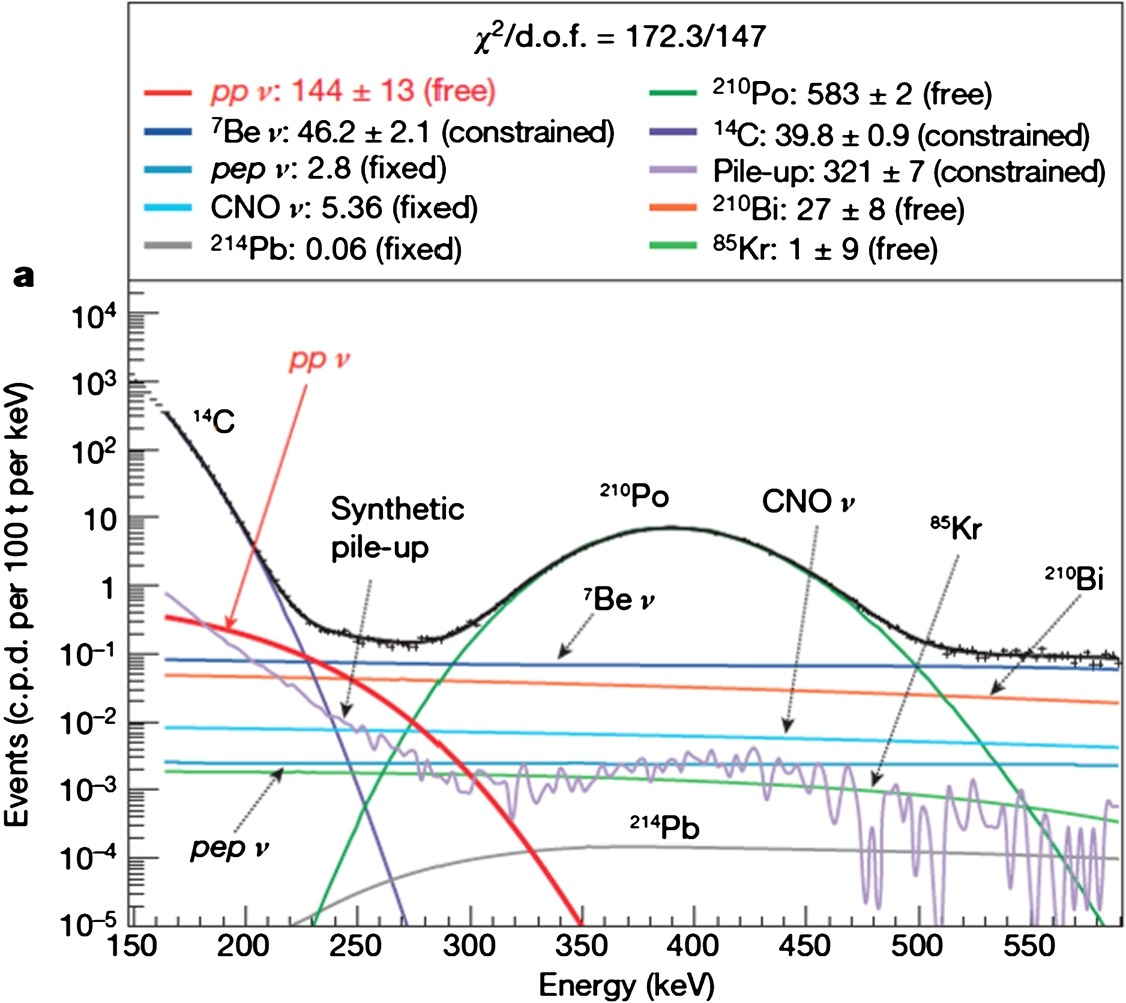
The energy and frequency spectrum of pp-chain neutrinos has a sharp drop off while the CNO neutrino spectrum is very broad.

==== pp neutrinos ====
The pp production process, in which hydrogen is fused into helium, is the primary source of energy production in the Sun (as well as other stars similar to the Sun that tend to be burn cooler and are smaller in size) as well as the dominant source of neutrinos, specifically electron neutrinos ($4p + 2e^-\longrightarrow {^4}He + 2\upsilon_e + Q$). The first direct detection of pp neutrinos was done by Borexino throughout the second phase of data collection, spanning from early 2012 to May 2013.

==== CNO neutrinos ====
Neutrinos originating from the CNO process are identified from the energy spectrum that is observed, characterized by a very broad energy distribution, ranging from 0 to 1740 keV as seen in the figure on the right. The detection of these particles directly gives insight into the metallicity of the Sun's core, as the CNO neutrino flux is dependent on the abundance of heavier elements (anything heavier than ^{4}He). It is also believed that CNO is the dominant fusion process in stars greater than $1.3M_{\odot}$. In order to confidently identify CNO neutrino counts, it is necessary to muffle the counts from ^{210}Bi (whose $\beta^{-}$decay closely resembles the energy spectrum of CNO neutrinos) by imposing a "muon-positron-neutron three-fold coincidence" condition.

In 2017, Borexino provided the first wideband spectroscopic measurement of the solar ν spectrum, featuring the simultaneous and most precise measurements available of the ^{7}Be, pep and pp neutrino fluxes, furthermore extracted from a single extended energy window (190-2930 keV). These measurements reached a precision of up to 2.7% (in the case of the beryllium solar neutrinos) and established a 5σ confirmation of the presence of pep neutrinos. The limit on the long sought-after CNO neutrinos was kept at the same significance level as in previous Borexino results, which held the best limit so far, but with weaker assumptions, making the result more robust. Much enlarged statistics thanks to the extra years of exposure, as well as renewed analysis techniques and MonteCarlo state-of-the-art simulations of the whole detector and its physical processes were instrumental in this result. Additionally, an updated observation of ^{8}B neutrinos was published with Phase I and II data (2008-2016), improving precision to around twice that of the previous measurement of this solar component, and hinting at a slight favoring of the high-metallicity SSMs with the available solar neutrino data. An improvement in the sensitivity to the seasonal modulation of the solar neutrino signal was also reported in 2017. That same year, the best direct-observation limit available for the neutrino magnetic moment was established by Borexino too. A neutrino signal related to the GW150914, GW151226 and GW170104 gravitational wave observations was rejected to within Borexino's sensitivity, as expected.

In 2020 Borexino detected the first deep solar core CNO neutrinos.

In 2021 the Borexino collaboration was awarded the Giuseppe and Vanna Cocconi Prize of the European Physical Society "for the ground-breaking observation of solar neutrinos from the pp chain and CNO cycle that provided unique and comprehensive tests of the Sun as a nuclear fusion engine."

=== Detecting geoneutrinos ===
It is also possible to study the interior composition of the Earth through detection of geoneutrinos produced by beta decays of radioactive elements present in the crust. Some elements of interest include ^{238}U, ^{232}Th and ^{40}K because of their abundance in rocks and their half-life is comparable to the life of a planet on the scale of billions of years, which leads to heating of the Earth's surface via radiogenic heating.

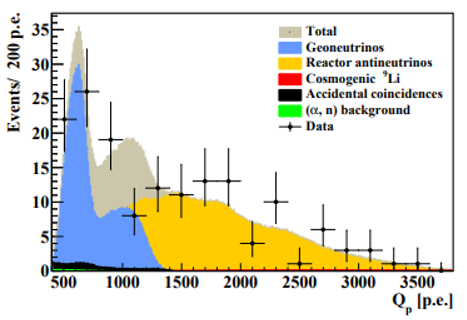
The spectrum of observed geoneutrinos along with accounted for background sources like muons of cosmic origin or neutrinos produced at nuclear power plants.

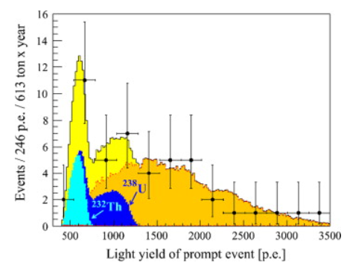
Number of neutrino events detected with special attention drawn to the blue peaks corresponding to the neutrinos originating from the beta decay of Thorium and Uranium.

When such elements emit antineutrino particles through beta minus decay, it interacts with atomic protons in the scintillator, which then produces a positron and a neutron ( ν̅_{e}+p→e^{+}+n). The positron eventually annihilates into two 0.511 MeV photons. The neutron, the other product from the antineutrino-proton reaction, gets captured by a proton via the neutron-capture process which releases a 2.22 MeV photon because of de-excitation. The PMT's were able to detect these flashes of light and in combination, these two signals appeared as a coincidence detection (from positron decay and neutron capture) with some delay between them, making it possible to discriminate against many background signals, such as muon interactions, yielding high resolution data. The Borexino collaboration stated that the main source of residual background came from electron neutrinos produced by European nuclear reactors.

As seen from the observed neutrino spectrum, the blue peaks represent those antineutrinos that come from the Earth's interior. It is seen that only two peaks appear which correspond to ^{238}U (second small peak) and ^{232}Th (first large peak) and there is no presence of antineutrinos that originate from the beta decay of ^{40}K. This is due to the energy threshold of the Borexino detector which was 1.806 MeV, being too high to trigger detection of those antineutrinos produced by the decay of ^{40}K at 1.32 MeV. From this graph, it is also possible to determine the abundances of each element present in the crust by simply extrapolating how many events occur at which energies. Based on the data in this case, it was possible to determine the flux of antineutrinos from ^{238}U and ^{232}Th as $\phi_\mathrm{U}=(2.1 \pm 1.5) \cdot10^6 \;\mathrm{cm^2 \;s^{-1}}$ and $\phi_\mathrm{Th}=(2.6 \pm 3.1) \cdot10^6 \;\mathrm{cm^2 \;s^{-1}}$ respectively.

== Other background discrimination techniques ==
To get a spectrum of the various sources of background neutrinos several precautions were taken in the experimental design and data analysis, in addition to utilizing coincidence detection techniques. Firstly, to reduce detection of background altogether, the nylon casing was intended to block background signals from the decay of ^{222}Rn and other products in its decay chain that were present in trace amounts within the experiment's materials left over from the production process. The outgassing of these radioactive isotopes, and their subsequent beta decay, would have triggered a false detection of a solar neutrino.

It was observed that temperature fluctuations from seasonal variability and human activity created convection inside the scintillator chamber, which ultimately changed the rate of outgassing of ^{210}Po in an unpredictable manner. To alleviate this, thermal insulation was wrapped around the detector in late 2015 to better maintain a steady internal temperature. Furthermore, in early 2016, a temperature control system was installed underneath the main housing in contact with the rock that would remain at cold temperatures. This would act as a heat sink, removing heat energy in and around the detector, further reducing temperature variability.

== SOX project ==
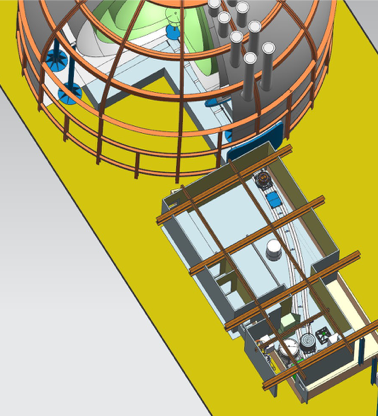
SOX antineutrino generator planned deployment along rail tracks: from its external dropoff point (lower right), through the calorimetry areas (lower right inside clean room), to its operational position (top center) in the small pit under Borexino

The SOX experiment aimed to resolve the neutrino anomalies, evidence of electron neutrino disappearances observed at LSND, MiniBooNE, with nuclear reactors and with solar neutrino Gallium detectors (GALLEX/GNO, SAGE). A statistically-significant signal would have meant the discovery of the first particles beyond the Standard Electroweak Model, and would have carried important implications in our understanding of the Universe and of fundamental particle physics. In case of a null result, it would have probed the existence of new physics in low energy neutrino interactions, provided a measurement of neutrino magnetic moment, Weinberg angle and other basic physical parameters; and would have yielded a high-quality energy calibration for Borexino, useful for future high-precision solar neutrino measurements.

SOX was envisioned to use a powerful (≈150 kCi) and innovative antineutrino generator made of Ce-144/Pr-144 and possibly a later Cr-51 neutrino generator, which would have required a much shorter data-taking campaign. These generators would have been located at short distance (8.5 m) from the Borexino detector - under it, in fact: in a pit built ex-profeso before the detector was erected, with the idea that it could be used for the insertion of such radioactive sources - and would have yielded tens of thousands of clean neutrino interactions in the internal volume of the Borexino detector. A high precision (<1% uncertainty) twin-calorimetry campaign would have been carried out before deployment in the pit, at the end of data-taking and possibly at some point during the experimental run, in order to provide an independent precise measurement of the source's activity, in order to accomplish a low-uncertainty rate analysis. Shape analyses for the source's antineutrino signal would have also been developed in order to increase the experiment's sensitivity, covering the whole high-significance "anomaly" phase space that was still left where light sterile neutrinos could lie in.

=== SOX cancelled ===
The experiment was expected to start in the first half of 2018 and take data for about two years. In October 2017, an end-to-end "blank" (without radioactive material) transport test was carried out successfully at the Borexino site in LNGS, in order to clear out final regulatory permissions for the start of the experiment, ahead of the arrival of the source. The cerium oxide (ceria, or CeO_{2}) source for CeSOX's antineutrino generator had to be manufactured by Mayak PA, but technical problems during the fabrication were disclosed in late 2017. These problems meant the generator would not be able to provide the necessary amount of antineutrinos, by a factor of 3, and prompted a review of the project and its eventual starting date. By early February 2018, the CeSOX project was officially cancelled by CEA and INFN due to the radioactive source production problem, and Borexino's 2018-19 goals were reoriented toward achieving higher detector stability and, with it, increased radiopurity, in order to push for higher precision solar neutrino results, with special emphasis on CNO neutrinos.
