= Inverse beta decay =

Nuclear reaction between an electron antineutrino and proton

In nuclear and particle physics, inverse beta decay, commonly abbreviated to IBD, is a nuclear reaction involving an electron antineutrino scattering off a proton, creating a positron and a neutron. This process is commonly used in the detection of electron antineutrinos in neutrino detectors, such as the first detection of antineutrinos in the Cowan–Reines neutrino experiment, or in neutrino experiments such as KamLAND and Borexino. It is an essential process to experiments involving low-energy neutrinos (< 60 MeV) such as those studying neutrino oscillation, reactor neutrinos, sterile neutrinos, and geoneutrinos.

== Reactions ==
=== Antineutrino induced ===
Inverse beta decay proceeds as

ν̅_{e} + p → e^{+} + n,

where an electron antineutrino (ν̅_{e}) interacts with a proton (p) to produce a positron (e^{+}) and a neutron (n). The IBD reaction can only be initiated when the antineutrino possesses at least 1.806 MeV of kinetic energy (called the threshold energy). This threshold energy is due to a difference in mass between the products (e^{+} and n) and the reactants (ν̅_{e} and p) and also slightly due to a relativistic mass effect on the antineutrino. Most of the antineutrino energy is distributed to the positron due to its small mass relative to the neutron. The positron promptly undergoes matter–antimatter annihilation after creation and yields a flash of light with energy calculated as

$$\begin{align}
E_\text{vis} &= 511 \text{ keV} + 511 \text{ keV} + E_{\rm \,\overline\nu_e} - 1806 \text{ keV} \\[2pt]
&= E_{\rm \,\overline\nu_e} - 784 \text{ keV}
\end{align}$$

where 511 keV is the electron and positron rest energy, E_{vis} is the visible energy from the reaction, and $E_{\rm \,\overline\nu_e}$ is the antineutrino kinetic energy. After the prompt positron annihilation, the neutron undergoes neutron capture on an element in the detector, producing a delayed flash of 2.22 MeV if captured on a proton. The timing of the delayed capture is 200–300 microseconds after IBD initiation (≈256 μs in the Borexino detector). The timing and spatial coincidence between the prompt positron annihilation and delayed neutron capture provides a clear IBD signature in neutrino detectors, allowing for discrimination from background. The IBD cross section is dependent on antineutrino energy and capturing element, although is generally on the order of 10^{−44} cm^{2} (~ attobarns).

=== Neutrino induced ===
Another kind of inverse beta decay is the reaction

ν_{e} + n → e^{−} + p

The Homestake experiment used the reaction

$$\mathrm{\nu_e + \ ^{37}Cl \longrightarrow \ ^{37}Ar + e^-}$$

to detect solar neutrinos.

=== Electron induced ===
During the formation of neutron stars, or in radioactive isotopes capable of electron capture, neutrons are created by electron capture:

p + e^{−} → n + ν_{e}.

This is similar to the inverse beta reaction in that a proton is changed to a neutron, but is induced by the capture of an electron instead of an antineutrino.

== See also ==
- Kamioka Liquid Scintillator Antineutrino Detector
