= Radio Neutrino Observatory Greenland =

Observatory in Greenland

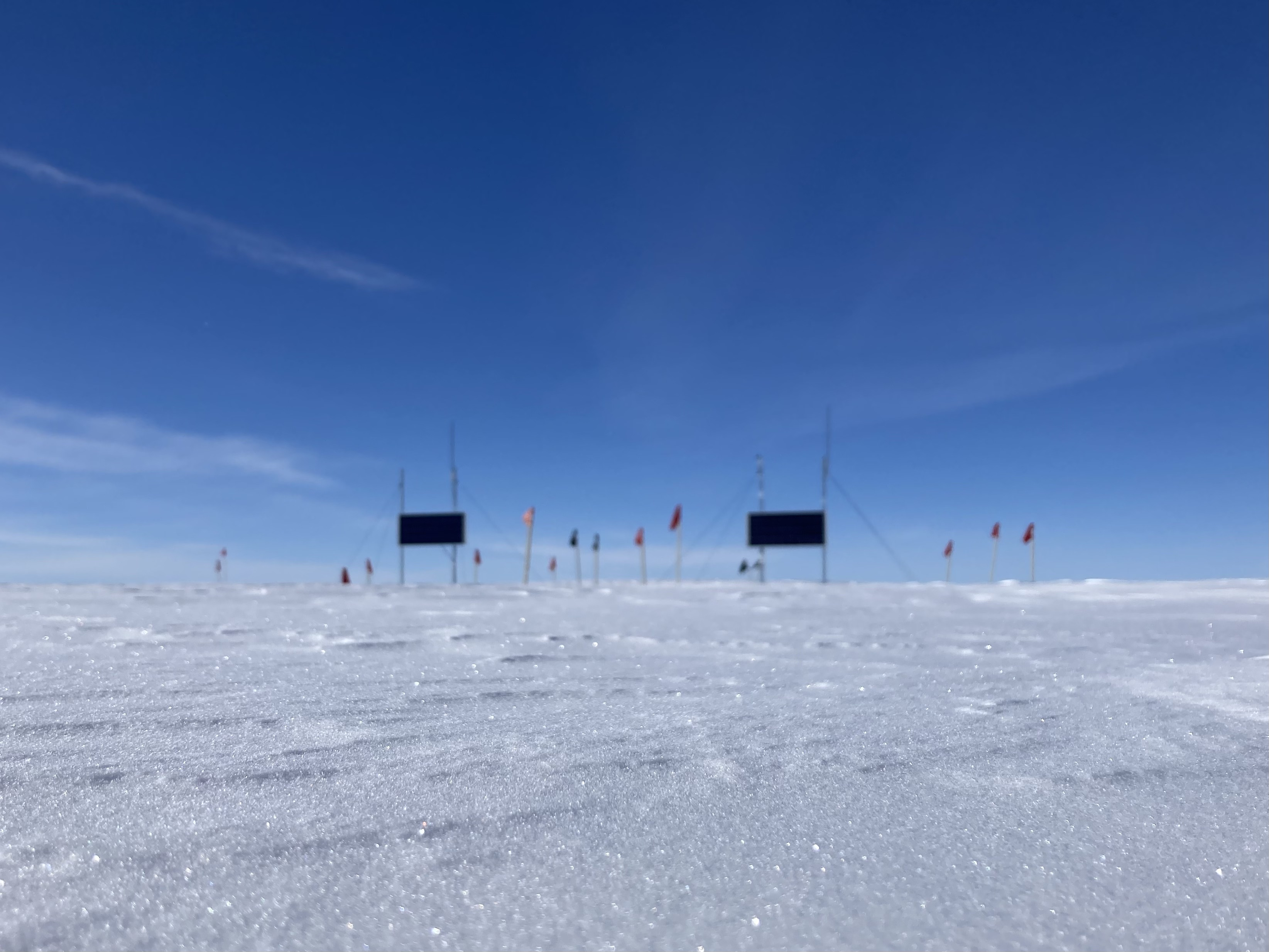
- Picture of a RNO-G station with solar panels

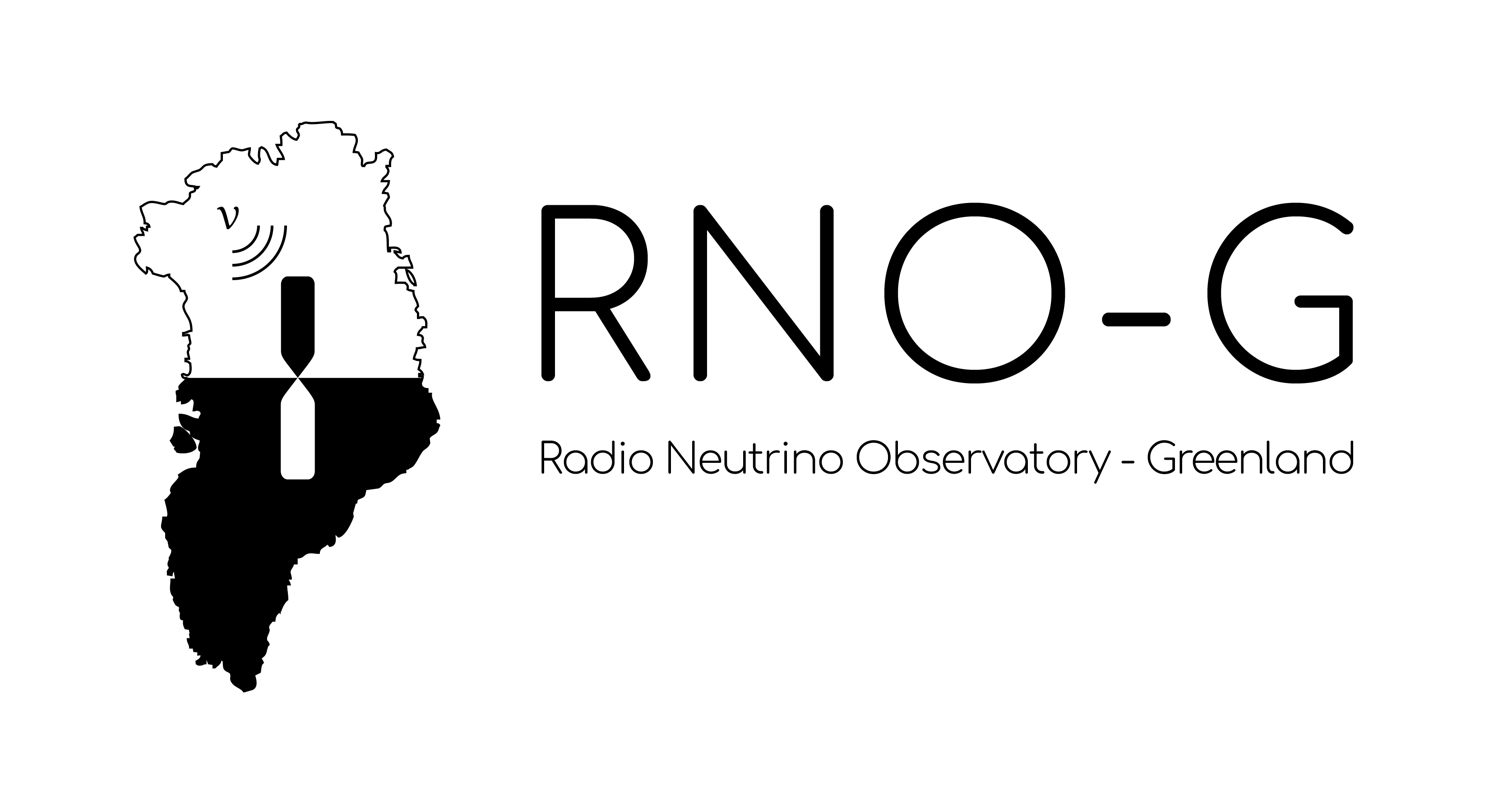
- Organization: RNO-G Collaboration
- Location: Summit Camp
- Coordinates: 72°34′44.10″N 38°27′34.56″W
- Altitude: 3,216 metres (10,551 ft)
- Established: 2021
- Website: radio.uchicago.edu/index.php

Telescopes
- Radio Antennas: Neutrinos and Cosmic Rays RNO-G location in Greenland
- Related media on Commons

The Radio Neutrino Observatory Greenland (or RNO-G) is a neutrino observatory deployed near Summit Camp on top of the Greenland ice sheet.

The goal of the RNO-G experiment is detecting ultra-high energy neutrinos and estimating their flux. These particles could help to better understand the most violent events in the universe, including but not limited to active galactic nuclei (AGN) and gamma ray bursts (GRB). A neutrino detection by RNO-G would also extend the energy range at which neutrinos can be used for multi-messenger astronomy.

== Detector layout ==
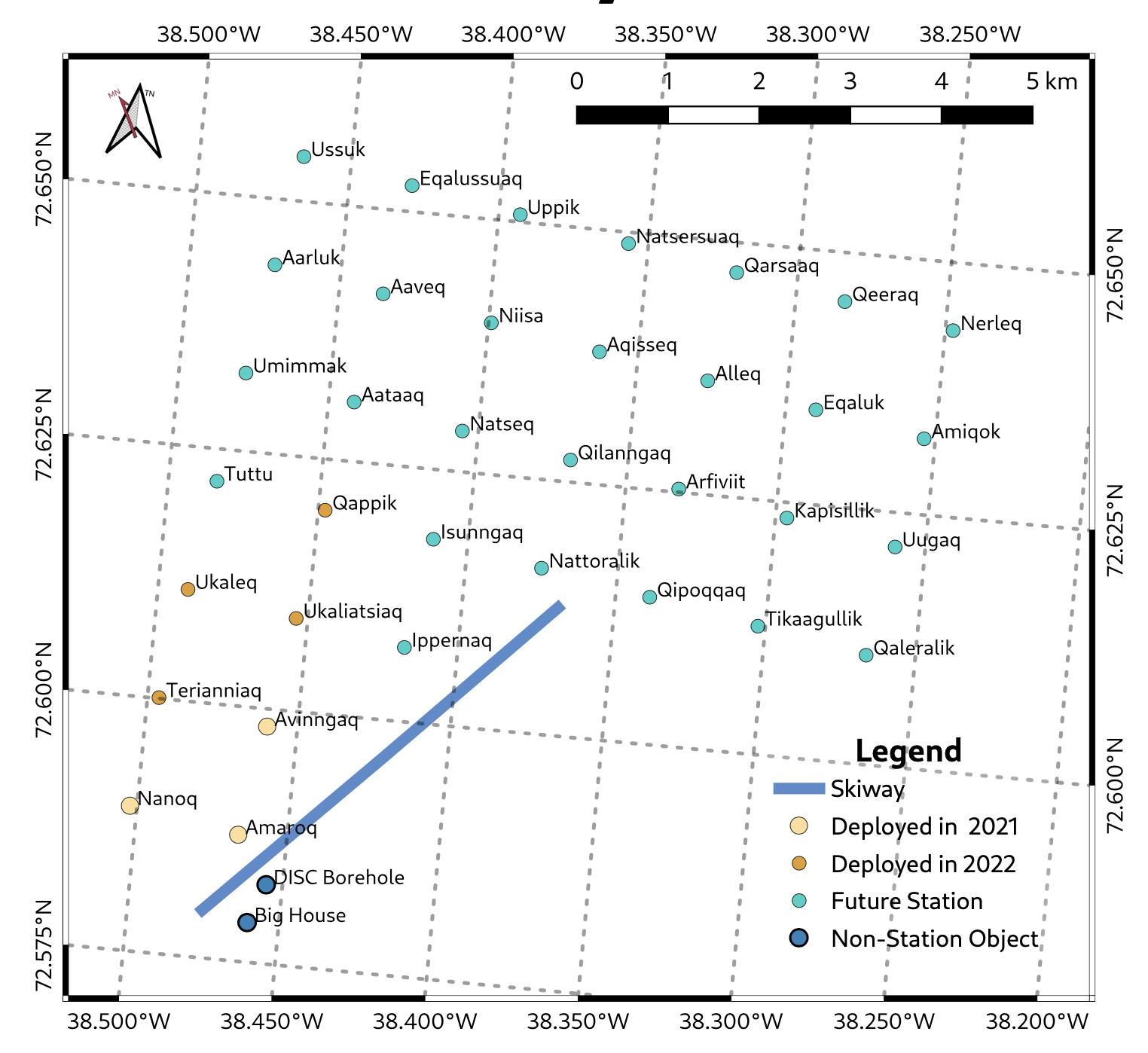
Array in 2022

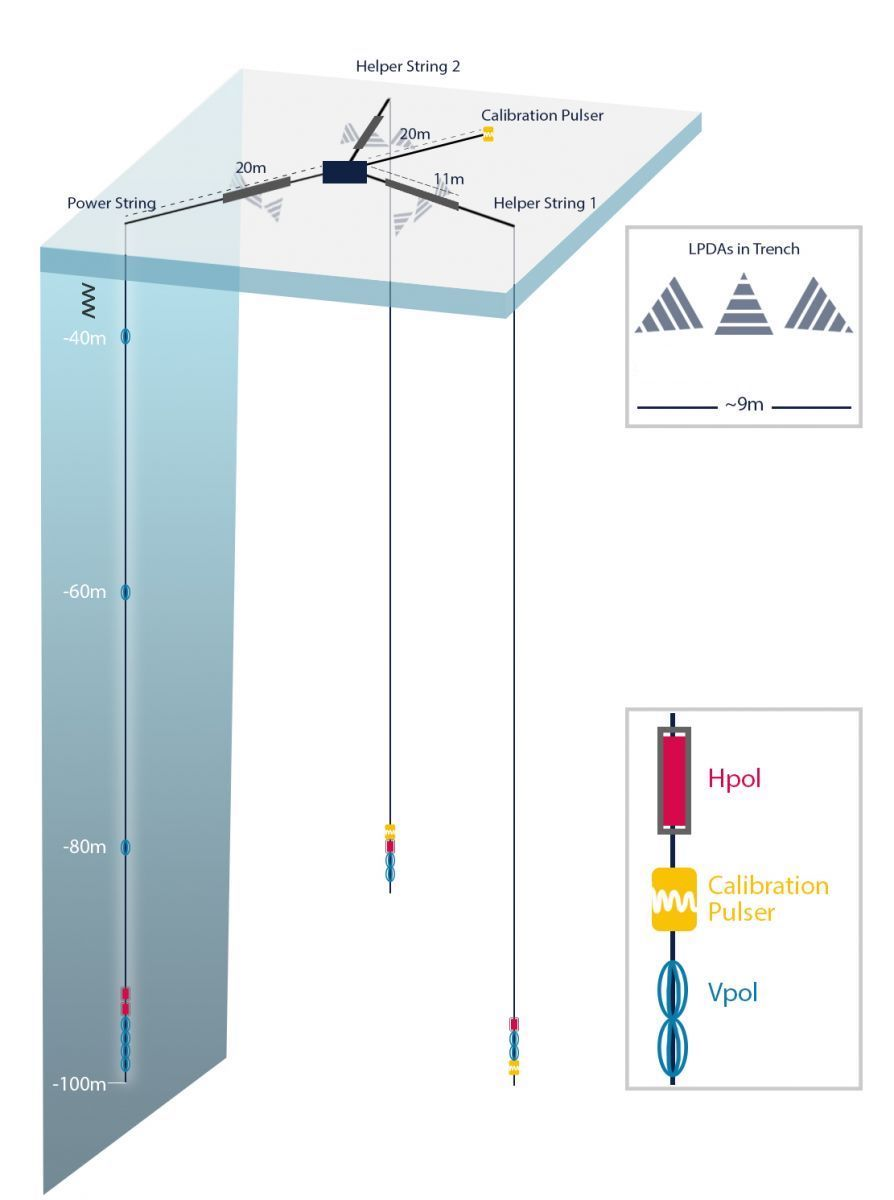
Sketch of a RNO-G station

Located at 3,216 metres (10,551 ft) above sea level, the detector array is planned to consist of 35 stations. By 2022 seven stations have been deployed and are taking data. Each station consists of three in-ice strings at 100m depth to measure particle cascades in ice induced by neutrinos and other particles and a surface component that is also sensitive to cosmic rays. The stations operate autonomous and are powered by renewable energies, such as solar panels and wind turbines. The communication is wireless via LTE.

== Detection principle ==
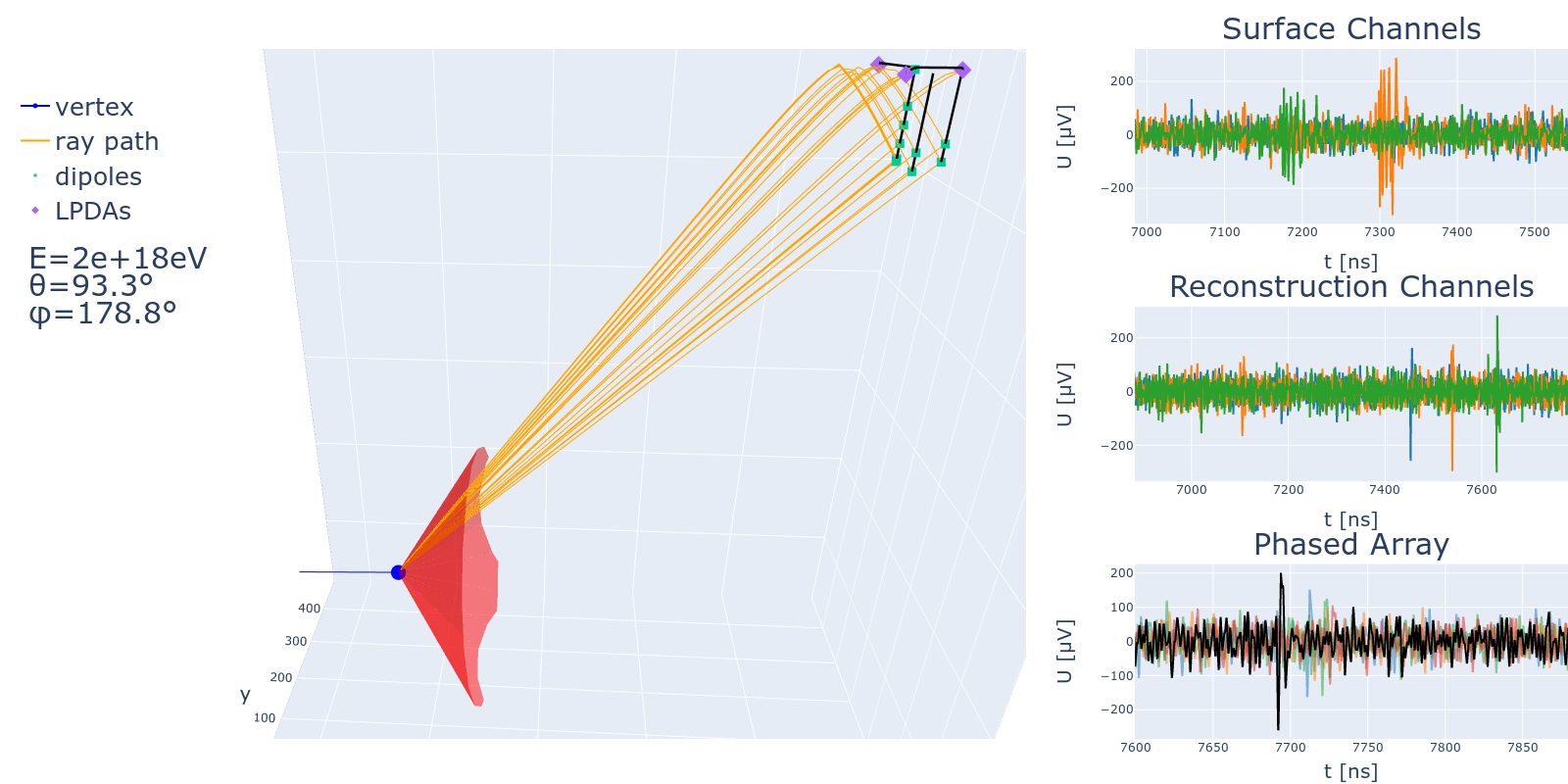
Simulation of a Neutrino Event

An event view from simulations for RNO-G. The neutrino induced particle cascade creates radio emission via the Askaryan effect. This is strongest at the Cherenkov angle at 56°, here shown as a red cone. The radio signal will propagate to the detector according to the ice density (direct and reflected). On the right shown are signals in the surface antennas (upper panel), the reconstruction antennas (middle) and the phased array trigger (lower panel).

== See also ==
Other radio neutrino experiments:

- Radio Ice Cherenkov Experiment (RICE)
- Askaryan Radio Array (ARA)
- Antarctic Ross Ice-Shelf Antenna Neutrino Array (ARIANNA)
- Antarctic Impulsive Transient Antenna (ANITA)
