= Abigail Vieregg =

Professor of physics

- Other name: Abby Vieregg
- Education: Dartmouth College, B.A. 2004; University of California, Los Angeles, Ph.D., 2010
- Awards: Presidential Early Career Awards for Scientists and Engineers, 2019
- Scientific career
- Fields: physics, cosmology, neutrino astrophysics
- Workplaces: Harvard-Smithsonian Center for Astrophysics, 2010 — 2013; University of Chicago, 2014 – present
- Thesis: The Search for Astrophysical Ultra-High Energy Neutrinos Using Radio Detection Techniques (2010)
- Website: https://kicp.uchicago.edu/~avieregg/ https://physics.uchicago.edu/people/profile/abigail-vieregg/

Abigail Goodhue Vieregg is a professor of physics at the Enrico Fermi Institute and Kavli Institute of Cosmology, University of Chicago, specializing in neutrino astrophysics and cosmology. Her work focuses on cosmic high-energy neutrinos and mapping the cosmic microwave background.

== Education ==
Vieregg received a B.A. in physics from Dartmouth College in 2004, and a Ph.D. in physics from the University of California, Los Angeles, in 2010. Her Ph.D. dissertation, The Search for Astrophysical Ultra-High Energy Neutrinos Using Radio Detection Techniques, focused on the detection of subatomic particles called neutrinos through radio pulses that arise from the neutrinos' interactions with matter. In it, she analyzes data from ANITA-II, the second flight of the ANITA experiment, a balloon-based study of ultrahigh-energy neutrinos interacting in the Antarctic ice, and set the strongest parameter limits to date for cosmic neutrinos with energies between 10^{18} and 10^{21} electronvolts.

== Professional career ==
From 2010 to 2013, Vieregg was a postdoctoral fellow of the National Science Foundation's Office of Polar Programs, at the Harvard-Smithsonian Center for Astrophysics, where she continued research on the ANITA experiment, and also worked on the Keck Array polarimeter. In 2014, Vieregg joined the University of Chicago faculty as assistant professor, and was promoted to associate professor in 2019.

== Research ==
Vieregg studies ultrahigh-energy neutrinos — neutrinos with energies of more than 10^{18} electronvolts — that originate from beyond the Milky Way galaxy, shedding light on the nature of neutrinos and helping to home in on extragalactic sources of the particle. Vieregg is involved in a number of cosmic-neutrino experiments, including the balloon-borne ANITA experiment and the Askaryan Radio Array experiment, which uses detectors buried in the Antarctic ice to search for signals resulting from the interaction of cosmic high-energy neutrinos. She is the principal investigator for the proposed Payload for Ultrahigh Energy Observation (PUEO) experiment, another Antarctic, long-duration balloon mission that would be 10 times more sensitive than ANITA, and the Radio Neutrino Observatory (RNO) in Greenland—a ground-based neutrino search that builds on the Askaryan Radio Array experiment.

Vieregg's research also focuses on mapping the cosmic microwave background, or CMB, the relic light from the early moments of the universe, to illuminate the universe's early history. She is involved with the South-Pole based Keck Array and BICEP3 experiments, which measure CMB polarization. She is the technical coordinator and an executive member of CMB-S4, which will use 21 telescopes at the South Pole and the Chilean Atacama Cosmology Telescope to survey the microwave sky.

Vieregg was awarded the Presidential Early Career Award in 2019.

== Awards ==
- Nancy Grace Roman Technology Fellowships in Astrophysics for Early Career Researchers, NASA, 2016
- Alfred P. Sloan Research Fellowship, 2017
- Shakti P. Duggal Award, 2017
- Cottrell Scholar Award, 2018
- Presidential Early Career Award, 2019
- Fellow of the American Physical Society, 2025
