= Neutrino detector =

Physics apparatus designed to study neutrinos

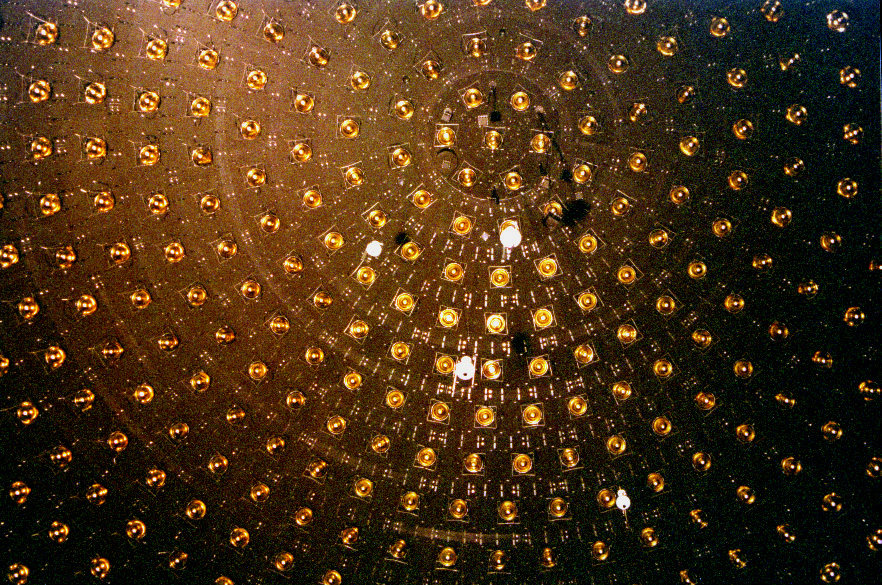
The inside of the MiniBooNE neutrino detector

A neutrino detector is a physics apparatus which is designed to study neutrinos. Because neutrinos only weakly interact with other particles of matter, neutrino detectors must be very large to detect a significant number of neutrinos. Neutrino detectors are often built underground, to isolate the detector from cosmic rays and other background radiation. The field of neutrino astronomy is still very much in its infancy – the only confirmed extraterrestrial sources as of 2018 are the Sun and the supernova 1987A in the nearby Large Magellanic Cloud. Another likely source (three standard deviations) is the blazar TXS 0506+056 about 3.7 billion light years away. Neutrino observatories will "give astronomers fresh eyes with which to study the universe".

Various detection methods have been used. Super Kamiokande is a large volume of water surrounded by phototubes that watch for the Cherenkov radiation emitted when an incoming neutrino creates an electron or muon in the water. The Sudbury Neutrino Observatory was similar, but used heavy water as the detecting medium. Other detectors have consisted of large volumes of chlorine or gallium which are periodically checked for excesses of argon or germanium, respectively, which are created by neutrinos interacting with the original substance. MINOS used a solid plastic scintillator watched by phototubes; Borexino uses a liquid pseudocumene scintillator also watched by phototubes; and the NOνA detector uses a liquid scintillator watched by avalanche photodiodes.

The proposed acoustic detection of neutrinos via the thermoacoustic effect is the subject of dedicated studies done by the ANTARES, IceCube, and KM3NeT collaborations.

== Theory ==
Neutrinos are omnipresent in nature: every second, tens of billions of them "pass through every square [sic] centimetre of our bodies without us ever noticing." (Note: ... they are nevertheless almost undetectable: In just one second several tens of billions of neutrinos pass through every square centimetre of our bodies without us ever noticing. ... No magnetic field diverts them from their course, shooting straight ahead at almost the speed of light. ... Almost nothing stops them. ... Neutrinos are remarkably tricky customers. There are three types or flavours: electron, muon, and tau neutrinos, named after three other particles to which they give rise when they collide with an atom.) Many were created during the Big Bang, and others are generated by nuclear reactions inside stars, planets, and by other interstellar processes. According to scientists' speculations, some may also originate from events in the universe such as "colliding black holes, gamma ray bursts from exploding stars, and/or violent events at the cores of distant galaxies". (Note: Sensors in the ice have detected the rare and fleeting flashes of light caused when neutrinos interact with the ice. ... Amanda 2 (Second Antarctic Muon and Neutrino Detector Array) is designed to look not up, but down, through the Earth to the sky of the Northern Hemisphere.)

Despite how common they are, neutrinos are extremely difficult to detect, due to their low mass and lack of electric charge. Unlike other particles, neutrinos only interact via gravity and the weak interaction. The two types of weak interactions they (rarely) engage in are neutral current (which involves the exchange of a Z boson and only results in deflection) and charged current (which involves the exchange of a W boson and causes the neutrino to convert into a charged lepton: an electron, a muon, or a tauon, or one of their antiparticles, if an antineutrino). According to the laws of physics neutrinos must have mass, but only a "smidgen of rest mass" – perhaps less than a "millionth as much as an electron" – so the gravitational force caused by neutrinos has so far proved too weak to detect, leaving the weak interaction as the main method of detection:

Neutral current
In a neutral current interaction, the neutrino enters and then leaves the detector after having transferred some of its energy and momentum to a 'target' particle. If the target particle is charged and sufficiently lightweight (e.g. an electron), it might be accelerated to a relativistic speed and consequently emit Cherenkov radiation, which can be observed directly. All three neutrino flavors, or flavours (electronic, muonic, and tauonic) can participate, regardless of the neutrino energy. However, no neutrino flavor information is left behind.
Charged current
In a charged current interaction, a high-energy neutrino transforms into its partner lepton (electron, muon, or tauon). However, if the neutrino does not have sufficient energy to create its heavier partner's mass, the charged current interaction is effectively unavailable to it. Neutrinos from the Sun and from nuclear reactors have enough energy to create electrons. Most accelerator-created neutrino beams can also create muons, and a very few can create tauons. A detector which can distinguish among these leptons can reveal the flavor of the neutrino incident to a charged current interaction; because the interaction involves the exchange of a W boson, the 'target' particle also changes (e.g., neutron → proton).

== Detection techniques ==
=== Scintillators ===
Antineutrinos were first detected near the Savannah River nuclear reactor by the Cowan–Reines neutrino experiment in 1956. Frederick Reines and Clyde Cowan used two targets containing a solution of cadmium chloride in water. Two scintillation detectors were placed next to the water targets. Antineutrinos with an energy above the threshold of 1.8 MeV caused charged current "Inverse beta decay" interactions with the protons in the water, producing positrons and neutrons. The resulting positrons annihilate with electrons, creating pairs of coincident photons with an energy of about 0.5 MeV each, which could be detected by the two scintillation detectors above and below the target. The neutrons were captured by cadmium nuclei, resulting in delayed gamma rays of about 8 MeV that were detected a few microseconds after the photons from a positron annihilation event.

This experiment was designed by Cowan and Reines to give a unique signature for antineutrinos, to prove the existence of these particles. It was not the experimental goal to measure the total antineutrino flux. The detected antineutrinos thus all carried an energy greater than 1.8 MeV, which is the threshold for the reaction channel used (1.8 MeV is the energy needed to create a positron and a neutron from a proton). Only about 3% of the antineutrinos from a nuclear reactor carry enough energy for the reaction to occur.

A more recently built and much larger KamLAND detector used similar techniques to study oscillations of antineutrinos from 53 Japanese nuclear power plants. A smaller, but more radiopure Borexino detector was able to measure the most important components of the neutrino spectrum from the Sun, as well as antineutrinos from Earth and nuclear reactors.

The SNO+ experiment uses linear alkylbenzene as a liquid scintillator, in contrast to its predecessor Sudbury Neutrino Observatory which used heavy water and detected Cherenkov light (see below).

=== Radiochemical methods ===
Chlorine detectors, based on the method suggested by Bruno Pontecorvo, consist of a tank filled with a chlorine-containing fluid such as tetrachloroethylene. A neutrino occasionally converts a chlorine-37 atom into one of argon-37 via the charged current interaction. The threshold neutrino energy for this reaction is 0.814 MeV. The fluid is periodically purged with helium gas which would remove the argon. The helium is then cooled to separate out the argon, and the argon atoms are counted based on their electron capture radioactive decays. A chlorine detector in the former Homestake Mine near Lead, South Dakota, containing 520 short tons (470 metric tons) of fluid, was the first to detect the solar neutrinos, and made the first measurement of the deficit of electron neutrinos from the sun (see Solar neutrino problem).

A similar detector design, with a much lower detection threshold of 0.233 MeV, uses a gallium (Ga) → germanium (Ge) transformation which is sensitive to lower-energy neutrinos. A neutrino is able to react with an atom of gallium-71, converting it into an atom of the unstable isotope germanium-71. The germanium was then chemically extracted and concentrated. Neutrinos were thus detected by measuring the radioactive decay of germanium.

This latter method is nicknamed the "Alsace-Lorraine" technique in a joke-reference to the Ga → Ge → Ga reaction sequence. (Note: The nickname of the technique comes from the reaction sequence gallium → germanium → gallium. Gallium is named after France, and germanium is named after Germany, so the analogue is France → Germany → France. The Alsace-Lorraine territory sits on the two countries' common border, and historically possession of the region has alternated between France and Germany; thus the joke in the technique's nickname.)

The SAGE experiment in Russia used about 50 tons of gallium, and the GALLEX / GNO experiments in Italy about 30 tons of gallium as reaction mass. The price of gallium is prohibitive, so this experiment is difficult to afford on large-scale. Larger experiments have therefore turned to a less costly reaction mass.

Radiochemical detection methods are only useful for counting neutrinos; they provide almost no information on neutrino energy or direction of travel.

=== Cherenkov detectors ===
"Ring-imaging" Cherenkov detectors take advantage of a phenomenon called Cherenkov light. Cherenkov radiation is produced whenever charged particles such as electrons or muons are moving through a given detector medium somewhat faster than the speed of light in that medium. In a Cherenkov detector, a large volume of clear material such as water or ice is surrounded by light-sensitive photomultiplier tubes. A charged lepton produced with sufficient energy and moving through such a detector does travel somewhat faster than the speed of light in the detector medium (although somewhat slower than the speed of light in vacuum). The charged lepton generates a visible "optical shockwave" of Cherenkov radiation. This radiation is detected by the photomultiplier tubes and shows up as a characteristic ring-like pattern of activity in the array of photomultiplier tubes. As neutrinos can interact with atomic nuclei to produce charged leptons which emit Cherenkov radiation, this pattern can be used to infer direction, energy, and (sometimes) flavor information about incident neutrinos.

Two water-filled detectors of this type (Kamiokande and IMB) recorded a neutrino burst from supernova SN 1987A. (Note: Neutrino astronomy was given a strong push in 1987 when a supernova in a galaxy only one-quarter of a million light-years away from Earth flared into view – the closest supernova in 400 years.) Scientists detected 19 neutrinos from an explosion of a star inside the Large Magellanic Cloud – only 19 out of the octo-decillion (10^{57}) neutrinos emitted by the supernova. (Note: In 1987, astronomers counted 19 neutrinos from an explosion of a star in the nearby Large Magellanic Cloud, 19 out of the billion trillion trillion trillion trillion neutrinos that flew from the supernova.) The Kamiokande detector was able to detect the burst of neutrinos associated with this supernova, and in 1988 it was used to directly confirm the production of solar neutrinos. The largest such detector is the water-filled Super-Kamiokande. This detector uses 50,000 tons of pure water surrounded by 11,000 photomultiplier tubes buried 1 km underground.

The Sudbury Neutrino Observatory (SNO) used 1,000 tonnes of ultrapure heavy water contained in a 12 metre-diameter vessel made of acrylic plastic surrounded by a cylinder of ultrapure ordinary water 22 metres in diameter and 34 metres high. (Note: New evidence confirms last year's indication that one type of neutrino emerging from the Sun's core does switch to another type en route to the Earth. ... The data were obtained from the underground Sudbury Neutrino Observatory (SNO) in Canada. ... Neutrinos are ghostly particles with no electric charge and very little mass. They are known to exist in three types related to three different charged particles - the electron and its lesser-known relatives, the muon and the tau. ...) In addition to the neutrino interactions visible in a regular water detector, a neutrino can break up the deuterium in heavy water. The resulting free neutron is subsequently captured, releasing a burst of gamma rays that can be detected. All three neutrino flavors participate equally in this dissociation reaction.

The MiniBooNE detector employs pure mineral oil as its detection medium. Mineral oil is a natural scintillator, so charged particles without sufficient energy to produce Cherenkov light still produce scintillation light. Low-energy muons and protons, invisible in water, can be detected. Thus the use of natural environment as a measurement medium emerged.

Since the neutrino flux incoming to earth decreases with increasing energy, the size of neutrino detectors must increase too. Though building a kilometer-sized cube detector underground covered by thousands of photomultiplier would be prohibitively expensive, detection volumes of this magnitude can be achieved by installing Cherenkov detector arrays deep inside already existing natural water or ice formations, with several other advantages. Firstly, hundreds of meters of water or ice partly protect the detector from atmospheric muons. Secondly, these environments are transparent and dark, vital criteria in order to detect the faint Cherenkov light. In practice, because of Potassium 40 decay, even the abyss is not completely dark, so this decay must be used as a baseline.

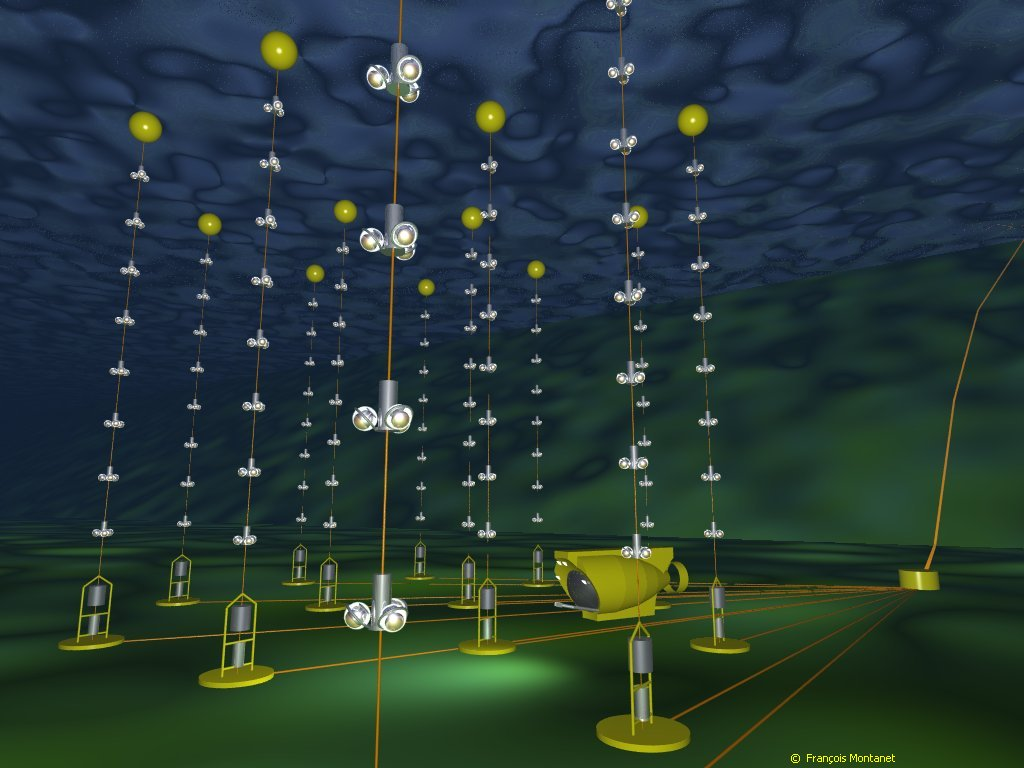
An illustration of the Antares neutrino detector deployed under water.

Located at a depth of about 2.5 km in the Mediterranean Sea, the ANTARES telescope (Astronomy with a Neutrino Telescope and Abyss environmental Research) has been fully operational since 30 May 2008. Consisting of an array of twelve separate 350 meter-long vertical detector strings 70 meters apart, each with 75 photomultiplier optical modules, this detector uses the surrounding sea water as the detector medium. The next generation deep sea neutrino telescope KM3NeT will have a total instrumented volume of about 5 km^{3}. The detector will be distributed over three installation sites in the Mediterranean. Implementation of the first phase of the telescope was started in 2013.

The Antarctic Muon And Neutrino Detector Array (AMANDA) operated from 1996–2004. This detector used photomultiplier tubes mounted in strings buried deep (1.5–2 km) inside Antarctic glacial ice near the South Pole. The ice itself is the detector medium. The direction of incident neutrinos is determined by recording the arrival time of individual photons using a three-dimensional array of detector modules each containing one photomultiplier tube. This method allows detection of neutrinos above 50 GeV with a spatial resolution of approximately 2 degrees. AMANDA was used to generate neutrino maps of the northern sky to search for extraterrestrial neutrino sources and to search for dark matter. AMANDA has been upgraded to the IceCube observatory, eventually increasing the volume of the detector array to one cubic kilometer. Ice Cube sits deep underneath the South Pole in a cubic kilometre of perfectly clear, bubble-free ancient ice. Like AMANDA it relies on detecting the flickers of light emitted on the exceedingly rare occasions when a neutrino does interact with an atom of ice or water.

=== Radio detectors ===
The Radio Ice Cherenkov Experiment uses antennas to detect Cherenkov radiation from high-energy neutrinos in Antarctica. The Antarctic Impulse Transient Antenna (ANITA) is a balloon-borne device flying over Antarctica and detecting Askaryan radiation, produced as cosmic ultra-high-energy neutrinos travel through the ice below and produce a shower of secondary charged particles, which emits a cone of coherent radiation in the radio or microwave part of the electromagnetic spectrum. Currently the Radio Neutrino Observatory Greenland is being built, exploiting the Askaryan effect in ice to detect neutrinos with energies >10 PeV.

=== Tracking calorimeters ===
Tracking calorimeters such as the MINOS detectors use alternating planes of absorber material and detector material. The absorber planes provide detector mass while the detector planes provide the tracking information. Steel is a popular absorber choice, being relatively dense and inexpensive and having the advantage that it can be magnetised. The active detector is often liquid or plastic scintillator, read out with photomultiplier tubes, although various kinds of ionisation chambers have also been used.

The NOνA proposal suggests eliminating the absorber planes in favor of using a very large active detector volume.

Tracking calorimeters are only useful for high-energy (GeV range) neutrinos. At these energies, neutral current interactions appear as a shower of hadronic debris and charged current interactions are identified by the presence of the charged lepton's track (possibly alongside some form of hadronic debris).

A muon produced in a charged current interaction leaves a long penetrating track and is easy to spot; The length of this muon track and its curvature in the magnetic field provide energy and charge (μ^{−} versus μ^{+}) information. An electron in the detector produces an electromagnetic shower, which can be distinguished from hadronic showers if the granularity of the active detector is small compared to the physical extent of the shower. Tau leptons decay essentially immediately to either another charged lepton or pions, and cannot be observed directly in this kind of detector. (To directly observe taus, one typically looks for a kink in tracks in photographic emulsion.)

=== Coherent Recoil Detector ===
At low energies, a neutrino can scatter from the entire nucleus of an atom, rather than the individual nucleons, in a process known as coherent neutral current neutrino-nucleus elastic scattering or coherent neutrino scattering. This effect has been used to make an extremely small neutrino detector. Unlike most other detection methods, coherent scattering does not depend on the flavor of the neutrino.

== Background suppression ==
Most neutrino experiments must address the flux of cosmic rays that bombard the Earth's surface.

The higher-energy (>50 MeV or so) neutrino experiments often cover or surround the primary detector with a "veto" detector which reveals when a cosmic ray passes into the primary detector, allowing the corresponding activity in the primary detector to be ignored ("vetoed"). Since the atmospheric muon incident flux is isotropic, a localised and anisotropic detection is discriminated in relation to the background betraying a cosmic event.

For lower-energy experiments, the cosmic rays are not directly the problem. Instead, the spallation neutrons and radioisotopes produced by the cosmic rays may mimic the desired signals. For these experiments, the solution is to place the detector deep underground so that the earth above can reduce the cosmic ray rate to acceptable levels.

== Neutrino telescopes ==
Researchers can aim neutrino detectors at astrophysics observations, since many astrophysical events are believed to emit neutrinos.

Underwater neutrino telescopes:

- DUMAND Project (off Hawaii; 1976–1995; cancelled)
- Baikal Deep Underwater Neutrino Telescope (in Siberia; 1993 on)
- ANTARES (in the Mediterranean Sea; 2006 on)
- KM3NeT (in the Mediterranean Sea; under construction since 2013; as of 2024, around 10% of the detector is taking data)
- NESTOR Project (off Greece; under development since 1998)
- P-ONE (off British Columbia; prospective telescope; path finders deployed in 2018, 2020)

Under-ice neutrino telescopes:

- AMANDA (1996–2009, superseded by IceCube)
- IceCube (2004 on) (Note: The $272M (£170M) IceCube instrument is not your typical telescope. Instead of collecting light from the stars, planets or other celestial objects, IceCube looks for ghostly particles called neutrinos that hurtle across space with high-energy cosmic rays. If all goes to plan, the observatory will reveal where these mysterious rays come from, and how they get to be so energetic. But that is just the start. Neutrino observatories such as IceCube will ultimately give astronomers fresh eyes with which to study the universe.)
- DeepCore and PINGU, an existing extension and a proposed extension of IceCube

Underground neutrino observatories:

- Baksan Neutrino Observatory, Russia, site of SAGE, GGNT and the future BLVSD.
- Gran Sasso National Laboratories (LNGS), Italy, site of Borexino, CUORE, and other experiments.
- Jiangmen Underground Neutrino Observatory (JUNO), Kaiping, Jiangmen, China
- Soudan Mine, home of Soudan 2, MINOS, and CDMS (Note: Later this month, Fermi National Accelerator Laboratory near Chicago will begin shooting trillions of subatomic "neutrino" particles through 450 miles of solid earth, their target a detector at the Soudan Underground Laboratory beneath this Iron Range town.)
- Kamioka Observatory, Japan, home of Super-Kamiokande (Super-K) and its successor Hyper-Kamiokande, currently under construction.
- Underground Neutrino Observatory, Mont Blanc, France / Italy
- Deep Underground Neutrino Experiment (DUNE), South Dakota, USA to Fermilab
- Sudbury Neutrino Observatory (SNOLAB), Sudbury, Ontario, Canada

Others:

- GALLEX (1991–1997; ended)
- Daya Bay Reactor Neutrino Experiment, (2011–2020), Daya bay, China
- Tauwer experiment (construction date to be determined)
- Antarctic Impulse Transient Antenna

== See also ==
- List of neutrino experiments
- Neutrino astronomy
- Multi-messenger astronomy
