= Neutrino astronomy =

Observing low-mass stellar particles

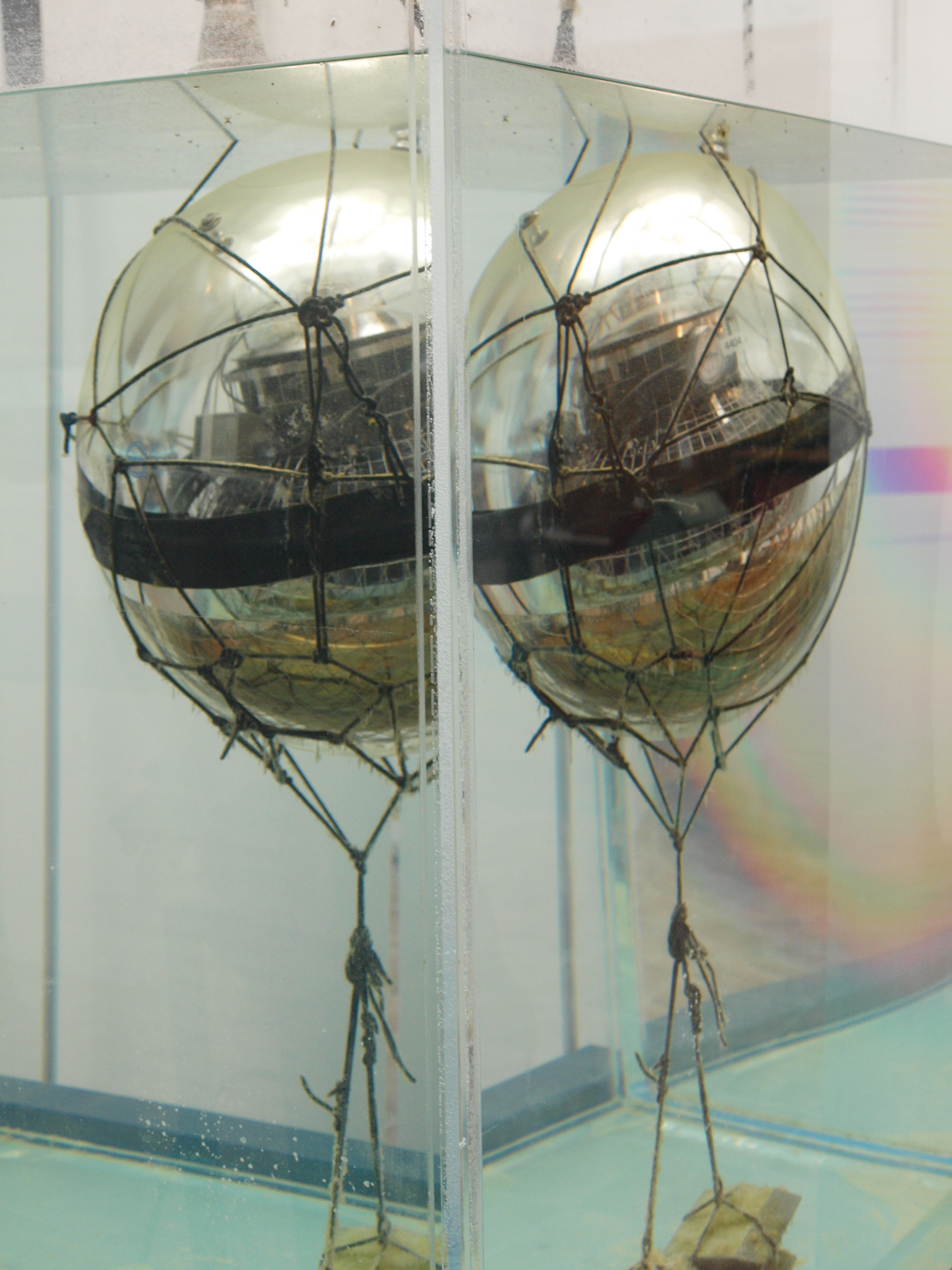
An optical module from a neutrino telescope. Neutrino telescopes consist of hundreds to thousands of optical modules distributed over a large volume.

Neutrino astronomy is a branch of astronomy that gathers information about astronomical objects by observing and studying neutrinos emitted by them with the help of neutrino detectors in special Earth observatories. It is an emerging field in astroparticle physics providing insights into the high-energy and non-thermal processes in the universe.

Neutrinos are nearly massless and electrically neutral or chargeless elementary particles. They are created as a result of certain types of radioactive decay, nuclear reactions such as those that take place in the Sun or high energy astrophysical phenomena, in nuclear reactors, or when cosmic rays hit atoms in the atmosphere. Neutrinos rarely interact with matter (only via the weak nuclear force), travel at nearly the speed of light in straight lines, pass through large amounts of matter without any notable absorption or without being deflected by magnetic fields. Unlike photons, neutrinos rarely scatter along their trajectory. But like photons, neutrinos are some of the most common particles in the universe. Because of this, neutrinos offer a unique opportunity to observe processes that are inaccessible to optical telescopes, such as reactions in the Sun's core. Neutrinos that are created in the Sun's core are barely absorbed, so a large quantity of them escape from the Sun and reach the Earth. Neutrinos can also offer a very strong pointing direction compared to charged particle cosmic rays.

Neutrinos are very hard to detect due to their non-interactive nature, which poses significant challenges to the design and construction of neutrino detectors. In order to detect neutrinos, the detectors must be isolated from cosmic rays and other background radiation, which can penetrate hundreds of meters of rock. Thus neutrino detectors are placed many hundreds of meters underground, usually at the bottom of mines. They also need to be very large in order to detect a significant number of neutrinos. In general, a neutrino detector consists of a large volume of material (often in the order of thousands of tons) that can interact with a passing neutrino. A number of sensors placed around or between said material detect the resulting interactions. A common design consists of a large volume of water (either in a tank or in the form of ice sheets) surrounded by optical sensors. Occasionally, neutrinos collide with a proton or neutron inside an atom of a water molecule, and the resulting interaction produces radiation that is detected by the sensors. The IceCube Neutrino Observatory, built in 2010 near the South Pole, the largest neutrino detector in the world, utilizes such a design. Apart from water, large volumes of chlorine and gallium have also been used, which work by detecting when argon or germanium, respectively, are created when neutrinos interact with the original element. Super-Kamiokande in Japan, along with ANTARES and KM3NeT in the Mediterranean are some other notable neutrino detectors.

Since neutrinos are very difficult to detect, the only bodies that have been studied in this way are the sun and the supernova SN1987A, which exploded in 1987. Scientists predicted that supernova explosions produce bursts of neutrinos, and a similar burst was actually detected from Supernova 1987A. In the future, neutrino astronomy promises to discover other aspects of the universe, including coincidental gravitational waves, gamma ray bursts, the cosmic neutrino background, origins of ultra-high-energy neutrinos, neutrino properties (such as neutrino mass hierarchy), dark matter properties, etc. It will become an integral part of multi-messenger astronomy, complementing gravitational astronomy and traditional telescopic astronomy.

== History ==
Neutrinos were first recorded in 1956 by Clyde Cowan and Frederick Reines in an experiment employing a nearby nuclear reactor as a neutrino source. Their discovery was acknowledged with a Nobel Prize in Physics in 1995.

This was followed by the first atmospheric neutrino detection in 1965 by two groups almost simultaneously. One was led by Frederick Reines who operated a liquid scintillator – the Case-Witwatersrand-Irvine or CWI detector – in the East Rand gold mine in South Africa at an 8.8 km water depth equivalent. The other was a Bombay-Osaka-Durham collaboration that operated in the Indian Kolar Gold Field mine at an equivalent water depth of 7.5 km. Although the KGF group detected neutrino candidates two months later than Reines CWI, they were given formal priority due to publishing their findings two weeks earlier.

In 1968, Raymond Davis, Jr. and John N. Bahcall successfully detected the first solar neutrinos in the Homestake experiment. Davis, along with Japanese physicist Masatoshi Koshiba were jointly awarded half of the 2002 Nobel Prize in Physics "for pioneering contributions to astrophysics, in particular for the detection of cosmic neutrinos (the other half went to Riccardo Giacconi for corresponding pioneering contributions which have led to the discovery of cosmic X-ray sources)."

The first generation of undersea neutrino telescope projects began with the proposal by Moisey Markov in 1960 "to install detectors deep in a lake or a sea and to determine the location of charged particles with the help of Cherenkov radiation."

The first underwater neutrino telescope began as the DUMAND project. DUMAND stands for Deep Underwater Muon and Neutrino Detector. The project began in 1976 and although it was eventually cancelled in 1995, it acted as a precursor to many of the following telescopes in the following decades.

The Baikal Neutrino Telescope is installed in the southern part of Lake Baikal in Russia. The detector is located at a depth of 1.1 km and began surveys in 1980. In 1993, it was the first to deploy three strings to reconstruct the muon trajectories as well as the first to record atmospheric neutrinos underwater.

AMANDA (Antarctic Muon And Neutrino Detector Array) used the 3 km thick ice layer at the South Pole and was located several hundred meters from the Amundsen-Scott station. Holes 60 cm in diameter were drilled with pressurized hot water in which strings with optical modules were deployed before the water refroze. The depth proved to be insufficient to be able to reconstruct the trajectory due to the scattering of light on air bubbles. A second group of 4 strings were added in 1995/96 to a depth of about 2000 m that was sufficient for track reconstruction. The AMANDA array was subsequently upgraded until January 2000 when it consisted of 19 strings with a total of 667 optical modules at a depth range between 1500 m and 2000 m. AMANDA would eventually be the predecessor to IceCube in 2005.

An example of an early neutrino detector is the Artyomovsk Scintillation Detector (ASD), located in the Soledar Salt Mine in Ukraine at a depth of more than 100 m. It was created in the Department of High Energy Leptons and Neutrino Astrophysics of the Institute of Nuclear Research of the USSR Academy of Sciences in 1969 to study antineutrino fluxes from collapsing stars in the Galaxy, as well as the spectrum and interactions of muons of cosmic rays with energies up to 10 ^ 13 eV. A feature of the detector is a 100-ton scintillation tank with dimensions on the order of the length of an electromagnetic shower with an initial energy of 100 GeV.

=== 21st century ===
After the decline of DUMAND the participating groups split into three branches to explore deep sea options in the Mediterranean Sea. ANTARES was anchored to the sea floor in the region off Toulon at the French Mediterranean coast. It consists of 12 strings, each carrying 25 "storeys" equipped with three optical modules, an electronic container, and calibration devices down to a maximum depth of 2475 m.

NEMO (NEutrino Mediterranean Observatory) was pursued by Italian groups to investigate the feasibility of a cubic-kilometer scale deep-sea detector. A suitable site at a depth of 3.5 km about 100 km off Capo Passero at the South-Eastern coast of Sicily has been identified. From 2007 to 2011 the first prototyping phase tested a "mini-tower" with 4 bars deployed for several weeks near Catania at a depth of 2 km. The second phase as well as plans to deploy the full-size prototype tower will be pursued in the KM3NeT framework.

The NESTOR Project was installed in 2004 to a depth of 4 km and operated for one month until a failure of the cable to shore forced it to be terminated. The data taken still successfully demonstrated the detector's functionality and provided a measurement of the atmospheric muon flux. The proof of concept will be implemented in the KM3Net framework.

The second generation of deep-sea neutrino telescope projects reach or even exceed the size originally conceived by the DUMAND pioneers. IceCube, located at the South Pole and incorporating its predecessor AMANDA, was completed in December 2010. Consisting of 5160 digital optical modules installed on 86 strings at depths of 1450 to 2550 m in the Antarctic ice, in 2013 it became the first experiment to detect astrophysical (cosmic) neutrinos. The KM3NeT in the Mediterranean Sea and the GVD are in their preparatory/prototyping phase. IceCube instruments 1 km^{3} of ice. GVD is also planned to cover 1 km^{3} but at a much higher energy threshold. KM3NeT is planned to cover several km^{3} and have two components; ARCA (Astroparticle Research with Cosmics in the Abyss) and ORCA (Oscillations Research with Cosmics in the Abyss). Both KM3NeT and GVD have completed at least part of their construction and it is expected that these two along with IceCube will form a global neutrino observatory.

In July 2018, the IceCube Neutrino Observatory announced that they have traced an extremely-high-energy neutrino that hit their Antarctica-based research station in September 2017 back to its point of origin in the blazar TXS 0506+056 located 3.7 billion light-years away in the direction of the constellation Orion. This was the first time that a neutrino detector has been used to locate an object in space and that a source of cosmic rays has been identified. In November 2022, another significant progress towards identifying the origin of cosmic rays came when IceCube reported the observation of 79 neutrinos with an energy over 1 TeV originated from the nearby galaxy M77. These findings in a well-known object are expected to help study the active nucleus of this galaxy, as well as serving as a baseline for future observations. And in June 2023, IceCube reported the first detection of neutrinos from the galactic plane of the Milky Way.

== Detection methods ==
Neutrinos interact incredibly rarely with matter, so the vast majority of neutrinos will pass through a detector without interacting. If a neutrino does interact, it will only do so once. Therefore, to perform neutrino astronomy, large detectors must be used to obtain enough statistics.

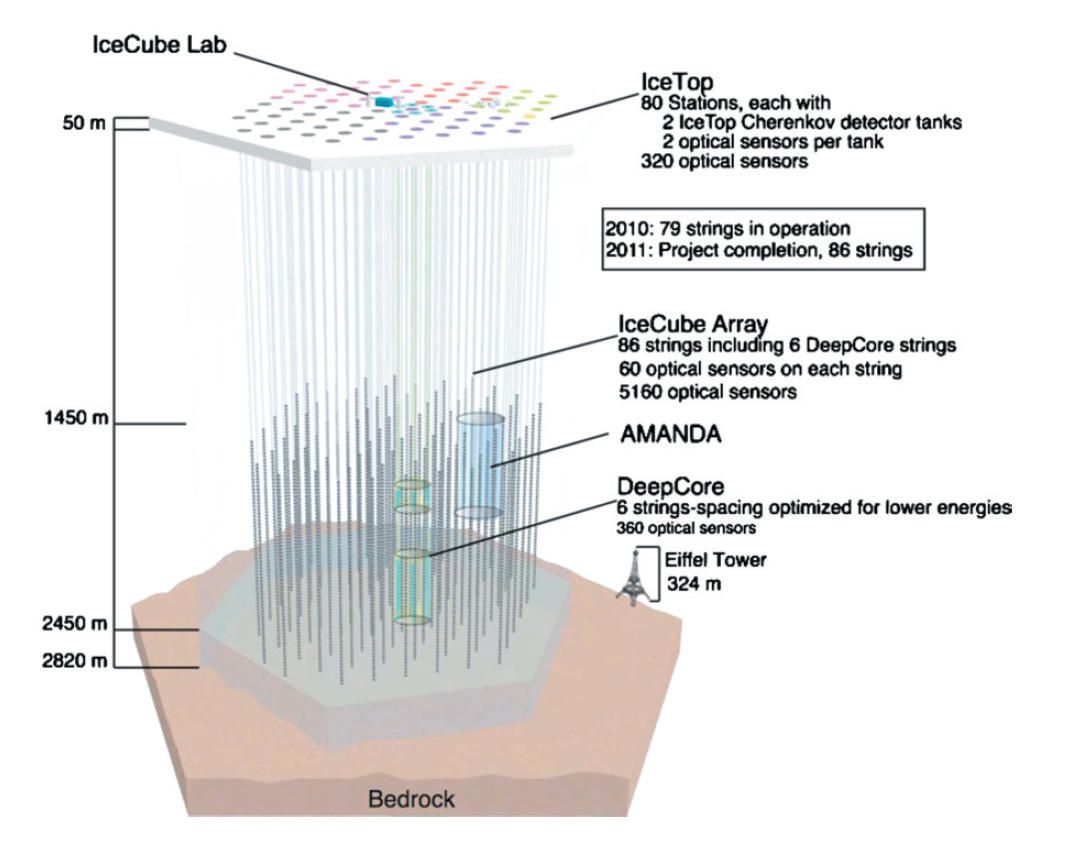
The IceCube Neutrino Detector at the South Pole. The PMTs are under more than a kilometer of ice, and will detect the photons from neutrino interactions within a cubic kilometer of ice.

The method of neutrino detection depends on the energy and type of the neutrino. A famous example is that anti-electron neutrinos can interact with a nucleus in the detector by inverse beta decay and produce a positron and a neutron. The positron immediately will annihilate with an electron, producing two 511keV photons. The neutron will attach to another nucleus and give off a gamma with an energy of a few MeV. In general, neutrinos can interact through neutral-current and charged-current interactions. In neutral-current interactions, the neutrino interacts with a nucleus or electron and the neutrino retains its original flavor. In charged-current interactions, the neutrino is absorbed by the nucleus and produces a lepton corresponding to the neutrino's flavor ($\ce{\nu_{e} -> e^-}$,$\ce{\nu_{\mu} -> \mu^{-}}$, etc.). If the charged resultants are moving fast enough, they can create Cherenkov light.

To observe neutrino interactions, detectors use photomultiplier tubes (PMTs) to detect individual photons. From the timing of the photons, it is possible to determine the time and place of the neutrino interaction. If the neutrino creates a muon during its interaction, then the muon will travel in a line, creating a "track" of Cherenkov photons. The data from this track can be used to reconstruct the directionality of the muon. For high-energy interactions, the neutrino and muon directions are the same, so it's possible to tell where the neutrino came from. This pointing direction is important in extra-solar system neutrino astronomy. Along with time, position, and possibly direction, it's possible to infer the energy of the neutrino from the interactions. The number of photons emitted is related to the neutrino energy, and neutrino energy is important for measuring the fluxes from solar and geo-neutrinos.

Due to the rareness of neutrino interactions, it is important to maintain a low background signal. For this reason, most neutrino detectors are constructed under a rock or water overburden. This overburden shields against most cosmic rays in the atmosphere; only some of the highest-energy muons are able to penetrate to the depths of the detectors. Detectors must include ways of dealing with data from muons so as to not confuse them with neutrinos. Along with more complicated measures, if a muon track is first detected outside of the desired "fiducial" volume, the event is treated as a muon and not considered. Ignoring events outside the fiducial volume also decreases the signal from radiation outside the detector.

Despite shielding efforts, it is inevitable that some background will make it into the detector, many times in the form of radioactive impurities within the detector itself. At this point, if it is impossible to differentiate between the background and true signal, a Monte Carlo simulation must be used to model the background. While it may be unknown if an individual event is background or signal, it is possible to detect an excess about the background, signifying existence of the desired signal.

== Applications ==
When astronomical bodies, such as the Sun, are studied using light, only the surface of the object can be directly observed. Any light produced in the core of a star will interact with gas particles in the outer layers of the star, taking hundreds of thousands of years to make it to the surface, making it impossible to observe the core directly. Since neutrinos are also created in the cores of stars (as a result of stellar fusion), the core can be observed using neutrino astronomy. Other sources of neutrinos- such as neutrinos released by supernovae- have been detected. Several neutrino experiments have formed the Supernova Early Warning System (SNEWS), where they search for an increase of neutrino flux that could signal a supernova event. There are currently goals to detect neutrinos from other sources, such as active galactic nuclei (AGN), as well as gamma-ray bursts and starburst galaxies. Neutrino astronomy may also indirectly detect dark matter.

=== Supernova warning ===
Seven neutrino experiments (Super-K, LVD, IceCube, KamLAND, Borexino, Daya Bay, and HALO) work together as the Supernova Early Warning System (SNEWS). In a core collapse supernova, ninety-nine percent of the energy released will be in neutrinos. While photons can be trapped in the dense supernova for hours, neutrinos are able to escape on the order of seconds. Since neutrinos travel at roughly the speed of light, they can reach Earth before photons do. If two or more of SNEWS detectors observe a coincidence of an increased flux of neutrinos, an alert is sent to professional and amateur astronomers to be on the lookout for supernova light. By using the distance between detectors and the time difference between detections, the alert can also include directionality as to the supernova's location in the sky.

=== Stellar processes ===
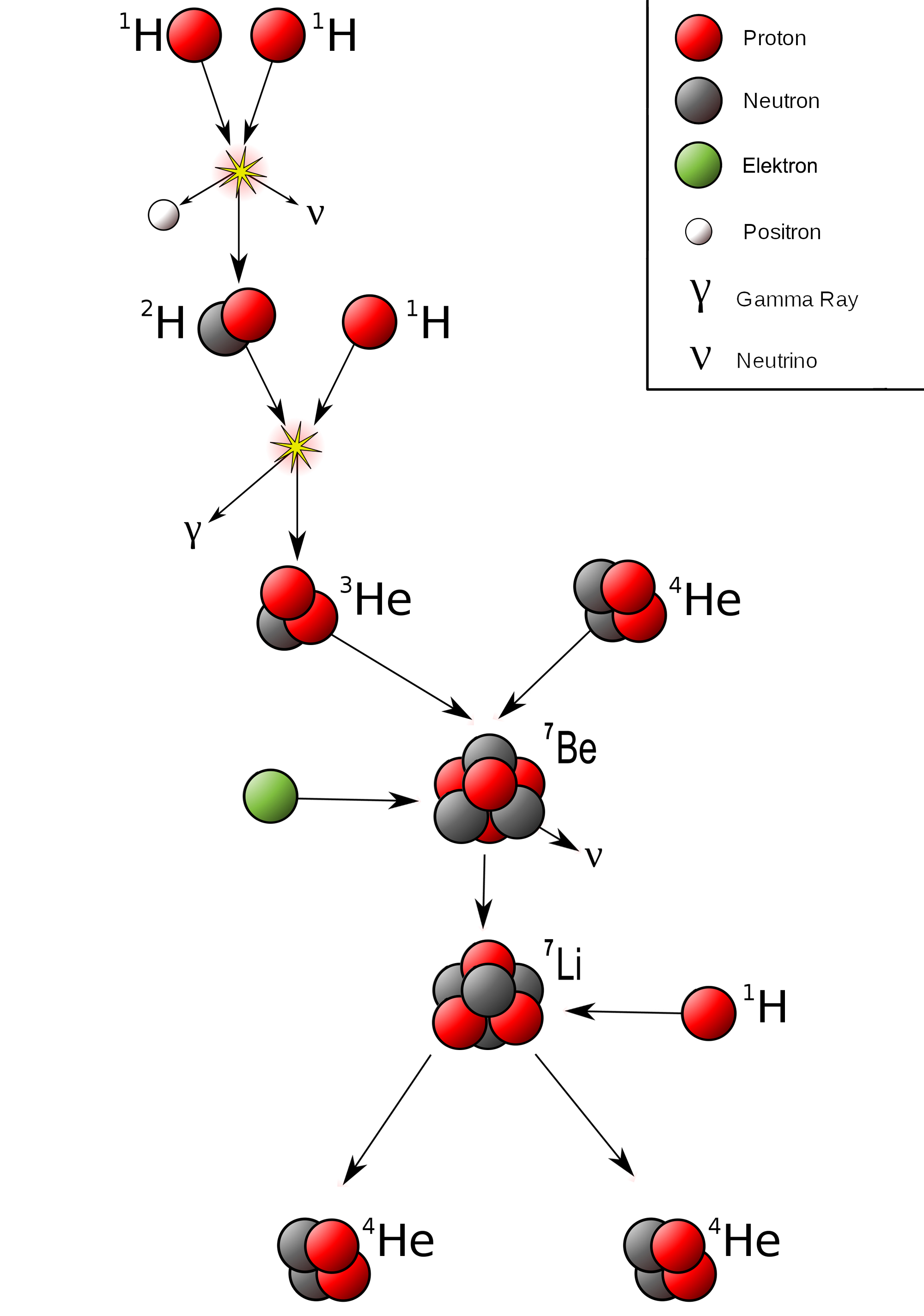
The proton-proton fusion chain that occurs within the Sun. This process is responsible for the majority of the Sun's energy.

The Sun, like other stars, is powered by nuclear fusion in its core. The core is incredibly large, meaning that photons produced in the core will take a long time to diffuse outward. Therefore, neutrinos are the only way that we can obtain real-time data about the nuclear processes in the Sun.

There are two main processes for stellar nuclear fusion. The first is the Proton-Proton (PP) chain, in which protons are fused together into helium, sometimes temporarily creating the heavier elements of lithium, beryllium, and boron along the way. The second is the CNO cycle, in which carbon, nitrogen, and oxygen are fused with protons, and then undergo alpha decay (helium nucleus emission) to begin the cycle again. The PP chain is the primary process in the Sun, while the CNO cycle is more dominant in stars more massive than the Sun.

Each step in the process has an allowed spectra of energy for the neutrino (or a discrete energy for electron capture processes). The relative rates of the Sun's nuclear processes can be determined by observations in its flux at different energies. This would shed insight into the Sun's properties, such as metallicity, which is the composition of heavier elements.

Borexino is one of the detectors studying solar neutrinos. In 2018, they found 5σ significance for the existence of neutrinos from the fusing of two protons with an electron (pep neutrinos). In 2020, they found for the first time evidence of CNO neutrinos in the Sun. Improvements on the CNO measurement will be especially helpful in determining the Sun's metallicity.

=== Composition and structure of Earth ===
The interior of Earth contains radioactive elements such as $\ce{^{40}K}$ and the decay chains of $\ce{^{238}U}$ and $\ce{^{232}Th}$. These elements decay via Beta decay, which emits an anti-neutrino. The energies of these anti-neutrinos are dependent on the parent nucleus. Therefore, by detecting the anti-neutrino flux as a function of energy, we can obtain the relative compositions of these elements and set a limit on the total power output of Earth's geo-reactor. Most of our current data about the core and mantle of Earth comes from seismic data, which does not provide any information as to the nuclear composition of these layers.

Borexino has detected these geo-neutrinos through the process $\ce{\bar{\nu}+p^+\longrightarrow e^+ {+n}}$. The resulting positron will immediately annihilate with an electron and produce two gamma-rays each with an energy of 511keV (the rest mass of an electron). The neutron will later be captured by another nucleus, which will lead to a 2.22MeV gamma-ray as the nucleus de-excites. This process on average takes on the order of 256 microseconds. By searching for time and spatial coincidence of these gamma rays, the experimenters can be certain there was an event.

Using over 3,200 days of data, Borexino used geoneutrinos to place constraints on the composition and power output of the mantle. They found that the ratio of $\ce{^{238}U}$ to $\ce{^{232}Th}$ is the same as chondritic meteorites. The power output from uranium and thorium in Earth's mantle was found to be 14.2–35.7 TW with a 68% confidence interval.

Neutrino tomography also provides insight into the interior of Earth. For neutrinos with energies of a few TeV, the interaction probability becomes non-negligible when passing through Earth. The interaction probability will depend on the number of nucleons the neutrino passed along its path, which is directly related to density. If the initial flux is known (as it is in the case of atmospheric neutrinos), then detecting the final flux provides information about the interactions that occurred. The density can then be extrapolated from knowledge of these interactions. This can provide an independent check on the information obtained from seismic data.

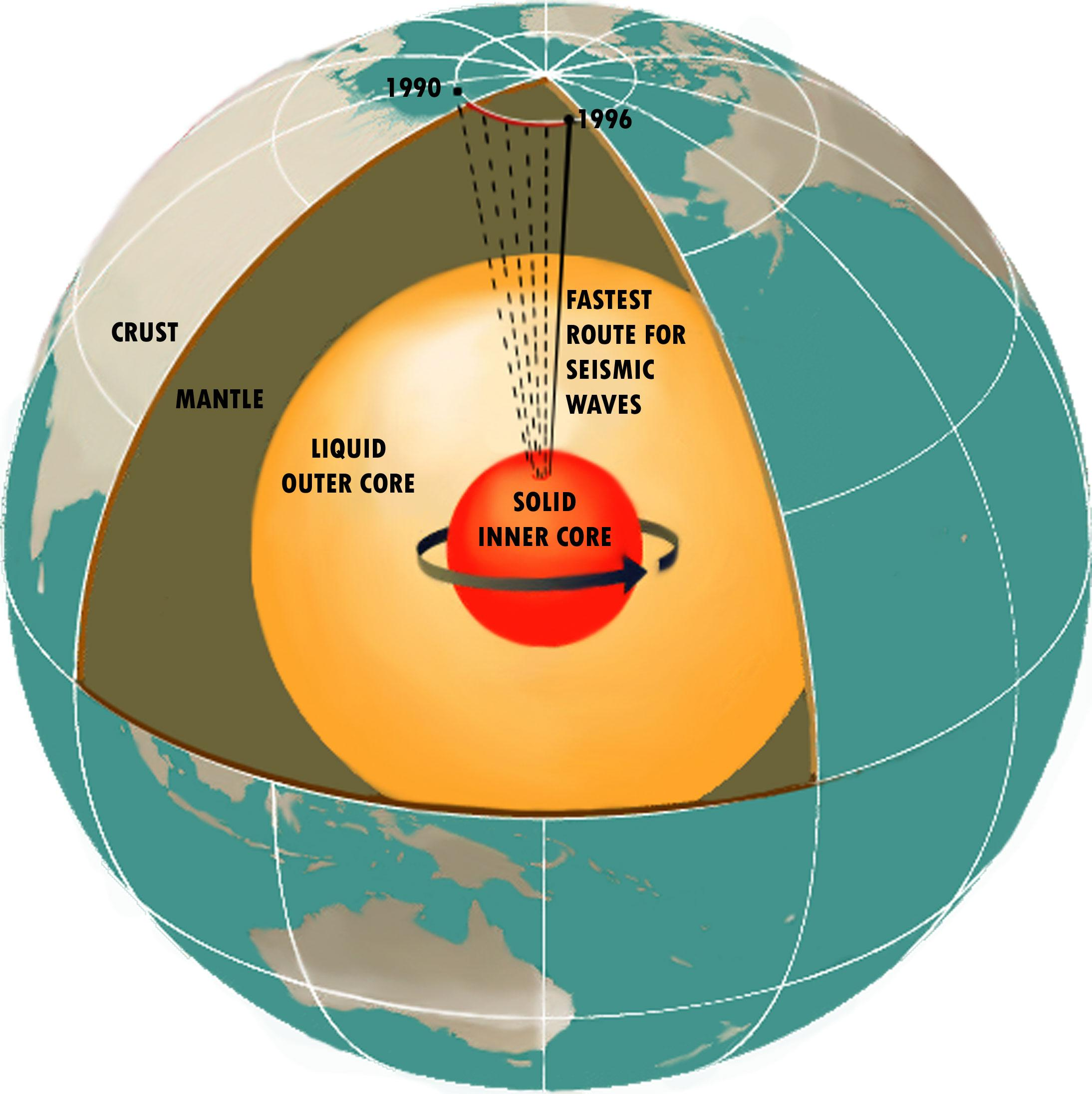
The interior of the Earth as we know it. Currently, our information comes only from seismic data. Neutrinos would be an independent check on this data.

In 2018, one year worth of IceCube data was evaluated to perform neutrino tomography. The analysis studied upward going muons, which provide both the energy and directionality of the neutrinos after passing through the Earth. A model of Earth with five layers of constant density was fit to the data, and the resulting density agreed with seismic data. The values determined for the total mass of Earth, the mass of the core, and the moment of inertia all agree with the data obtained from seismic and gravitational data. With the current data, the uncertainties on these values are still large, but future data from IceCube and KM3NeT will place tighter restrictions on this data.

=== High-energy astrophysical events ===
Neutrinos can either be primary cosmic rays (astrophysical neutrinos), or be produced from cosmic ray interactions. In the latter case, the primary cosmic ray will produce pions and kaons in the atmosphere. As these hadrons decay, they produce neutrinos (called atmospheric neutrinos). At low energies, the flux of atmospheric neutrinos is many times greater than astrophysical neutrinos. At high energies, the pions and kaons have a longer lifetime (due to relativistic time dilation). The hadrons are now more likely to interact before they decay. Because of this, the astrophysical neutrino flux will dominate at high energies (~100TeV). To perform neutrino astronomy of high-energy objects, experiments rely on the highest energy neutrinos.

To perform astronomy of distant objects, a strong angular resolution is required. Neutrinos are electrically neutral and interact weakly, so they travel mostly unperturbed in straight lines. If the neutrino interacts within a detector and produces a muon, the muon will produce an observable track. At high energies, the neutrino direction and muon direction are closely correlated, so it is possible to trace back the direction of the incoming neutrino.

These high-energy neutrinos are either the primary or secondary cosmic rays produced by energetic astrophysical processes. Observing neutrinos could provide insights into these processes beyond what is observable with electromagnetic radiation. In the case of the neutrino detected from a distant blazar, multi-wavelength astronomy was used to show spatial coincidence, confirming the blazar as the source. In the future, neutrinos could be used to supplement electromagnetic and gravitational observations, leading to multi-messenger astronomy.

== See also ==
- List of neutrino experiments
