= PKS 1741−03 =

Blazar in the constellation of Ophiuchus

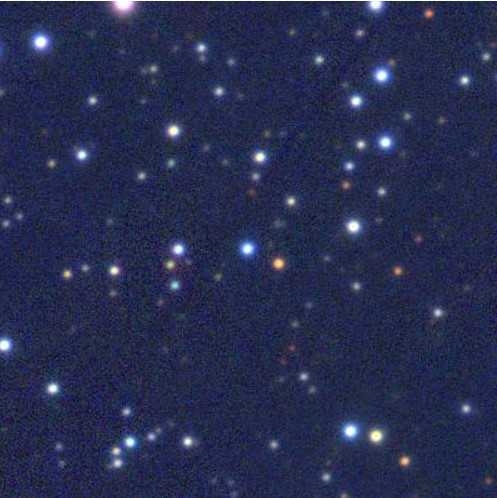
- The blazar PKS 1741−03

Observation data (J2000.0 epoch)
- Constellation: Ophiuchus
- Right ascension: 17^{h} 43^{m} 58.8561^{s}
- Declination: −03° 50′ 04.617″
- Redshift: 1.054000
- Heliocentric radial velocity: 315,981 km/s
- Distance: 7.726 Gly
- Apparent magnitude (V): 20.40

Characteristics
- Type: FSRQ, HPQ, Blazar

Other designations
- PKS 1741−038, OHIO T -068, LEDA 2829362, INTREF 817, QSO B1741−038, CGRaBS J1743−0350, 4FGL J1744.2−0353

PKS 1741−03 is a blazar located in the constellation of Ophiuchus. This core-dominated quasar is located at a redshift of (z) 1.054, found to be highly polarized. It was first discovered in 1970 as an extragalactic radio source by astronomers and has a radio spectrum appearing to be flat, making it a flat-spectrum radio quasar.

== Description ==
PKS 1741−03 is found to undergo a period of extreme scattering events (ESE). This is a dramatic change represented in flux density of radio sources, usually showing a decreasing trend in flux with a duration period of at least several weeks to months. During its ESE period, there was an increase in its angular diameter by 0.7 milliarcsecond. When observed on timescales of few months, PKS 1741−03 exhibited extreme variations at 2.7 GHz but no traces of violent outbursts in its light curve. Variability was also detected in the blazar at 1.49 GHz likely caused by refractive interstellar scintillation.

Radio imaging made by Very Long baseline Interferometry shows PKS 1741−03 to be a simple but compact source, consisting of two components dominated by a central radio core. There is presence of much weaker emission located south of the core which becomes noticed at high frequencies. Imaging made by Very Long Baseline Array shows PKS 1741−03 has a weak component at both epochs. Other VLBI observations at 2 and 8 GHz shows a bright component and a diffused jet structure.

Seven components have been discovered inside the parsec-scale jet of PKS 1741−03. Based on interferometric imaging, the jet components display superluminal motion of various speeds with ranges of between 3.5 and 6.1c. Further evidence also shows they are moving ballistically with the exception of one component displaying signs of bent trajectory.

In 2022, PKS 1741−03 was found to be a candidate source of a neutrino event. IceCube Observatory located at the South Pole detected a high-energy neutrino event, designated as 220205B above 200 TeV and found it to be associated with the blazar. This observation occurred while PKS 1741−03 was undergoing a powerful flare.
