= Pacific Ocean Neutrino Experiment =

Proposed Neutrino observatory under the Pacific Ocean

- Alternative names: P-ONE
- Organization: The P-ONE Collaboration
- Location: Pacific Ocean near Canada
- Website: www.pacific-neutrino.org

Telescopes
- Telescope: Neutrino

The Pacific Ocean Neutrino Experiment, or P-ONE, is a proposed neutrino observatory using an area of the north-eastern Pacific Ocean off the coast of British Columbia, Canada, to entrap neutrinos for study and experimentation. The proposal involves building a multi-cubic-kilometer neutrino telescope at Ocean Networks Canada's Cascadia Basin site in the North East Pacific Time-series Underwater Networked Experiment (NEPTUNE) coastal network. Although a considerable number of neutrinos are produced in the universe, they are emitted at a considerably low flux, and therefore require a large detection array for their capture. The spokesperson of the P-ONE collaboration is Matthias Danninger from the Simon Fraser University.

== See also ==
- ANTARES (telescope)
- Baikal Deep Underwater Neutrino Telescope
- Hyper-Kamiokande
- IceCube Neutrino Observatory
- KM3NeT
- MINOS
- Super-Kamiokande
- Supernova Early Warning System
