= Antarctic Muon And Neutrino Detector Array =

Neutrino telescope at the South Pole (1996–2009)

The Antarctic Muon And Neutrino Detector Array (AMANDA) was a neutrino telescope that was located beneath the Amundsen–Scott South Pole Station. In 2005, after nine years of operation, AMANDA became part of its successor project, the IceCube Neutrino Observatory.

AMANDA consisted of optical modules, each containing one photomultiplier tube, sunk in Antarctic ice cap at a depth of about 1500 to 1900 metres. In its latest development stage, known as AMANDA-II, AMANDA was made up of an array of 677 optical modules mounted on 19 separate strings that are spread out in a rough circle with a diameter of 200 metres. Each string had several dozen modules, that were put in place by "drilling" a hole in the ice using a hot-water hose, sinking the cable with attached optical modules in, and then letting the ice freeze around it.

Diagram from the related precursor Project DUMAND illustrating the strings of sensors and detail of one of the sensors

AMANDA detected very high energy neutrinos (50+ GeV) which pass through the Earth from the northern hemisphere and then react just as they are leaving upwards through the Antarctic ice. The muonic neutrinos interact with the quarks of the protons and neutrons of nuclei of oxygen or hydrogen atoms contained in the surrounding water ice through the weak nuclear force, producing a muon and a hadronic shower:

$\nu_\mu + n^0$ → $\mu^- + p^+ \,$ and $\,\,\nu_\mu + p^+$ → $\mu^- + p^+ + \pi^+$

The optical modules detected the Cherenkov radiation from these latter particles, and by analysis of the timing of photon hits could approximately determine the direction of the original neutrino with a spatial resolution of approximately 2 degrees.

AMANDA's goal was an attempt at neutrino astronomy, identifying and characterizing extra-solar sources of neutrinos. Compared to underground detectors like Super-Kamiokande in Japan, AMANDA was capable of looking at higher energy neutrinos because it is not limited in volume to a manmade tank; however, it had much less accuracy because of the less controlled conditions and wider spacing of photomultipliers. Super-Kamiokande can look at much greater detail at neutrinos from the Sun and those generated in the Earth's atmosphere; however, at higher energies, the spectrum should include neutrinos dominated by those from sources outside the Solar System. Such a new view into the cosmos could give important clues in the search for dark matter and other astrophysical phenomena.

After two years of integrated operation as part of IceCube, the AMANDA counting house (in the Martin A. Pomerantz Observatory) was decommissioned in July and August 2009.

== See also ==
- Antarctic Impulse Transient Antenna
- DUMAND Project
- IceCube Neutrino Observatory
- Neutrino detector
- Radio Ice Cerenkov Experiment
