= Neutrino Array Radio Calibration =

South Pole experiment for detecting ultra high energy electron neutrinos

The Neutrino Array Radio Calibration (NARC) experiment was the successor to the Radio Ice Cherenkov Experiment (RICE) which served as a testbed for future development of an eventual large-scale neutrino radio-detection array. NARC involved detecting ultra high energy electron neutrinos through their interactions with ice molecules in the Antarctic icecap, based on the principle of radio coherence. Experimentally, the goal was to detect and measure long-wavelength (radiofrequency) pulses resulting from this interaction. The experiment ended 2012 (end of data-taking 2010). The experiment is succeeded by the Askaryan Radio Array (ARA) experiment.
