= Glashow resonance =

Resonant formation of the W boson in antineutrino-electron collisions

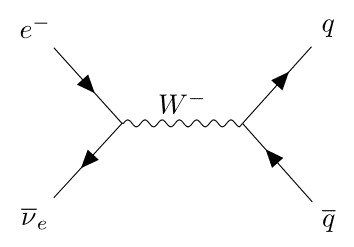
Feynman diagram of the Glashow resonance

In particle physics, the Glashow resonance is the resonant formation of the W boson in antineutrino-electron collisions: ν̅_{e} + e^{−} → W^{−}. It was proposed by Sheldon Glashow in 1959.

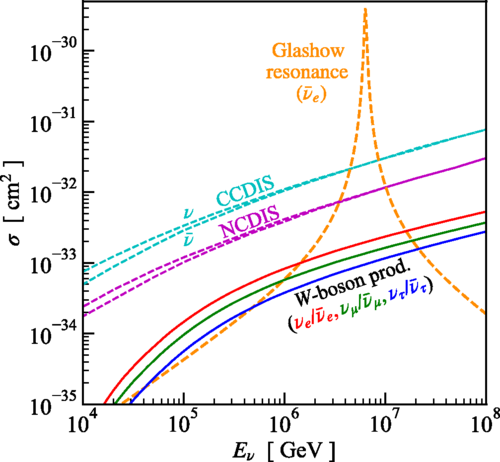
Cross sections between neutrinos and ^{16}O for W-boson production, compared to those for charged-current (CC) and neutral current (NC) deep inelastic scattering (DIS), and the predicted Glashow resonance

== Theory ==
The threshold antineutrino energy for this process (for the electron at rest in the laboratory frame) is given by the formula

$$E_\nu = \frac{M_W^2 c^2-(m_e^2+m_\nu^2) c^2}{2m_e} \approx \frac{M_W^2 c^2}{2m_e}$$

(here is, for completeness, included also the antineutrino mass, which vanishes in the Standard Model), which gives 6.3 PeV, a huge energy for a fundamental particle. This process is considered for the detection and studies of high-energy cosmic neutrinos at the IceCube experiment, at the ANTARES neutrino telescope, and at the KM3NeT neutrino telescope.

== Detection ==
A report observing the resonance at 2.3σ level has been made by the IceCube experiment in March 2021.
