= TXS 0506+056 =

Blazar galaxy and source of astrophysical neutrinos

Observation data (J2000 epoch)
- Constellation: Orion
- Right ascension: 05^{h} 09^{m} 25.9645434784^{s}
- Declination: +05° 41′ 35.333636817″
- Redshift: 0.3365 ± 0.0010
- Apparent magnitude (V): 14.78
- Apparent magnitude (B): 14.95

Characteristics
- Type: Blazar of BL Lac-type

Other designations
- QSO J0509+0541, EGR J0509+0550, 2MASS J05092597+054135, VSOP J0509+0541

TXS 0506+056 is a very high energy blazar – a quasar with a relativistic jet pointing directly towards Earth – of BL Lac-type. With a redshift of 0.3365 ± 0.0010, it has a luminosity distance of about 1.75 gigaparsecs (5.7 billion light-years). Its approximate location on the sky is off the left shoulder of the constellation Orion. Discovered as a radio source in 1983, the blazar has since been observed across the entire electromagnetic spectrum.

TXS 0506+056 is the first known source of high energy astrophysical neutrinos, identified following the IceCube-170922A neutrino event in an early example of multi-messenger astronomy. The only astronomical sources previously observed by neutrino detectors were the Sun and supernova 1987A, which were detected decades earlier at much lower neutrino energies.

== Observational history ==
The object has been detected by numerous astronomical surveys, so has numerous valid source designations. The most commonly used, TXS 0506+056, comes from its inclusion in the Texas Survey of radio sources (standard abbreviation TXS) and its approximate equatorial coordinates in the B1950 equinox used by that survey.

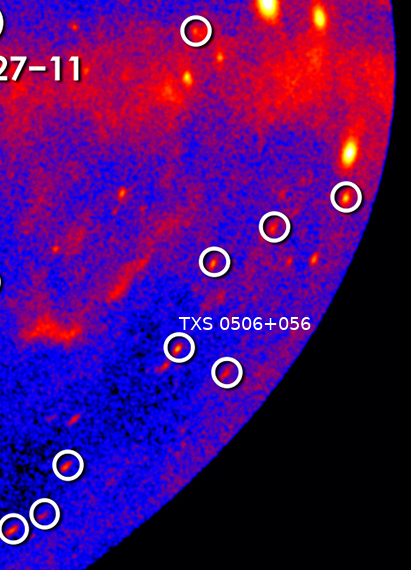
Location of TXS 0506+056 as observed in gamma rays (energies greater than 1 GeV) by the Fermi Gamma-ray Space Telescope

TXS 0506+056 was first discovered as a radio source in 1983. It was identified as an active galaxy in the 1990s, and a possible blazar in the early 2000s. By 2009 it was regarded as a confirmed blazar and catalogued as a BL Lac object. Gamma rays from TXS 0506+056 were detected by the EGRET and Fermi Gamma-ray Space Telescope missions.

Radio observations using very-long-baseline interferometry have shown apparent superluminal motion in the blazar's jet. TXS 0506+056 is one of the blazars regularly monitored by the OVRO 40 meter Telescope, so has an almost-continuous radio light curve recorded from 2008 onwards.

The gamma-ray flux from TXS 0506+056 is highly variable, by at least a factor of a thousand, but on average it is in the top 4% of brightest gamma-ray sources on the sky. It is also very bright in radio waves, in the top 1% of sources. Given its distance, this makes TXS 0506+056 one of the most intrinsically powerful BL Lac objects known, particularly in high-energy gamma rays.

== Neutrino emission ==
On September 22, 2017, the IceCube Neutrino Observatory detected a high energy muon neutrino, dubbed IceCube-170922A. The neutrino carried an energy of ~290 tera–electronvolts (TeV); for comparison, the Large Hadron Collider can generate a maximum energy of 13 TeV. Within one minute of the neutrino detection, IceCube sent an automated alert to astronomers around the world with coordinates to search for a possible source.

A search of this region in the sky, 1.33 degrees across, yielded only one likely source: TXS 0506+056, a previously-known blazar, which was found to be in a flaring state of high gamma ray emission. It was subsequently observed at other wavelengths of light across the electromagnetic spectrum, including radio, infrared, optical, X-rays and gamma-rays. The detection of both neutrinos and light from the same object was an early example of multi-messenger astronomy.

A search of archived neutrino data from IceCube found evidence for an earlier flare of lower-energy neutrinos in 2014–2015 (a form of precovery), which supports identification of the blazar as a source of neutrinos. An independent analysis found no gamma-ray flare during this earlier period of neutrino emission, but supported its association with the blazar. The neutrinos emitted by TXS 0506+056 are six orders of magnitude higher in energy than those from any previously-identified astrophysical neutrino source (specifically, the 10~MeV scale neutrinos emitted by the Sun and the supernova SN 1987A).

The observations of high energy neutrinos and gamma-rays from this source imply that it is also a source of cosmic rays, because all three should be produced by the same physical processes, though no cosmic rays from TXS 0506+056 have been directly observed. In the blazar, a charged pion was produced by the interaction of a high-energy proton or nucleus (i.e. a cosmic ray) with the radiation field or with matter. The pion then decayed into a lepton and the neutrino. The neutrino interacts only weakly with matter, so it escaped the blazar. Upon reaching Earth, the neutrino interacted with the Antarctic ice to produce a muon, which was observed by the Cherenkov radiation it generated as it moved through the IceCube detector.

Analysis of 16 very long baseline radio array 15-GHz observations between 2009 and 2018 of TXS 0506+056 revealed the presence of a curved jet or potentially a collision of two jets, which could explain the 2014-2015 neutrino generation at the time of a low gamma-ray flux and indicate that TXS 0506+056 might be an atypical blazar.

In 2020, a study using MASTER global telescope network found that TXS 0506+056 was in an 'off' state in the optical spectrum 1 minute after the alert for IceCube-170922A event and switched back on 2 hours later. This would indicate that the blazar was in a state of neutrino efficiency.

== See also ==
- Messier 77 – a second neutrino source reported by IceCube in November 2022
- SN 1987A#Neutrino emissions – a burst of neutrinos observed to come from a supernova
- Neutrino astronomy
- GW170817 – the first multi-messenger event involving gravitational waves; occurred five weeks before IceCube-170922A
