= Leonidas Resvanis =

Greek physicist (born 1944)

Leonidas "Leo" K. Resvanis (Greek: Λεωνίδας Ρεσβάνης; born 1944) is a Greek physicist known for his work with neutrinos. He was a Professor of Physics at the University of Athens from 1976 until he retired and became Emeritus Professor in 2011. He served as the director of the Nestor Project.

Resvanis was born in Athens, Greece.

Resvanis is also the person who suggested to Burton Richter that Richter's new discovery be named the "psi" particle.

== Career ==
Resvanis received his B.Sc. in Physics from the University of Manchester, United Kingdom in 1965. He continued his studies at Johns Hopkins University, United States from where he received his PhD in High Energy Physics in 1971. His dissertation was entitled "Measurement of the strong interaction form factors in the semileptonic decays of the long lived neutral kaon".

Between 1971 and 1976 he worked in the United States, in the University of Pennsylvania as an assistant professor. In 1976 was elected a full Professor in the University of Athens.
