= DUMAND Project =

Proposed underwater neutrino telescope

The DUMAND Project (Deep Underwater Muon And Neutrino Detector Project) was a proposed underwater neutrino telescope to be built in the Pacific Ocean, off the shore of the island of Hawaii, five kilometers beneath the surface. It would have included thousands of strings of instruments occupying a cubic kilometer of the ocean.

Diagram illustrating the strings of sensors and detail of one of the sensors

The proposal called for two types of detectors: optical detectors to find the Cherenkov radiation emitted by secondary particles traveling faster than the speed of light in water, resulting from collisions by neutrinos, and hydrophones to listen for the acoustic signals generated by the interactions. Sophisticated signal processing would have combined the signals from many optical and acoustic sensors, allowing scientists to determine the direction from which the neutrino arrived, and to rule out false signals arising from other particles or acoustic sources. Because of the nature of the interaction between neutrinos and protons, DUMAND would have been most sensitive to ultra-high energy neutrinos, and completely insensitive to solar neutrinos.

Work began in about 1976, at Keahole Point, but the project cancelled in 1995 due to technical difficulties. Although it was never completed, DUMAND was in a sense a precursor of the Antarctic Muon And Neutrino Detector Array (AMANDA), and the water Cherenkov neutrino telescopes in the Mediterranean (ANTARES, NEMO and the NESTOR Project). The DUMAND hardware was also donated to NESTOR, to reduce costs and cut on development and construction time.
