= Askaryan Radio Array =

Detector designed to detect a few GZK neutrinos at the South Pole

The Askaryan Radio Array (ARA) is a detector designed to detect GZK neutrinos. It measures the enhanced radio-frequency radiation emitted during the interaction of the neutrino in Antarctic ice sheet. The detection is based on the Askaryan effect.

This detection technique is also being used by the Antarctic Impulse Transient Antenna (ANITA) and the Radio Ice Cerenkov Experiment (RICE) detectors. The ARA experiment will be built around the IceCube experiment, and will cover an area of approximately 100 square kilometers.

A 16-antenna prototype station, the "ARA Testbed", of the ARA system was installed January 2011 (season 2010–2011) and began operation allowing the ARA Collaboration to determine the estimated sensitivity of the array design: ARA-37 will cover 200 km^{2}with neutrino sensitivity of 10^{16}–10^{19} eV. Measurements of the radio background and ice attenuation length were reported.

The first ARA station was installed in the season (Antarctic summer season; winter in northern hemisphere) 2011–2012; stations 2 and 3 were installed in the season 2012–2013 and stations 4 and 5 in season 2017–2018. The ARA array had five stations as of 2018. The Phase 1 goal of ARA is 37 stations.

== Collaborators ==
- University of Delaware
- University of Hawaii
- University of Kansas
- University of Maryland
- University of Nebraska
- University of Wisconsin
- Free University of Brussels (IIHE)
- Ohio State University
- National Taiwan University
- University College London
- Technion – Israel Institute of Technology
- Weizmann Institute of Science
- University of Chicago
