= NESTOR Project =

Aborted neutrino telescope in Greece, now part of KM3NeT

The NESTOR Project (Neutrino Extended Submarine Telescope with Oceanographic Research Project) is an international scientific collaboration whose target is the deployment of a neutrino telescope on the sea floor off Pylos, Greece.

== Neutrino ==
Neutrinos are elementary particles first detected in the 1950s, long after their theoretical prediction by theorist Wolfgang Pauli. Neutrinos (or anti-neutrinos) are created during certain nuclear reactions, where protons are transformed into neutrons and vice versa. Neutrinos do not interact with matter via either the electromagnetic, the strong nuclear, or gravitational forces, since they are electrically neutral leptons and their rest mass is very small. They interact with the nucleons (neutrons and protons) only via weak nuclear interactions. Since they do not interact with matter via the electromagnetic or gravitational forces, it is extremely difficult to detect them. Since their mass is very small (less than 14 eV) they travel with speeds that are very close to the speed of light in vacuum.

== NESTOR Telescope ==
Because neutrinos are very weakly interacting, neutrino detectors must be very large to detect a significant number of neutrinos. After completion, NESTOR will consist of a large number of glass balls (the "eyes") containing photomultiplier tubes. The "eyes" are connected with star-shaped titanium frames. Many frames compose a NESTOR tower. The whole construction is placed at the bottom of the sea to reduce noise from cosmic radiation (depth 4000m). The detectors are connected with the terminal station through a 31-km-long deep-sea, optic fiber cable for data collection.

Pylos was selected for the installation of the telescope for several reasons. It combines deep water with close proximity to the shore, a convenient combination for the installation of the NESTOR towers and the communication and power supply cables. It is also located in an anti-diametric point with respect to the DUMAND neutrino telescope in the Pacific ocean and therefore, it is possible to compare observations and study correlations between the observed neutrino.

Original surveys of the seafloor were conducted in 1989, 1991, 1992 and scientific conferences of the NESTOR Collaboration were held in the 1990s.

In March 2003, the NESTOR prototype was lowered to the depth of 3800 meters some 30 kilometers off the coast of Greece. The prototype's results were published in 2005.

The spokesperson for the project was Leonidas Resvanis from University of Athens.

In 2014 the project was still applying funding to build the actual telescope.

The NESTOR collaboration is now (2018) part of the KM3NeT-collaboration. As such, they are not developing the NESTOR telescope anymore as its own instance, but Km3Net has a planned telescope site off the coast of Pylos (which can thus be seen as a continuation of the NESTOR project to build an underwater telescope off the coast of Pylos).

== See also ==
- Project DUMAND
- ANTARES
