= Askaryan radiation =

Optical phenomenon

The Askaryan radiation also known as Askaryan effect is the phenomenon whereby a particle traveling faster than the phase velocity of light in a dense dielectric (such as salt, ice or the lunar regolith) produces a shower of secondary charged particles which contains a charge anisotropy and emits a cone of coherent radiation in the radio or microwave part of the electromagnetic spectrum. The signal is a result of the Cherenkov radiation from individual particles in the shower. Wavelengths greater than the extent of the shower interfere constructively and thus create a radio or microwave signal which is strongest at the Cherenkov angle. The effect is named after Gurgen Askaryan, a Soviet-Armenian physicist who postulated it in 1962.

The radiation was first observed experimentally in 2000, 38 years after its theoretical prediction. So far the effect has been observed in silica sand, rock salt, ice, and Earth's atmosphere.

The effect is of primary interest in using bulk matter to detect ultra-high energy neutrinos. The Antarctic Impulse Transient Antenna (ANITA) experiment uses antennas attached to a balloon flying over Antarctica to detect the Askaryan radiation produced by showers of particles when cosmic neutrinos interact in the ice. Several experiments have also used the Moon as a neutrino detector based on detection of the Askaryan radiation.

The Askaryan Radio Array was an experiment located near the South Pole that operated in 2012–2018, and was used to detect neutrino-induced Askaryan radiation.

== See also ==
- Cherenkov radiation
- Lunar Orbital Radio Detector
