= KM3NeT =

European undersea neutrino detector

The KM3NeT LOM (Launching vehicle of Optical Modules) being loaded onto the RV Pelagia deployment vessel. A full string detection is rolled onto the LOM. After arrival at the seabed the string is unrolled to its full length.

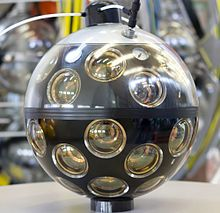
KM3NeT Digital Optical Module (DOM) in the laboratory

The Cubic Kilometre Neutrino Telescope, or KM3NeT, is a European research infrastructure located on the bed of the Mediterranean Sea at depths of over 2 kilometres. It hosts water Cherenkov neutrino telescopes designed to detect and study neutrinos from distant astrophysical sources as well as from our own atmosphere, contributing significantly to both astrophysics and particle physics knowledge.

Arrays of thousands of optical sensor modules detect the faint Cherenkov light in the deep sea from charged particles originating from interactions of neutrinos in water or rock in the vicinity of the detector. The position and direction of the optical modules and the time of arrival of the light on the photomultipliers inside are recorded with high precision. Properties of the particles, like their trajectory and energy, are reconstructed from these measurements.

== Background ==
The KM3NeT project foresees the construction of several of these detectors in the depths of the Mediterranean Sea along the southern coasts of Europe: KM3NeT-Fr (offshore Toulon, France) houses the ORCA (Oscillation Research with Cosmics in the Abyss) detector, and KM3NeT-It (offshore Portopalo di Capo Passero, Sicily, Italy) houses the ARCA (Astroparticle Research with Cosmics in the Abyss) detector. Both detectors are collecting data. KM3NeT-Gr (offshore Pylos, Peloponnese, Greece) will expand the KM3NeT Research Infrastructure in a next phase. The KM3NeT project continues the work done by the ANTARES neutrino telescope, which operated off the coast of France between 2008 and 2022.

The oversight, governance and management of the implementation and operation of KM3NeT is conducted by an international collaboration with many institutions all over the world being involved. The KM3NeT community consists of about 360 scientists, along with engineers and technicians.

== Scientific goals ==
The main objectives of the KM3NeT Collaboration are as follows:

1. The discovery and subsequent observation of high-energy neutrino sources in the universe, probing a wide variety of cosmic objects such as supernova remnants, gamma-ray bursts, supernovae and colliding stars. By identifying neutrinos from these sources, KM3NeT aims to provide insight into the origins of cosmic rays and the mechanisms driving some of the most extreme events in the universe.
2. In-depth investigations of fundamental neutrino properties, particularly neutrino oscillations, especially to determine the neutrino mass ordering by measuring the oscillations of atmospheric neutrinos. The ability to distinguish between different neutrino mass states will provide crucial information about the nature of neutrinos and their role in the Standard Model of particle physics.

In addition to these primary scientific goals, the telescope is a powerful tool in the search for dark matter in the universe. Furthermore, the research infrastructure houses instrumentation for other sciences like marine biology, oceanography and geophysics for long-term and real-time monitoring of the deep-sea environment and the sea bottom at depths of several kilometres.

The ARCA detector is the cubic kilometre-sized telescope searching for neutrino sources in the cosmos. The ORCA detector is optimised for the measurement of neutrino properties, and thus for investigating questions related to particle physics.

== Design ==
The infrastructures in France and Italy are designed to consist of almost 200 000 light sensors (photomultiplier tubes, or PMTs) distributed in three so-called building blocks: two for KM3NeT/ARCA and one for KM3NeT/ORCA. A building block comprises 115 flexible vertical strings - or detection units (DUs) - anchored at the seabed. Each string supports 18 pressure-resistant spherical sensor modules and each optical module comprises 31 photomultiplier tubes. Each building block thus constitutes a three-dimensional array of photo sensors that can be used to detect the Cherenkov light produced when relativistic particles emerging from neutrino interactions travel through sea water.

The KM3NeT-It site (36°16′N 16°06′E) hosting the ARCA detector is at a depth of 3500 m. It is optimised for the detection of high-energy cosmic neutrinos in the TeV–PeV range by widely spacing the optical modules: the 18 modules are approximately equally spaced on strings that are about 700 m long, and spaced about 90 m apart.

The KM3NeT-Fr site (42°48′N 06°02′E) hosting the ORCA detector is at a depth of 2450 m. The more closely spaced optical modules make the ORCA detector optimised for the detection of neutrinos in the GeV range. ORCA will consist of 115 strings in a 20 m triangular grid, with a 9 m spacing between the optical modules in a string. Overall, the array is about 210 m in diameter, and the strings are 200 m long.

The position of the modules and the time of arrival of light on the photomultipliers inside are measured with high precision. Each optical module is about 44 centimetres (17 in) in diameter, contains 31 three-inch photomultiplier tubes with supporting electronics, and is connected to shore via a high-bandwidth optical network. Via an electro-optical network of cables and junction boxes on the sea floor the optical modules are connected to control stations on shore for electrical power, for detector control and for data transmission.

Since the strings with optical modules move with the currents in the deep sea, the position and orientation of the optical modules and thus of the photomultiplier tubes inside is dynamically monitored using an acoustic system and a compass system, respectively. In each optical module controlled LED pulsers are used for time calibration.

At the shore of each KM3NeT installation site, a farm of computers performs the first data filter, prior to streaming the data to a central KM3NeT data centre for storage and further analysis by the KM3NeT scientists.

The construction and deployment of many of the detector pieces are illustrated in multiple videos.

== Construction history ==
The design of the KM3NeT neutrino telescope is very modular and construction is phased in time. In 2012, the implementation of the KM3NeT research facility started with the construction of the seabed infrastructures at the KM3NeT-Fr and KM3NeT-It sites. A prototype KM3NeT optical module took data successfully during about a year in 2013–2014 as part of the ANTARES telescope. At the KM3NeT-It site a prototype string took data in 2014–2015, also during about one year. The second phase of construction comprises the completion of the ARCA and ORCA detectors at the KM3NeT-It and KM3NeT-Fr sites, respectively. Between 2017 and 2026, 38 detection lines have been installed at the ORCA site, compared to 62 detection lines at the ARCA site.

== Scientific results ==
With the partial detector configurations the KM3NeT collaboration has already published results in peer-reviewed scientific journals, among which are:

With only six lines of the ORCA detector, the atmospheric oscillation parameters were measured to be sin^{2}(θ_{23}) = 0.51+0.04
−0.05, and ∆m^{2}_{31} = 2.18+0.25
−0.35 × 10^{−3} eV^{2} $\cup$ { -2.25, -1.76 } × 10^{−3} eV^{2} at 68% CL.

A search for neutrino counterparts was performed with KM3NeT data for the third observing run of the LIGO and Virgo gravitational wave interferometers in 2019–2020. Both searches yielded no significant excess for the sources in the gravitational wave catalogs. For each source, upper limits on the neutrino flux and on the total energy emitted in neutrinos in the respective energy ranges have been set. Stacking analyses of binary black hole mergers and neutron star-black hole mergers have also been performed to constrain the characteristic neutrino emission from these categories.

With both 10 lines of ORCA, and 21 lines of ARCA installed, a follow-up study has been performed for the extraordinarily bright transient phenomenon detected by the Gamma-Ray Burst Monitor on October 9, 2022, by the Fermi satellite. No candidate neutrino events were found in coincidence with the gamma-ray burst location. Upper limits on the neutrino emission associated were presented.

Many more studies have been published on: invisible neutrino decay, sterile neutrinos, non-standard neutrino interactions, searches for dark matter, quantum decoherence in neutrino oscillations, atmospheric muons, diffuse neutrino flux, point-like source emission, Starburst Galaxies, core collapse supernova, and combined analyses with other experiments like JUNO and CTA.

Furthermore, based on detailed Monte Carlo simulations, prospects of the KM3NeT detectors for ORCA as well as ARCA are presented in for example publications: A complete list of KM3NET scientific and technical papers can be found on INSPIRE-HEP. KM3NeT is committed to Open Access publication.

In 2025, researchers using the KM3NeT/ORCA detector began investigating quantum gravity by studying neutrino oscillations. The study aimed to detect signs of decoherence, a potential effect of quantum gravity. However, no evidence of decoherence was found, setting new upper limits on the strength of such effects, yet this research helped advance the search for quantum gravity, using neutrinos as a tool to explore the connection between quantum mechanics and gravity.

== Detection of ultra-high-energy neutrino event KM3-230213A ==
An extremely-high-energy muon traversing the ARCA detector at the KM3NeT-It site was observed on February 13, 2023 at 01:16:47 UTC. The event is referred to as KM3-230213A. At the time of observation, 21 detection lines of ARCA were in operation. The muon trajectory was reconstructed from the measured times and positions of the first hits recorded on the photomultiplier tubes in the optical modules.

The direction of KM3-230213A is reconstructed as near-horizontal, 0.6 degrees above the horizon. The measured muon energy is 120 petaelectronvolts (PeV) with an uncertainty of +110 PeV to −60 PeV. Given the enormously high energy and its near-horizon direction, the muon most likely originated from the interaction of a cosmic neutrino of even higher energy in the vicinity of the detector. The energy of the neutrino that produces such muons in the ARCA detector is estimated at 220 PeV (0.035 J). KM3-230213A is the highest-energy neutrino event observed so far.

The enormous energy suggested that the neutrino may have originated in a different cosmic accelerator than lower-energy neutrinos, or that this might be the first detection of a cosmogenic neutrino, from the interactions of ultra-high-energy cosmic rays with background photons in the Universe, or from the evaporation of a primordial black hole. The event may also provide evidence of sterile neutrinos.

== Relation with the European institutions ==
In 2006 KM3NeT was included in the European Strategy Forum on Research Infrastructure (ESFRI) roadmap, which recognises as a priority the KM3NeT research infrastructure for Europe's scientific needs for the next 10–20 years. The support was renewed by the Council of the European Union for the 2019–2026 period, allowing for example to launch the KM3NeT-INFRADEV2 project (2023–2025) for the full implementation of the KM3NeT research infrastructure.

KM3NeT has benefited from various funding through the European research and innovation programmes, including Horizon 2020 and Horizon Europe. Along with this, the implementation of KM3NeT installation sites also benefited from funding through the European Regional Development Fund (ERDF), confirming the economic, social and territorial potential of KM3NeT at regional level.

KM3NeT participated in many European projects, led by partners of the Collaboration. KM3NeT takes part in the EMSO network, by providing long-term access for Earth and Sea sciences research. KM3NeT participated in the ASTERICS project, and is still participating in the EOSC European initiative for Open Science as well as in the related ESCAPE project. KM3NeT is also engaged in citizen science, through the REINFORCE project.

== Global Neutrino Network ==
Together with Baikal, IceCube, P-ONE, and RNO-G, (and formerly ANTARES), KM3NeT is part of the Global Neutrino Network.
