= Radio Ice Cherenkov Experiment =

South Pole experiment designed to detect the Cherenkov emission

Radio Ice Cherenkov Experiment (RICE) was an experiment designed to detect the Cherenkov emission in the radio regime of the electromagnetic spectrum from the interaction of high energy neutrinos (greater than 1 PeV, so-called ultra-high energy UHE neutrinos) with the Antarctic ice cap (ice molecules). The goals of this experiment are to determine the potential of the radio-detection technique for measuring the high energy cosmic neutrino flux, determining the sources of this flux, and measuring neutrino-nucleon cross sections at energies above those accessible with existing accelerators. Such an experiment also has sensitivity to neutrinos from gamma ray bursts, as well as highly ionizing charged particles (monopoles, e.g.) traversing the Antarctic icecap.

The experiment operated 1999-2012 (prototypes before 1999, data-taking 1999-2010). The experiment's radio receivers were located 100–350 meters deep under the ice-sheet directly below the Martin A. Pomerantz Observatory (MAPO) at the South Pole Station. The MAPO-building housed the experiment's hardware. The drill holes housing the radio receivers were primarily drilled for the AMANDA and later (AMANDA was shut down 2009) IceCube experiments; RICE used the holes as a secondary experiment.

== Experimental operation and results ==
Two antennas were installed successfully during the 1995–96 austral summer. During the 1996–97 season, a prototype array of three antennas was deployed down the (AMANDA) bore holes at depths from 140–210 meters. This prototype demonstrated the ability to successfully deploy receivers and transmitters and enabled an estimate of the noise temperature in the deep ice. Several more receivers and transmitters were deployed in three new AMANDA holes during the 1997–1998 season, in dedicated (specifically drilled for RICE) shallow "dry" holes during the 1998–99 season, and finally in several AMANDA holes drilled during the 1999–2000 season. Five years of data-taking (two years of livetime) resulted in the most stringent upper limits on the neutrino flux in the interval 50 PeV – 1 EeV, as well as results on departures from Standard Model cross-sections and searches for gamma-ray burst coincidences. Currently, RICE hardware is being modified for use in the IceCube boreholes being drilled from 2006 to 2010.

In 2008-2009, the RICE experiment was extended into the Neutrino Array Radio Calibration (NARC) experiment. The continued experiment is known as RICE/NARC or just RICE.

In 2012, the results of the full dataset (collected 2000-2010) of RICE (RICE/NARC) were published and the RICE (RICE/NARC) experiment was described as "presently at the end of useful data-taking." No ultra-high energy (UHE) neutrinos were detected; this is in accordance with theoretic expectation.

The radio Cherenkov technique of detecting neutrinos is continued by RICE's successor experiment, Askaryan Radio Array (ARA), to which RICE hardware (and some of the researchers) was transferred. ARA is also deployed at the South Pole Station under ice. First ARA prototype was tested in South Pole in the Antarctic summer of 2010-2011.

== See also ==
- Neutrino telescope
