= Antarctic Impulsive Transient Antenna =

Experiment to study ultra-high-energy cosmic neutrinos

The Antarctic Impulsive Transient Antenna (ANITA) experiment has been designed to study ultra-high-energy (UHE) cosmic neutrinos by detecting the radio pulses emitted by their interactions with the Antarctic ice sheet. This is to be accomplished using an array of radio antennas suspended from a helium balloon flying at a height of about 37,000 meters.

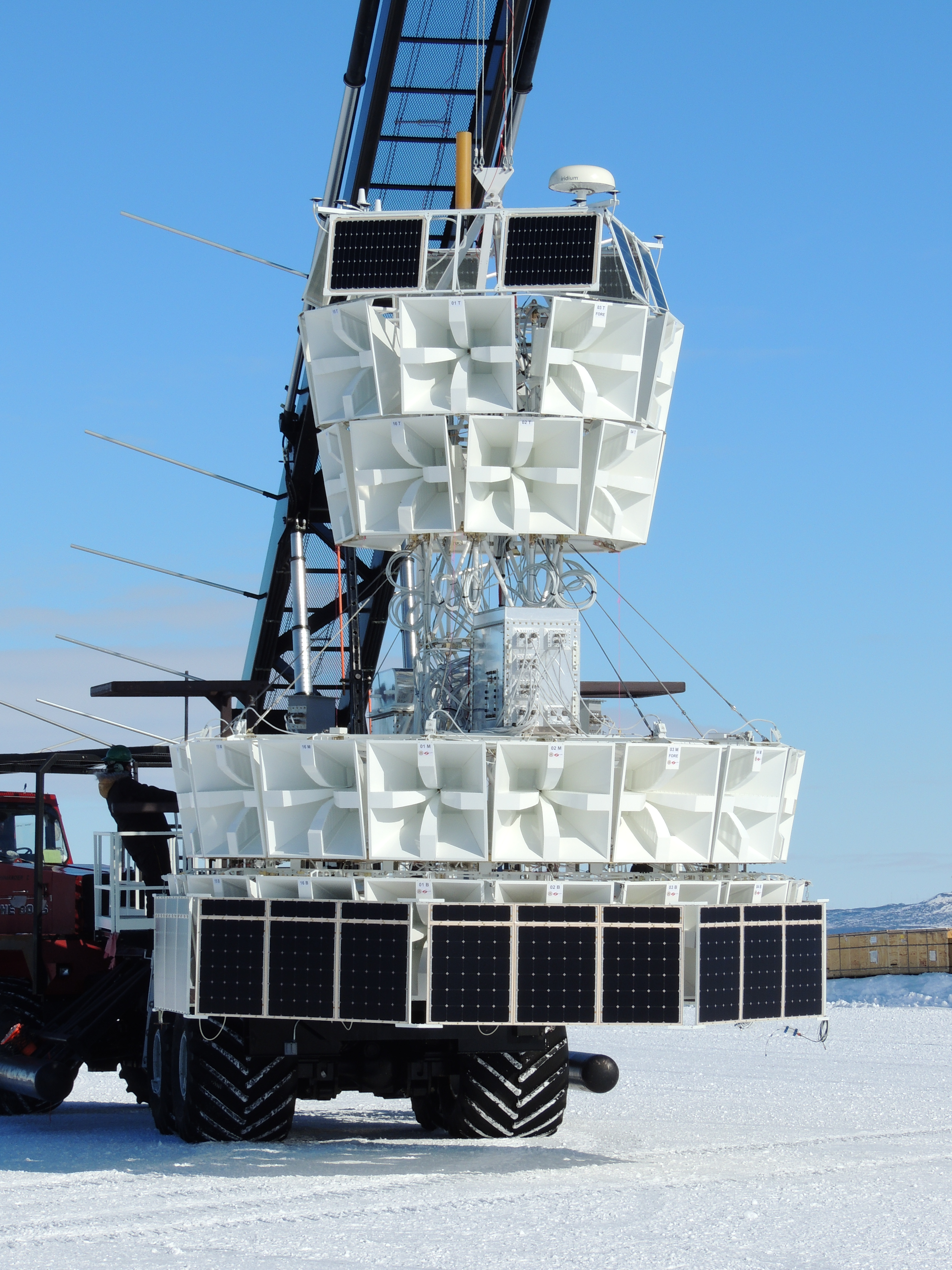
The ANITA-IV experiment in Antarctica, prior to being launched on a balloon.

The neutrinos, with energies on the order of 10^{18} eV, produce radio pulses in the ice because of the Askaryan effect. It is thought that these high-energy cosmic neutrinos result from interaction of ultra-high-energy (10^{20} eV) cosmic rays with the photons of the cosmic microwave background radiation. It is thus hoped that the ANITA experiment can help to explain the origin of these cosmic rays.

== Experimental time frame ==
ANITA-I launched from McMurdo, Antarctica in the summer of 2006–07. The array should travel around the continent with the circumpolar winds for approximately a month before being recovered by the CSBF. Each successive mission (if funded) would be at two-year intervals. ANITA-II, a modified instrument with 40 antennas, launched from McMurdo Station in the summer of 2008–2009. ANITA-III, expected to improve sensitivity by a factor of 5–10, launched in December 2014.

ANITA-IV launched in December 2016, with a lighter overall build, tunable notch filters and an improved trigger system.

== Funding ==
ANITA is a collaboration of multiple universities, led by UH Manoa and funded through grants by NASA and the U.S. Department of Energy.

== Results ==
ANITA flew four times between 2006 and 2016 and set the most competitive limits on the ultrahigh-energy diffuse neutrino flux above several tens of exa-electronvolt (EeV). In addition to its constraints on the diffuse neutrino flux, each ANITA flight has observed dozens of ultrahigh-energy cosmic rays via the geomagnetic radio emission from cosmic-ray-induced extensive air showers which ANITA typically observes in reflection off the surface of the ice.

ANITA-I and ANITA-III also each detected anomalous radio signatures that were observationally consistent with upcoming extensive air showers emerging from the surface. Upcoming extensive air showers are predicted to be created by the decay of upcoming tau leptons generated via incident tau neutrinos during their propagation through the Earth. However, the angles at which these events were observed are in tension with Standard Model neutrino properties as the Earth should strongly attenuate the neutrino flux at these steep emergence angles. A follow-up study by the IceCube experiment, which searches for neutrinos with significantly less energy than ANITA, could not detect any significant source of neutrinos from the location of these events. As of 2016, these events remain unexplained.

The fourth flight of ANITA, ANITA-IV, also detected four events that were observationally consistent with upcoming tau-induced extensive air showers. Unlike the events from ANITA-I and ANITA-III that were observed at steep angles below the horizon, the ANITA-IV events were observed very close to the horizon where tau-induced events are most likely to occur.

== Collaborators ==
The current ANITA collaboration team includes members from the University of Hawaii at Manoa; University of California, Los Angeles; Ohio State University; The University of Delaware; The University of Kansas; Washington University in St. Louis; the NASA Jet Propulsion Laboratory; University College London; University of Chicago; National Taiwan University; and the California Polytechnic State University.

== See also ==
- IceCube Neutrino Observatory
- Radio Ice Cerenkov Experiment
- Neutrino telescope
- Encounters at the End of the World
