= Baikal Deep Underwater Neutrino Telescope =

Observatory in Lake Baikal, Siberia

- Alternative names: BDUNT
- Organization: Joint Institute for Nuclear Research, Russian Academy of Sciences
- Location: Lake Baikal
- Coordinates: 51°45′54″N 104°24′54″E
- Established: 1990
- Website: baikalgvd.jinr.ru

Telescopes
- Telescope: Neutrino
- Location within Russia

The Baikal Deep Underwater Neutrino Telescope (BDUNT) (Russian: Байкальский подводный нейтринный телескоп) is a neutrino detector conducting research below the surface of Lake Baikal (Russia) since 2003. The first detector was started in 1990 and completed in 1998. It was upgraded in 2005 and again starting in 2015 to build the Baikal Gigaton Volume Detector (Baikal-GVD). BDUNT has studied neutrinos coming through the Earth with results on atmospheric muon flux. BDUNT picks up many atmospheric neutrinos created by cosmic rays interacting with the atmosphere – as opposed to cosmic neutrinos which give clues to cosmic events and are therefore of greater interest to physicists.

== Detector history ==
The start of the Baikal neutrino experiment dates back to 1 October 1980, when a laboratory of high-energy neutrino astrophysics was established at the Institute for Nuclear Research of the former Academy of Sciences of the USSR in Moscow. This laboratory would become the core of the Baikal collaboration.

The original NT-200 design was deployed in stages 3.6 km from shore at a depth of 1.1 km.

The first part, NT-36 with 36 optical modules (OMs) at 3 short strings, was put into operation and took data up to March 1995. NT-72 ran 1995–1996 then was replaced by the four-string NT-96 array. Over its 700 days of operation, 320,000,000 muon events were collected with NT-36, NT-72, and NT-96. Beginning April 1997, NT-144, a six-string array took data. The full NT-200 array with 192 modules was completed April 1998. In 2004–2005 it was updated to NT-200+ with three additional strings around NT-200 at distance of 100 meters, each with 12 modules.

=== Baikal-GVD ===
Since 2016, a 1 cubic km telescope, NT-1000 or Baikal-GVD (or just GVD, Gigaton Volume Detector), is being built. The first stage of 3 strings was switched on in April 2013. During 2015 the GVD demonstration cluster (also known as Dubna) with 192 optical modules was successfully operated. This concluded the preparatory phase of the project. In 2016 the construction of the first phase of the telescope began with the demonstration cluster being upgraded to the baseline configuration for a single cluster, with 288 OMs on eight vertical strings. The first phase of the telescope, when completed, was expected to contain 8 such clusters. This first phase was expected to be completed around 2020.

As of 2018, the Baikal telescope continued to operate and to be developed.

On 13 March 2021, the first phase of the telescope, GVD-I, was completed. It consisted of 8 clusters of 288 OMs each, and had a volume of about half a cubic kilometre. In the years to come the telescope will be expanded to measure one cubic kilometre (the full planned size). The project's cost (for the GVD-I phase) was about 2.5 billion Russian rubles (about 34 million US$).

== Results ==
BDUNT has used its neutrino detector to study astrophysical phenomena. Searches for relic dark matter in the Sun,, high-energy muons and neutrinos have been published.

== See also ==
- Baksan Neutrino Observatory
