= IceCube Neutrino Observatory =

Neutrino detector at the South Pole

- IceCube Neutrino Observatory at the South Pole
- Alternative names: IceCube Laboratory
- Organization: IceCube collaboration
- Location: Amundsen–Scott South Pole Station
- Coordinates: 89°59′24″S 63°27′11″W
- Website: icecube.wisc.edu

Telescopes
- Telescope: Neutrino
- Location within Antarctica
- Related media on Commons

The IceCube Neutrino Observatory (or simply IceCube) is a neutrino observatory developed by the University of Wisconsin–Madison and constructed at the Amundsen–Scott South Pole Station in Antarctica. The project is a recognized CERN experiment (RE10). Its thousands of sensors are located under the Antarctic ice in a glacier, distributed over a cubic kilometer.

Similar to its predecessor, the Antarctic Muon and Neutrino Detector Array (AMANDA), IceCube consists of spherical optical sensors called digital optical modules (DOMs), each with a photomultiplier tube (PMT) and a single-board data acquisition computer which sends digital data to the counting house on the surface above the array.

DOMs are deployed on strings of 60 modules each at depths between 1,450 and 2,450 meters into holes melted in the ice using a hot water drill. IceCube is designed to look for point sources of neutrinos in the teraelectronvolt (TeV) range to explore the highest-energy astrophysical processes.

IceCube was completed on 18 December 2010. An upgrade for IceCube observatory was approved in 2019 and was announced on 12 February 2026 to have been successfully deployed, marking its first significant expansion since commencement 15 years earlier.

In 2026, Francis Halzen, the principal investigator of the project, was awarded the Nobel Prize in Physics "for decisive contributions to the IceCube Neutrino Observatory and the discovery of high-energy neutrinos of astrophysical origin."

== Construction ==
IceCube is part of a series of projects developed and supervised by the University of Wisconsin–Madison. Collaboration and funding are provided by numerous other universities and research institutions worldwide. Construction of IceCube was only possible during the Antarctic austral summer from November to February, when permanent sunlight allowed for 24-hour drilling. Construction began in 2005, when the first IceCube string was deployed and sufficient data was collected to verify that the optical sensors functioned correctly. In the 2005–2006 season, an additional eight strings were deployed, making IceCube the largest neutrino telescope in the world.

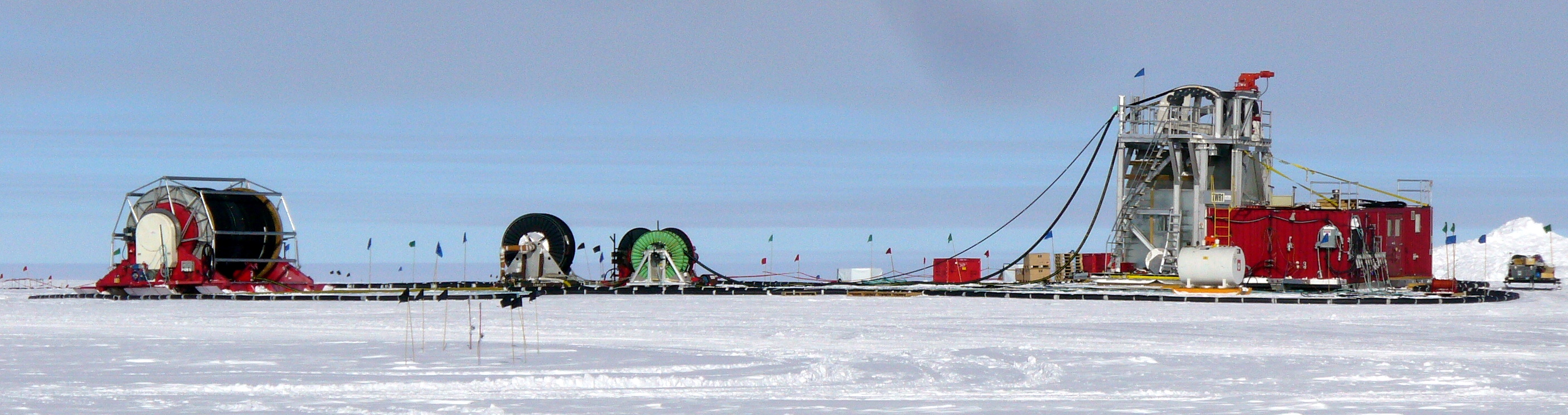
IceCube drilling tower and hose reel in December 2009

Season	Strings installed	Total strings
2005	1	1
2005–2006	8	9
2006–2007	13	22
2007–2008	18	40
2008–2009	19	59
2009–2010	20	79
2010	7	86
2023-2026	5	91

Construction was completed on 17 December 2010. The total cost of the project was $279 million.

IceCube's first upgrade since 2010, completed in February 2026, added five more closely-spaced and denser instrumented strings of light sensors at bottom center of the 86 existing strings, increasing the count of sensors already embedded in the ice by additional 600+ newer enhanced sensors and calibration instruments. Two new types of light sensors, the multi-PMT digital optical module (mDOM) and the "Dual optical sensors in an Ellipsoid Glass for Gen2," (D-Egg), having two to three times more sensitivity than existing sensors, were added during the upgrade. In addition, two seismometers were deployed beneath the Antarctic ice, making them the deepest in the world.

The 2026 IceCube upgrade is labelled as "a stepping stone" to a future IceCube-Gen2, which if built would enhance the observatory instrumentation by a factor of eight. As of 2026, plans for further upgrades to the array are in the federal approval process. If approved, the detectors for IceCube-Gen2 will each be eight times the size of those already emplaced. The observatory will be able both to detect more sources of particles and to discern their properties more finely at both lower and higher energy levels.

== Sub-detectors ==
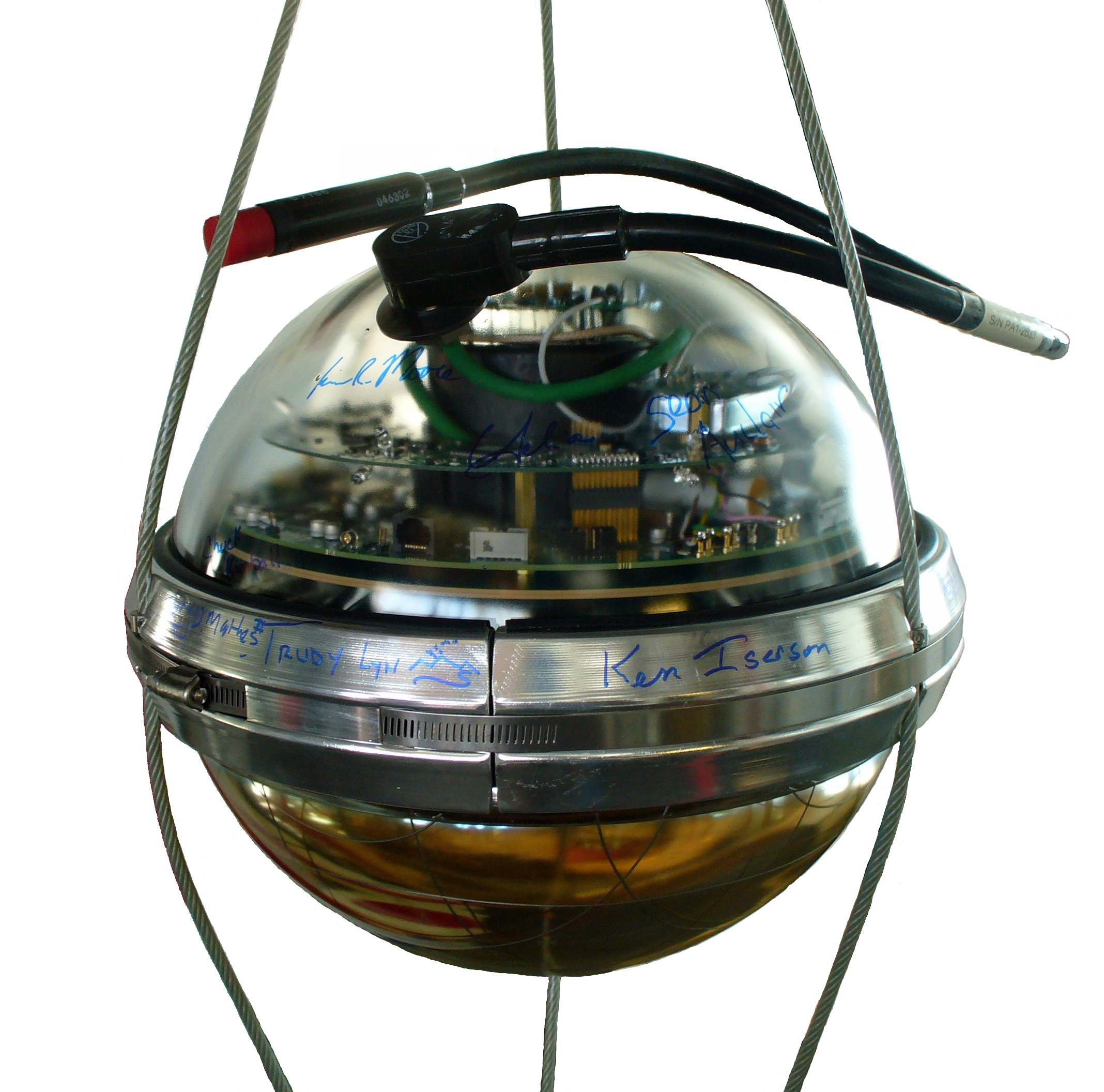
"Taklampa," one of the Digital Optical Modules of IceCube's hole #85

The IceCube Neutrino Observatory is composed of several sub-detectors in addition to the main in-ice array.

- AMANDA, the Antarctic Muon And Neutrino Detector Array, was the first part built and served as a proof-of-concept for IceCube. AMANDA was turned off in May 2009.
- The IceTop array is a series of Cherenkov detectors on the surface of the glacier, with two detectors approximately above each IceCube string. IceTop is used as a cosmic ray shower detector, for cosmic ray composition studies and coincident event tests: if a muon is observed going through IceTop, it cannot be from a neutrino interacting in the ice.
- The Deep Core Low-Energy Extension is a densely instrumented region of the IceCube array which extends the observable energies below 100 GeV. The Deep Core strings are deployed at the center (in the surface plane) of the larger array, deep in the clearest ice at the bottom of the array (between 1760 and 2450 m deep). There are no Deep Core DOMs between 1850 and 2107 m depth, as the ice is not as clear in those layers.

PINGU (Precision IceCube Next Generation Upgrade) is a proposed extension that would allow detection of low energy neutrinos (GeV energy scale), with uses including determining the neutrino mass hierarchy, precision measurement of atmospheric neutrino oscillation (both tau neutrino appearance and muon neutrino disappearance), and searching for weakly interacting massive particle (WIMP) annihilation in the Sun. A vision has also been presented for a larger observatory, IceCube-Gen2.

== Experimental mechanism ==
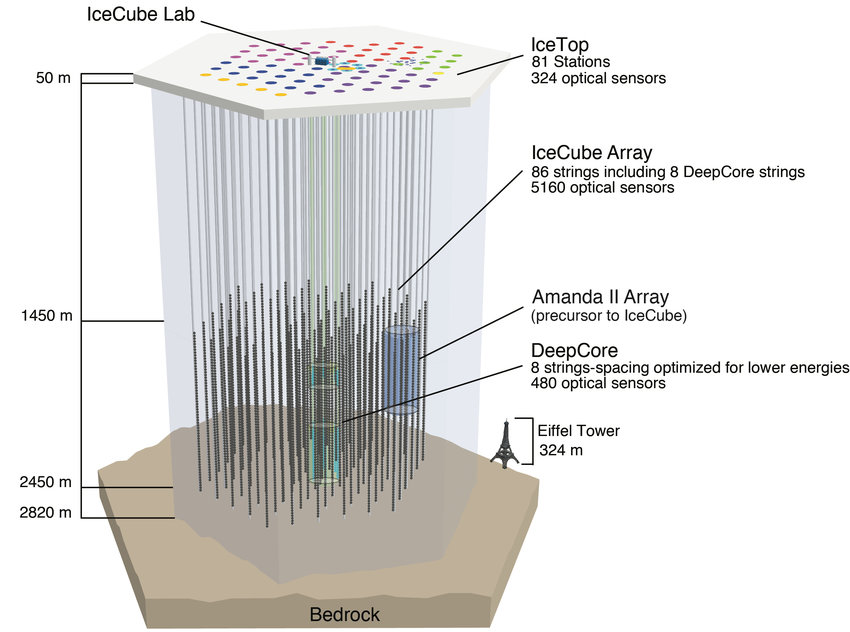
Three dimensional layout of the neutrino detector

Neutrinos are electrically neutral leptons, and interact only very rarely with matter through the weak force. When they do react with the molecules of water in the ice via the charged current interaction, they create charged leptons (electrons, muons, or taus) corresponding to the flavor of the neutrino. These charged leptons can, if they are energetic enough, emit Cherenkov radiation. This happens when the charged particle travels through the ice faster than the speed of light in the ice, similar to the shock wave of an airplane traveling faster than the speed of sound. This light can then be detected by photomultiplier tubes within the digital optical modules making up IceCube.

The detector signatures of the three charged leptons are distinct, and as such it's possible to determine the neutrino flavor of charged current events. On the other hand if instead a neutrino scatters off the ice via the neutral current, the final state contains no information about the neutrino flavor since no charged lepton is created.

The signals from the PMTs are digitized and then sent to the surface of the glacier on a cable. These signals are collected in a surface counting house, and some of them are sent to the outside world via satellite for further analysis. Since 2014, hard drives rather than tape store the balance of the data, which is sent out once a year via ship. Once the data reaches experimenters, they can reconstruct kinematical parameters of each incoming neutrino. High-energy neutrinos may cause a large signal in the detector, pointing back to their origin. Clusters of such neutrino directions indicate point sources of neutrinos.

Each of the above steps requires a certain minimum energy, and thus IceCube is sensitive mostly to high-energy neutrinos, in the range of 10^{7} to about 10^{21} eV.

IceCube is more sensitive to muons than other charged leptons, because they are the most penetrating and thus have the longest tracks in the detector. Thus, of the three neutrino flavors, IceCube is most sensitive to muon neutrinos. An electron resulting from an electron neutrino event typically scatters several times before losing enough energy to fall below the Cherenkov threshold; this means that electron neutrino events cannot typically be used to point back to sources, but they are more likely to be fully contained in the detector, and thus they can be useful for energy studies. These events are more spherical, or "cascade"-like, than "track"-like; muon neutrino events are more track-like.

Tau leptons can also create cascade events, but are short-lived and cannot travel very far before decaying, and are thus usually indistinguishable from electron cascades. A tau could be distinguished from an electron with a "double bang" event, where a cascade is seen both at the tau creation and decay. This is only possible with very high energy taus. Hypothetically, to resolve a tau track, the tau would need to travel at least from one DOM to an adjacent DOM (17 m) before decaying. As the average lifetime of a tau is 2.9×10^{−13} s, a tau traveling near the speed of light would require 20 TeV of energy for every meter traveled. Realistically, an experimenter would need more space than just one DOM to the next to distinguish two cascades, so double bang searches are centered at peta-electronvolt (PeV) scale energies. Such searches are underway but have not so far isolated a double bang event from background events. Another way to detect lower-energy tau neutrinos is through the "double pulse" signature, where a single DOM detects two distinct light arrival times corresponding to the neutrino interaction and tau decay vertices. Machine learning (ML) techniques, such as Convolutional Neural Networks, are also used to distinguish the tau neutrino signal. In 2024, the IceCube collaboration published its findings of seven astrophysical tau neutrino candidates using such a technique.

There is a large background of muons created not by neutrinos from astrophysical sources but by cosmic rays impacting the atmosphere above the detector. There are about 10^{6} times more cosmic ray muons than neutrino-induced muons observed in IceCube. Most of these can be rejected using the fact that they are traveling downwards. Most of the remaining (up-going) events are from neutrinos, but most of these neutrinos are from cosmic rays hitting the far side of the Earth; some unknown fraction may come from astronomical sources, and these neutrinos are the key to IceCube point source searches. Estimates predict the detection of about 75 upgoing neutrinos per day in the fully constructed IceCube detector. The arrival directions of these astrophysical neutrinos define the area in which the IceCube telescope maps the sky. To distinguish these two types of neutrinos statistically, the direction and energy of the incoming neutrino is estimated from its collision by-products. Unexpected excesses in energy or excesses from a given spatial direction indicate an extraterrestrial source.

== Experimental goals ==
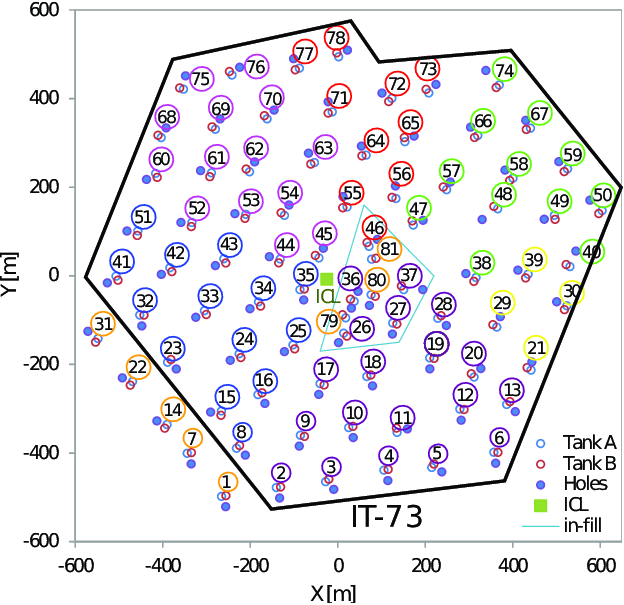
Top-view of the IceCube Neutrino Observatory. The IceCube-InIce strings and IceTop stations are separated by about 125 meters in a triangular grid pattern.

=== Point sources of high energy neutrinos ===
A point source of neutrinos could help explain the mystery of the origin of the highest energy cosmic rays. These cosmic rays have energies high enough that they cannot be contained by galactic magnetic fields (their gyroradii are larger than the radius of the galaxy), so they are believed to come from extra-galactic sources. Astrophysical events which are cataclysmic enough to create such high energy particles would probably also create high energy neutrinos, which could travel to the Earth with very little deflection because neutrinos interact so rarely. IceCube could observe these neutrinos: its observable energy range is about 100 GeV to several PeV. The more energetic an event is, the larger volume IceCube may detect it in; in this sense, IceCube is more similar to Cherenkov telescopes like the Pierre Auger Observatory (an array of Cherenkov detecting tanks) than it is to other neutrino experiments, such as Super-K (with inward-facing PMTs fixing the fiducial volume).

IceCube is more sensitive to point sources in the northern hemisphere than in the southern hemisphere. It can observe astrophysical neutrino signals from any direction, but neutrinos coming from the direction of the southern hemisphere are swamped by the cosmic-ray muon background. Thus, early IceCube point source searches focus on the northern hemisphere, and the extension to southern hemisphere point sources takes extra work.

Although IceCube detects very few neutrinos relative to the number of photons detected by more traditional telescopes, it has very high resolution with the ones that it does find. Over several years of operation, it could produce a flux map of the northern hemisphere similar to existing maps like that of the cosmic microwave background, or gamma ray telescopes, which use particle terminology more like IceCube. Likewise, KM3NeT could complete the map for the southern hemisphere.

IceCube scientists may have detected their first neutrinos on 29 January 2006.

=== Gamma-ray bursts coincident with neutrinos ===
When protons collide with one another or with photons, the result is usually pions. Charged pions decay into muons and muon neutrinos whereas neutral pions decay into gamma rays. Potentially, the neutrino flux and the gamma ray flux may coincide in certain sources such as gamma-ray bursts and supernova remnants, indicating the elusive nature of their origin. Data from IceCube is being used in conjunction with gamma-ray satellites like Swift and Fermi for this goal. IceCube has not observed any neutrinos in coincidence with gamma ray bursts, but is able to use this search to constrain neutrino flux to values less than those predicted by the current models.

=== Indirect dark matter searches ===
Weakly interacting massive particle (WIMP) dark matter could be gravitationally captured by massive objects like the Sun and accumulate in the core of the Sun. With a high enough density of these particles, they would annihilate with each other at a significant rate. The decay products of this annihilation could decay into neutrinos, which could be observed by IceCube as an excess of neutrinos from the direction of the Sun. This technique of looking for the decay products of WIMP annihilation is called indirect, as opposed to direct searches which look for dark matter interacting within a contained, instrumented volume. Solar WIMP searches are more sensitive to spin-dependent WIMP models than many direct searches, because the Sun is made of lighter elements than direct search detectors (e.g., xenon or germanium). IceCube has set better limits with the 22 string detector (about 1/4 of the full detector) than the AMANDA limits.

=== Neutrino oscillations ===
IceCube can observe neutrino oscillations from atmospheric cosmic ray showers, over a baseline across the Earth. It is most sensitive at ~25 GeV, the energy range for which the DeepCore sub-array has been optimized. DeepCore consists of 6 strings deployed in the 2009–2010 austral summer with a closer horizontal and vertical spacing. In 2014, DeepCore data was used to determine the mixing angle θ_{23} and mass splitting Δm^{2}_{23}. This measurement has since been improved with more data and improved detector calibration and data processing.

As more data is collected and IceCube measurements are refined further, it may be possible to observe the characteristic modification of the oscillation pattern at ~15 GeV that determines the neutrino mass hierarchy. This mechanism for determining the mass hierarchy only works as the mixing angle θ_{13} is large.

=== Galactic supernovae ===
Despite the fact that individual neutrinos expected from supernovae have energies well below the IceCube energy cutoff, IceCube could detect a local supernova. It would appear as a detector-wide, brief, correlated rise in noise rates. The supernova would have to be relatively close (within our galaxy) to get enough neutrinos before the 1/r^{2} distance dependence took over. IceCube is a member of the Supernova Early Warning System (SNEWS).

=== Sterile neutrinos ===
A signature of sterile neutrinos would be a distortion of the energy spectrum of atmospheric neutrinos around 1 TeV, for which IceCube is uniquely positioned to search. This signature would arise from matter effects as atmospheric neutrinos interact with the matter of the Earth.

The described detection strategy, along with its South Pole position, could allow the detector to provide the first robust experimental evidence of extra dimensions predicted in string theory. Many extensions of the Standard Model of particle physics, including string theory, propose a sterile neutrino; in string theory this is made from a closed string. These could leak into extra dimensions before returning, making them appear to travel faster than the speed of light. An experiment to test this may be possible in the near future. Furthermore, if high-energy neutrinos create microscopic black holes (as predicted by some aspects of string theory), they would create a shower of particles, resulting in an increase of "down" neutrinos while reducing "up" neutrinos.

In 2016, scientists at the IceCube detector did not find any evidence for the sterile neutrino.

== Results ==
The IceCube collaboration has published flux limits for neutrinos from point sources, gamma-ray bursts, and neutralino annihilation in the Sun, with implications for WIMP–proton cross section.

A shadowing effect from the Moon has been observed. Cosmic ray protons are blocked by the Moon, creating a deficit of cosmic ray shower muons in the direction of the Moon. A small (under 1%) but robust anisotropy has been observed in cosmic ray muons.

In November 2013 it was announced that IceCube had detected 28 neutrinos that likely originated outside the Solar System. and among those a pair of high energy neutrinos in the peta-electronvolt (PeV) range, making them the highest energy neutrinos discovered to date. The pair were nicknamed "Bert" and "Ernie", after characters from the Sesame Street TV show. Later in 2013, the number of detections increased to 37 candidates, including a new high-energy neutrino at 2000 TeV given the name "Big Bird", another Sesame Street character.

IceCube measured 10–100 GeV atmospheric muon neutrino disappearance in 2014, using three years of data taken May 2011 to April 2014, including DeepCore, determining neutrino oscillation parameters ∆m^{2}_{32} = 2.72+0.19
−0.20 × 10^{−3} eV^{2} and sin^{2}(θ_{23}) = 0.53+0.09
−0.12 (normal mass hierarchy), comparable to other results. The measurement was improved using more data in 2017, and in 2019 atmospheric tau neutrino appearance was measured. The latest measurement with improved detector calibration and data processing from 2023 has resulted in more precise values of the oscillation parameters, determining ∆m^{2}_{32} = (2.41 ± 0.07) × 10^{−3} eV^{2} and sin^{2}(θ_{23}) = 0.51 ± 0.05 (normal mass hierarchy).

In July 2018, the IceCube Neutrino Observatory announced that they had traced an extremely-high-energy neutrino that hit their detector in September 2017 back to its point of origin in the blazar TXS 0506 +056 located 3.7 billion light-years away in the direction of the constellation Orion; the results had a statistical significance of 3-3.5σ. This was the first time that a neutrino detector had been used to locate an object in space, and indicated that a source of cosmic rays had been identified.

In 2020, evidence of the Glashow resonance at 2.3σ (formation of the W boson in antineutrino-electron collisions) was announced.

In February 2021, the tidal disruption event (TDE) AT2019dsg was reported as candidate for a neutrino source, and AT2019fdr as a second TDE candidate in June 2022.

In November 2022, IceCube announced strong evidence of a neutrino source emitted by the active galactic nucleus of Messier 77. It is the second detection by IceCube after TXS 0506+056, and only the fourth known source including SN1987A and solar neutrinos. OKS 1424+240 and GB9 are other possible candidates.

In June 2023, IceCube identified, on a galactic map, the diffuse neutrino emission from the galactic plane at the 4.5σ level of significance.

On June 10, 2026, IceCube logged its first high-energy single-neutrino detection event tagged as gold (i.e., with ≥50% probability of being astrophysical) since the upgrade deployment in February 2026.

== See also ==
- Antarctic Muon And Neutrino Detector Array
- Radio Ice Cherenkov Experiment
- ANTARES and KM3NeT, similar neutrino telescopes using deep-sea water instead of ice.
- Multimessenger astronomy
- Francis Halzen
