= Soo-Bong Kim =

South Korean physicist (born 1960)

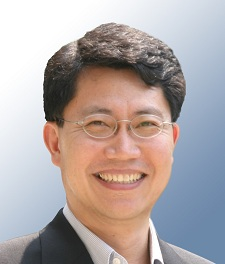
- Soo-Bong Kim
- Born: 1960 (age 65–66); Busan, South Korea
- Education: Seoul National University; University of Pennsylvania
- Known for: Discovery of neutrino oscillations and top quark
- Awards: Ho-Am Prize in Science (2020); Bruno Pontecorvo Prize (2016); 1st SNU Academic Research Excellence Prize (2006); Asahi Prize (1999); Bruno Rossi Prize (1989); Asahi Prize (1988)
- Scientific career
- Fields: Experimental Particle Physics
- Workplaces: Seoul National University
- Doctoral advisor: Alfred K. Mann

- Soo-Bong Kim
- Hangul: 김수봉
- RR: Gim Subong
- MR: Kim Subong

Soo-Bong Kim is a South Korean physicist.

== Education ==
Kim was born and raised in Busan, South Korea. He attended Dongrae High School, graduating in the class of 1979. Kim then graduated in 1983 and obtained his MS degree from Seoul National University. He received his Ph.D. from the University of Pennsylvania in 1989. Kim's Ph.D. thesis was supervised by Alfred K. Mann and resulted in real-time and directional measurement of solar neutrinos in the Kamiokande-II detector and search for short-time variation.

== Work ==
Kim was a postdoctoral fellow and a research investigator at the University of Michigan before moving to Boston University in 1996. He took up his current position at Seoul National University in 1998. He jointly led the efforts of discovering the top quark in 1994 and measuring its mass in 1995 using the Fermilab Tevatron hadron collider as a member of the CDF collaboration. The top quark was the heaviest fundamental fermion yet to be observed before the experiment. The observation and mass measurement of the particle opened a new field of "top quark physics".

Kim received his Ph.D. degree in 1989, based on the successful measurement of solar neutrinos using the Kamiokande-II detector, which confirmed the existence of the solar neutrino problem. He participated in the historical and first observation of neutrino burst from the Supernova 1987A and jointly discovered the neutrino oscillations using the Super-Kamiokande detector in 1998.

He then joined the effort of measuring neutrino oscillations using a neutrino beam produced by an accelerator. As a member of the K2K (KEK-to-Kamioka) collaboration in 2004, he measured one of the neutrino mixing angles.

Kim started construction of a neutrino detector facility, near a nuclear power plant in Korea, to measure the last unknown neutrino mixing angle in 2006, and completed it in early 2011. He has been leading data collection for the RENO experiment since August 1, 2011 using the facility.

== Awards ==
Kim and all the members of Kamiokande-II collaboration received Asahi Prize in 1988 and the American Astronomy Society's Bruno Rossi Prize in 1989 for the detection of a neutrino burst from the Supernova SN1987A. He shared the Asahi Prize in 1999 with Super-Kamiokande collaboration for the observation of atmospheric neutrino oscillation. In 2016, he shared the Bruno Pontecorvo Prize with Wang Yifang and Kōichirō Nishikawa.

Kim was selected as one of world highly cited 5,000 researchers (HCR) by the ISI. He won the 1st Seoul National University's Academic Research Excellence Prize in 2008. In 2014, Kim was given the Kyung-Ahm Prize for natural science and also the Samil Prize. In 2020, Kim was given the Ho-Am Prize in Science.

== Technical reports ==
- "Indication of Electron Neutrino Appearance from an Accelerator-produced Off-axis Muon Neutrino Beam", Physical Review Letters 107, 041801 (2011)

== See also ==
- Neutrino burst from SN1987A
