= Stanislav Mikheyev =

Russian physicist (1940–2011)

- Born: 1940; USSR
- Died: 23 April 2011 (aged 70–71)
- Citizenship: USSR, Russia
- Education: Moscow State University
- Known for: co-discovering of the Mikheyev–Smirnov–Wolfenstein effect
- Awards: Bruno Pontecorvo Prize; Sakurai Prize (2008)
- Scientific career
- Fields: Physicist
- Workplaces: Institute for Nuclear Research

Stanislav Pavlovich Mikheyev (Russian: Станисла́в Па́влович Михе́ев; 1940 – 23 April 2011) was a Russian physicist known for the discovery of the MSW effect.

== Education and research ==
Stanislav Mikheyev graduated from Faculty of Physics of Moscow State University in 1965. Then he became a researcher at Lebedev Physical Institute. Since 1970 he was a researcher at the Institute for Nuclear Research of the USSR Academy of Sciences (Russian Academy of Sciences since 1991), where he earned his Ph.D. in physics in 1983.

He worked on Baksan Underground Scintillator Telescope for a long time. He has been the leader of two experiments carried out on Baksan Telescope: observation of upward-going muons and searches for superheavy magnetic monopoles.

In 1985 Stanislav Mikheyev and Alexei Smirnov considered the propagation of oscillating neutrinos in matter with varying density and suggested an explanation for the solar neutrino problem (the MSW effect). From 1991 to 1998 Mikheyev worked on the MACRO detector. His activities were also related to the Baksan Neutrino Observatory, the Baikal Neutrino Telescope and the T2K experiment.

== Awards ==
Mikheyev was awarded the Bruno Pontecorvo Prize (2006, jointly with Smirnov and Wolfenstein) and the Sakurai Prize (2008, jointly with Smirnov).

== See also ==
- List of theoretical physicists
