= Bruno Pontecorvo Prize =

Particle physics award

The Bruno Pontecorvo Prize (Russian: Премия имени Бруно Понтекорво) is an award for elementary particle physics, established in 1995 by the JINR in Dubna to commemorate Bruno Pontecorvo. The prize is mainly given for neutrino physics, which was Pontecorvo's principal research field, and usually to a single scientist. It is offered internationally every year.

== Winners ==
Year	Name	Institution	Recognition	Notes
2021	Thomas K. Gaisser	University of Delaware, USA	for significant contributions to neutrino, astroparticle and high-energy cosmic ray physics, in particular to the atmospheric neutrino flux calculation from its early stage development	
2020	Kimio Niwa	Nagoya University, Japan	for the development of the high-resolution nuclear emulsion technique, which allowed identification of the tau neutrino and direct observation of tau neutrino oscillations.	
2019	Fabiola Gianotti	CERN	for the leading contribution to the experimental studies of fundamental interactions and discovery of the Higgs boson.	
2018	Francis Halzen	University of Wisconsin, Madison	for significant contribution to the IceCube detector construction and experimental discovery of high-energy astrophysical neutrinos	
2017	Gianluigi Fogli	University of Bari and INFN, Bari, Italy	for their pioneering contribution to the development of global analysis of neutrino oscillation data from different experiments	
2017	Eligio Lisi	INFN, Bari, Italy	for their pioneering contribution to the development of global analysis of neutrino oscillation data from different experiments	
2016	Wang Yifang	IHEP, Beijing, China	for his contribution to the Daya Bay experiment	
2016	Soo-Bong Kim	Seoul National University, South Korea	for his contribution to the RENO experiment	
2016	Kōichirō Nishikawa	KEK, Tsukuba, Japan	for his contribution to the T2K experiment	
2015	Gianpaolo Bellini	INFN, Frascati, Italy and University of Milan, Italy	for his outstanding contribution to the development of detection methods for low-energy neutrinos, their realization in the Borexino detector, and the important results on solar and geoneutrinos provided by the experiment	
2014	Grigory V. Domogatsky	INR, Moscow, Russia	for his outstanding contribution to the development of neutrino astronomy and the astrophysics of high-energy neutrinos; in particular, his pioneering work to develop a method for detecting high-energy neutrinos using an underwater detector and create an operational facility at the Baikal Deep Underwater Neutrino Telescope	
2013	Luciano Maiani	University of Rome, Italy	for outstanding contributions to the physics of elemental particles, in particular to the physics of weak interactions and neutrinos	
2012	Ettore Fiorini	University of Milan, Italy	for his outstanding contribution to the search for neutrino-free double beta decay	
2011	Stanley Wojcicki	Fermilab, IL and Stanford University, CA	for his outstanding contribution to the creation of the MINOS detector, for new results obtained in the field of particle physics and, especially, in the field of neutrino oscillations	
2010	Yōichirō Suzuki	Kamioka Observatory, Japan, and IPMU, Japan	for his contributions to the detection of atmospheric and solar neutrino oscillations in the Super Kamiokande collaboration	
2010	Sergey Petcov	SISSA, Trieste, and INFN, Trieste, Italy	for research on the understanding of the interactions of neutrinos with matter and the properties of Majorana neutrinos	
2009	Alexander D. Dolgov	ITEP, Moscow, Russia	for fundamental contributions to the understanding of neutrino oscillations and neutrino kinetics in cosmology	
2009	Henry W. Sobel	University of California, Irvine	for important contributions to the experimental study of neutrino oscillations	
2008	Valery Rubakov	INR, Moscow, Russia	for his essential contributions to the study of close interrelation among particle physics, astrophysics and cosmology, and to the elaboration of a fundamentally new theory of physical space	
2007	Antonino Zichichi	University of Bologna/INFN, Italy, and CERN, Geneva, Switzerland	for his fundamental contributions to the creation of the largest underground Gran Sasso National Laboratory and to the construction of large-scale facilities for experimental studies of solar and accelerator neutrinos	
2006	Atsuto Suzuki	KEK, Tsukuba, Japan	for the discovery of reactor antineutrino oscillations and detection of geoantineutrinos in the KamLAND experiment	
2005	Alexei Y. Smirnov; Stanislav P. Mikheyev; Lincoln Wolfenstein	ICTP, Trieste, Italy; INR, Moscow, Russia; Carnegie Mellon University, PA	for the prediction and study of matter effects on neutrino oscillations, known as the Mikheyev–Smirnov–Wolfenstein effect	
2004	Arthur B. McDonald	Queen's University, Kingston, Canada	for the evidence of solar neutrino oscillations in the SNO experiment at Sudbury Neutrino Observatory, Canada	
2003	Yōji Totsuka	KEK, Tsukuba, Japan	for his outstanding contribution to the discovery of atmospheric muon-neutrino oscillations	
2002	Samoil Mihelevich Bilenky	JINR, Dubna, Russia	for theoretical investigations of neutrino oscillations	
2001	Nicholas Samios	Brookhaven National Laboratory, NY	for contributions both as a researcher and as a scientific administrator; in particular, for the discovery of the phi meson and the omega minus hyperon	
2000	Vladimir Nikolaievich Gavrin	INR, Moscow, Russia	for their outstanding contributions to solar neutrino research using the gallium germanium method at the Baksan Neutrino Observatory	
2000	Georgiy Zatsepin	INR, Moscow, Russia	for their outstanding contributions to solar neutrino research using the gallium germanium method at the Baksan Neutrino Observatory	
1999	Raymond Davis	Brookhaven National Laboratory, NY	for his outstanding achievements in developing the chlorine-argon method for solar neutrino detection	
1998	Vladimir M. Lobashev	INR, Moscow, Russia	for contributions to the physics of weak interaction	
1997	Klaus Winter	CERN, Geneva, Switzerland	for his experimental research in the field of neutrino physics at accelerators	
1996	Lev Okun	ITEP, Moscow, Russia	for elementary particle physics	
1996	Semyon Gershtein	Moscow Institute of Physics and Technology	for theoretical research in the field of electroweak interactions	
1995	Ugo Amaldi	CERN, Geneva, Switzerland	for his significant contribution to studies in the physics of weak interactions	

== See also ==
- List of physics awards
