= Dornbracht =

German manufacturer of kitchen and bathroom fittings

Dornbracht GmbH & Co. KG
- Type: GmbH & Co. KG
- Industry: Sanitary
- Founded: 1950
- Founder: Aloys F. Dornbracht
- Headquarters: Iserlohn, Germany
- Key people: Olaf Hoppe (Managing Director)
- Number of employees: ca. 800 (2023)

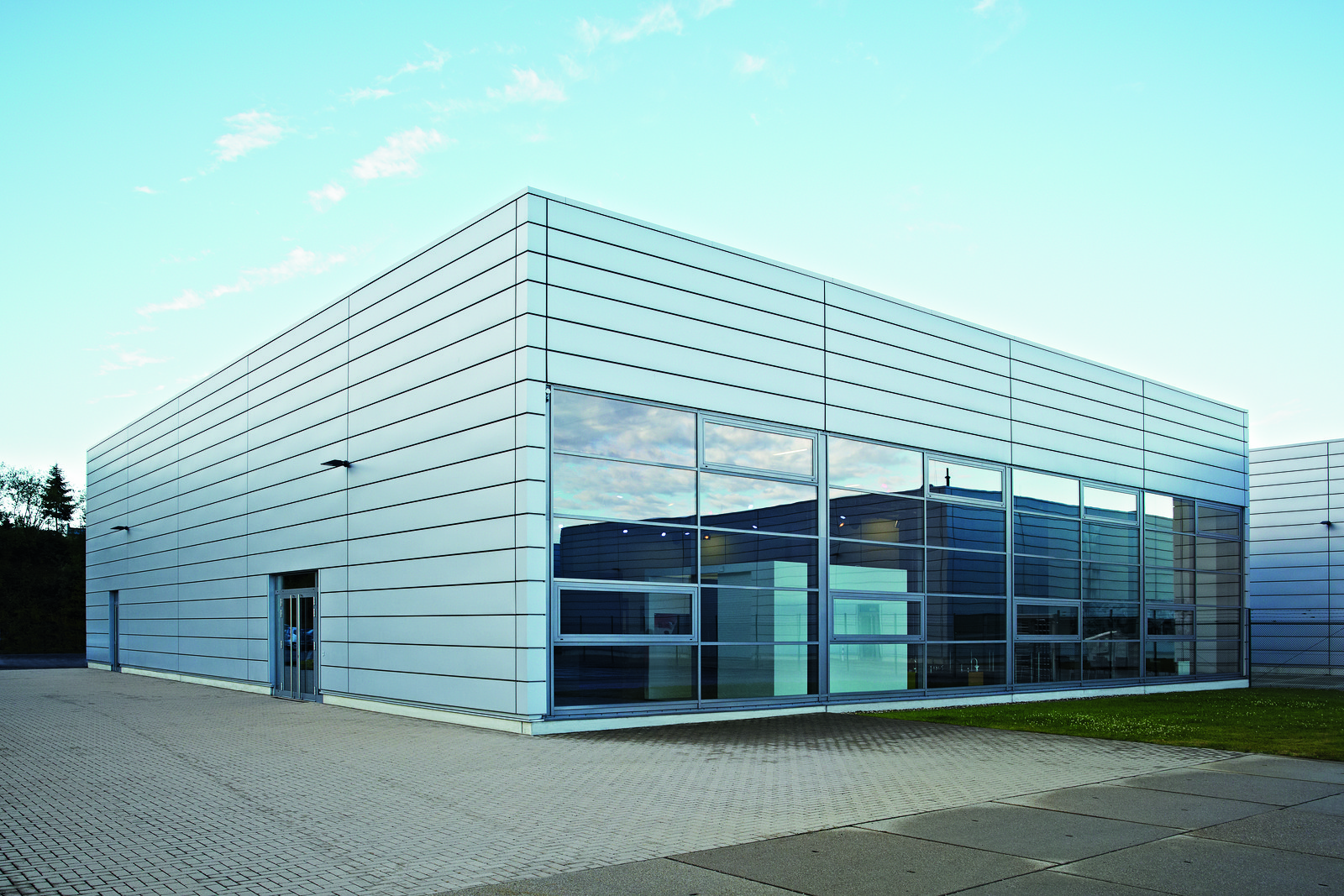
Dornbracht building in Iserlohn

Dornbracht GmbH & Co. KG is a German, medium-sized company that manufactures fittings and accessories for the bathroom, spa and kitchen. The company's headquarters are located in Iserlohn, South Westphalia. Alape GmbH, based in Goslar, Germany, was a subsidiary of Dornbracht AG & Co. KG.

== History ==
Dornbracht was founded in 1950 by Aloys F. Dornbracht (1893-1983) together with his son Helmut in Iserlohn. They invented the extendable spout, which was designed for use in large kitchens and allowed for the water to be directed above the stove towards the pots.

Dornbracht initially manufactured standard fittings for bathrooms under the Adia brand (Aloys Dornbracht Iserlohn Armaturen), but by the end of the 1960s the company had already launched the first fitting in the high-price segment with the development of the Edition 2000, which led to the Dornbracht brand specializing in high-quality design fittings in 1977.

In the 1980s, the Adia standard segment was abandoned and the company continued under the brand Dornbracht. In 1991, Helmut Dornbracht's sons Matthias and Andreas took over the management of the company.

In 2009, a major fire at an adjacent chemical plant caused damage to the Dornbracht factory accumulating to €140 million, which forced production to come to a standstill for several months and was followed by sales plummeting by 40 percent in that year.

In 2010, the European Commission fined Dornbracht €12,517,671 for their part in a price-fixing cartel of 17 companies which, "coordinated the sales price for bathroom fixtures and fittings in Germany, Austria, Italy, Belgium, France and the Netherlands" between 1992 and 2004.

In 2020, Dornbracht was transformed from a GmbH & Co. KG into Dornbracht AG & Co. KG. As part of this transformation, the majority shares were acquired by the Knauf entrepreneur family in Dortmund and a new management team was established.

At the end of 2024, the managing company Dornbracht Management AG was converted into a limited liability company. This also changes the legal form of the general partner and the name of the central operating company from Dornbracht AG & Co. KG to Dornbracht GmbH & Co. KG. Dornbracht thus continues to be a limited partnership. Managing Director is Olaf Hoppe.

== Company Structure ==
Dornbracht develops and manufactures products at its production site in Iserlohn, Southern Westphalia, and operates 15 sales offices worldwide. According to the company, 98% of the production material is purchased from the European market, 78% of which comes from the German market. Alape GmbH in Goslar, manufacturer of washbasins and washstands made of glazed steel, was a subsidiary of Dornbracht AG & Co. KG. Dornbracht was a licensee of Villeroy & Boch from 2001 until 2023.

== Products ==
Dornbracht manufactures bathroom fittings, spa applications and kitchen fittings. The bathroom products include fittings for washbasins, bathtubs, showers, WCs and bidets. The spa applications contain mostly showers and range from designer and rain showers to those with wellness applications. For the kitchen, Dornbracht offers kitchen fittings and kitchen sinks. The range includes pull-out, swivel and shower functions, among others.

== Sponsorships and art projects ==
Dornbracht initiated various cooperative ventures with visual and creative artists, especially in the 1990s and 2000s. In this context, various artists, musicians, authors, architects and designers created works on the themes of water, cleaning, rituals and culture in the bathroom. Those projects, most recently bundled under the title Culture Projects, included not only self-initiated projects but also sponsorships of exhibitions by contemporary artists in renowned museums, including the Guggenheim Museum and MoMA in New York City, the Neue Nationalgalerie in Berlin and the Museum für Moderne Kunst in Frankfurt am Main.

In addition, Dornbracht was the main sponsor of the German contribution to the Biennale di Venezia in 1999, 2001 and 2017. The artists sponsored were Rosemarie Trockel, Gregor Schneider and Anne Imhof.
