= Alfred Mann =

Alfred or Alf Mann may refer to:

- Alfred E. Mann (1925–2016), American entrepreneur and philanthropist
- Alfred Mann (musicologist) (1917–2006), academic and writer in musical theory
- Alfred K. Mann (1920–2013), particle physicist
- Alf Mann (rugby league), English rugby league player
