= Alexei Smirnov (physicist) =

Russian physicist (born 1951)

Alexei Yuryevich Smirnov
- Born: October 16, 1951 (age 74); Soviet Union
- Citizenship: Russian
- Education: Moscow State University
- Known for: Mikheyev–Smirnov–Wolfenstein effect
- Awards: Bruno Pontecorvo Prize (2005); Sakurai Prize (2008); Albert Einstein Medal (2016)
- Scientific career
- Fields: Physicist
- Workplaces: INR RAS, ICTP, Max Planck Institute for Nuclear Physics
- Doctoral students: Francesco Vissani, Cecilia Lunardini

Alexei Yuryevich Smirnov (Russian: Алексе́й Ю́рьевич Cмирно́в; born October 16, 1951) is a neutrino physics researcher and one of the discoverers of the MSW Effect.

== Education ==
Smirnov graduated from MSU Faculty of Physics of Moscow State University in 1974. In 1977, he began to work at the Institute for Nuclear Research (INR) of the Academy of Sciences of the USSR, where he received his Candidate of Sciences degree in 1979. In 1989, he received a degree of Doctor of Physical and Mathematical sciences. He also taught at the Faculty of Physics of Moscow State University in the period from 1982 to 1990.

Smirnov joined the International Centre for Theoretical Physics (ICTP) in Trieste, Italy in 1992 as a staff-associate while continuing his affiliation with INR (Moscow) as a leading research scientist. He became a staff member with ICTP in 1997 and where he held the position of principal research scientist. Since 2015 he is a permanent scientist and Max-Planck Fellow at the Max-Planck-Institut für Kernphysik (MPIK) in Heidelberg.

== Research and achievements ==
The main area of Smirnov's research is neutrino physics and astrophysics. In 1984—1985, following earlier work by Lincoln Wolfenstein, Smirnov, together with Stanislav Mikheyev, uncovered effects of resonance enhancement of neutrino oscillations in matter and the adiabatic conversion in non-uniform media known now as the Mikheyev–Smirnov–Wolfenstein effect (MSW effect). Solutions to the solar neutrino problem based on the MSW effect have been proposed. The effects were also applied to supernova neutrinos and neutrinos of various origins propagating in the Earth.

In the following years Smirnov and his colleagues developed a number of aspects of theory and phenomenology of neutrino conversion in various media. Currently Smirnov is working on implications of the obtained neutrino results for fundamental physics (quark-lepton complementarity, unification, etc.) as well as on future programs of studies in neutrino physics.

Smirnov is a co-recipient of the 2005 Bruno Pontecorvo Prize "for his prediction and study of the influence of matter on neutrino oscillations". For his lifetime achievements in physics Smirnov was named Humboldt Research Fellow. This is one of the Germany's most prestigious awards in science which enables outstanding scientists and scholars from abroad to spend up to six months at the Humboldt Institute to carry out research on projects of their own choosing. Alexei Smirnov and Stanislav Mikheyev were awarded the 2008 Sakurai Prize "for pioneering and influential work on the enhancement of neutrino oscillations in matter, which is essential to a quantitative understanding of the solar neutrino flux".

Smirnov is an editor of the Journal of High Energy Physics and Journal of Cosmology and Astroparticle Physics and a divisional associate editor for Physical Review Letters. He is also member of the advisory board of the journal Universe. His awards and honors also include the Biedenharn endowed chair in physics (University of Texas, Austin, 2002), the award of the Japanese Society for promotion of science (2004), an Alexander von Humboldt Foundation research award (2004), and the Erwin Schrödinger guest professorship (Vienna, 2007), as well as the 2016 Albert Einstein Medal.

== See also ==
- List of theoretical physicists
