= Kim Yi-seol =

South Korean writer (born 1975)

- Born: 1975 (age 50–51)
- Occupation: Writer

Kim Yi-seol (born 1975) is a South Korean writer. She was born in 1975 in Yesan, Chungcheongnamdo. She began her literary career when her short story “Yeolse sal” (열세 살 Thirteen) won the Seoul Shinmun New Writer's Contest in 2006. She has written novellas Nappeun pi (나쁜 피 Bad Blood), Hwanyeong (환영 The Spector), and Seonhwa (선화). She published a short story collection, Amudo malhaji anneun geotdeul (아무도 말하지 않는 것들 Things No One Says). In 2012 she won the 1st Hwang Sun-won Literary Award for New Literature, and the 3rd Munhakdongne Young Writer's Award.

== Life ==
Kim Yi-seol's works feature a lot of stories that have to do with the relationship between the mother and the child, such as childbirth and childcare. Kim Yi-seol has said that she wouldn't be able to write such stories if she hadn't had the experience of childbirth. She has expressed that through pregnancy and giving birth, she has experienced how children are weak and insecure, and how their bonds with their mothers should not be broken. Her experiences of childbirth and childcare has also affected her thoughts on writing fiction. It made her realize the anxiety for completing the draft as well as a sense of duty. When she was writing Nappeun pi (나쁜 피 Bad Blood), she had started writing only 3 days after her childbirth.

== Writing ==
Kim Yi-seol's works depict the violence of the lives of the lowest members of society. Particularly, she descriptively shows the experience of violence that is done to a woman's sex and body. Hwanyeong (환영 The Spector) depicts the process of how a woman turns to selling all her labor as well as her sex for family.

In Kim Yi-seol's stories, the violence that is done to women's bodies is depicted through women who belong to the lowest level of society in Korea. The protagonists of Kim Yi-seol's stories are those who are exposed to the worst imaginable risks, and will be exposed to those risks, such as a female homeless person, a surrogate mother, an abandoned girl, a uterine cancer patient, a mentally handicapped woman, and a prostitute. By showing the violence that is being done on such people, Kim Yi-seol's stories depict how bad the ‘impoverishment of women’ has become since its progress after the IMF.

Kim Yi-seol's views on family have been described as harsh. Kim Yi-seol seems to consider that a blood relation does nothing but imprisoning each other, and is mutually meaningless outside of that. In “Bugo” (부고 The Obituary), the protagonist experiences a downward spiral situation, in which she constantly falls through: divorced parents, rape, death of her mother, parting from a lover, and abortion. The one who consoles is neither her father nor her big brother, but her stepmother, who has similar scars. In “Hanpa Tteukbo” (한파 특보 A Cold Wave Warning), the protagonist's father constantly throws out verbal abuse for the sole reason of his pride for having worked for the family all his life. The protagonist can smile from time to time only when avoiding the father and cracking jokes with coworkers.

== Works ==
- Oneulcheoreom goyohi (오늘처럼 고요히 Quiet Like Today), 2016.
- Seonhwa (선화), 2014.
- Hwanyeong (환영 The Welcome), 2011.
- Amudo malhaji anneun geotdeul (아무도 말하지 않는 것들 Things No One Says), 2010.
- Nappeun pi (나쁜 피 Bad Blood), 2009.

=== Works in Translation ===
- Willkommen (German)

== Awards ==
- Hwang Sun-won Literary Award for New Literature, 2012.
- Munhakdongne Young Writer's Award, 2012.
