= David Cline =

David Cline may refer to:

- David Cline (activist), American anti-war and veterans rights activist
- David B. Cline, American particle physicist
