= Pak Hwasong =

Korean novelist, short story writer, and essayist

- Hangul: 박화성
- Hanja: 朴花城
- RR: Bak Hwaseong
- MR: Pak Hwasŏng

Pak Hwasŏng or Pak Kyŏngsun (1904–1988) was a Korean novelist, short story writer and essayist. A witness to both Korea under Japanese rule and the Korean War, Pak's stories foregrounded social concerns and the particular situation of women caught in circumstances out of their control.

== Life ==
Pak Hwasŏng's first published story, 'Ch'usŏk chŏnya' (Autumn Harvest Day Eve) - the story of a girl working in a textiles factory - appeared in the literary magazine Chosŏn mundan in 1925. In 1926 she enrolled in the English department of Nihon Women's College in Japan, joining the Tokyo branch of Kŭnuhoe. Unable to complete her studies, Pak returned to Korea, working as an educator in schools and for a variety of literary organizations.

== Works ==
- 'Ch'usŏk chŏnya' (Autumn Harvest Day Eve), 1925, first published in the literary magazine Chosŏn mundan
- Hongsu chŏnhu (Before and After the Flood), 1932
- Paekhwa (White Flower), 1932. Serialised in Tonga ilbo.
- 'Kohyang ŏmnŭn saramdŭl' (People without Homeland), 1936
- Hyuhwasan (Inactive Volcano), 1977
- Kohyang ŏmnŭn saramdŭl (People Without A Homeland'), 1994

== Awards ==
- 1984: Samil Prize
