= David B. Cline =

American particle physicist

David Bruce Cline
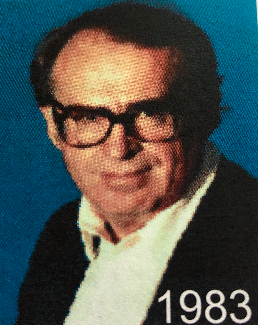
- Professor David B. Cline, 1983
- Born: December 7, 1933; Rosedale, Kansas, U.S.
- Died: June 27, 2015 (aged 81)
- Education: Kansas State University; University of Wisconsin–Madison (PhD)
- Known for: Contributions to the discovery of the W and Z bosons, Higgs boson, CMS experiment, neutrino and dark matter research
- Scientific career
- Fields: Particle physics
- Institutions: University of Wisconsin–Madison; UCLA; CERN
- Doctoral advisor: William Fry

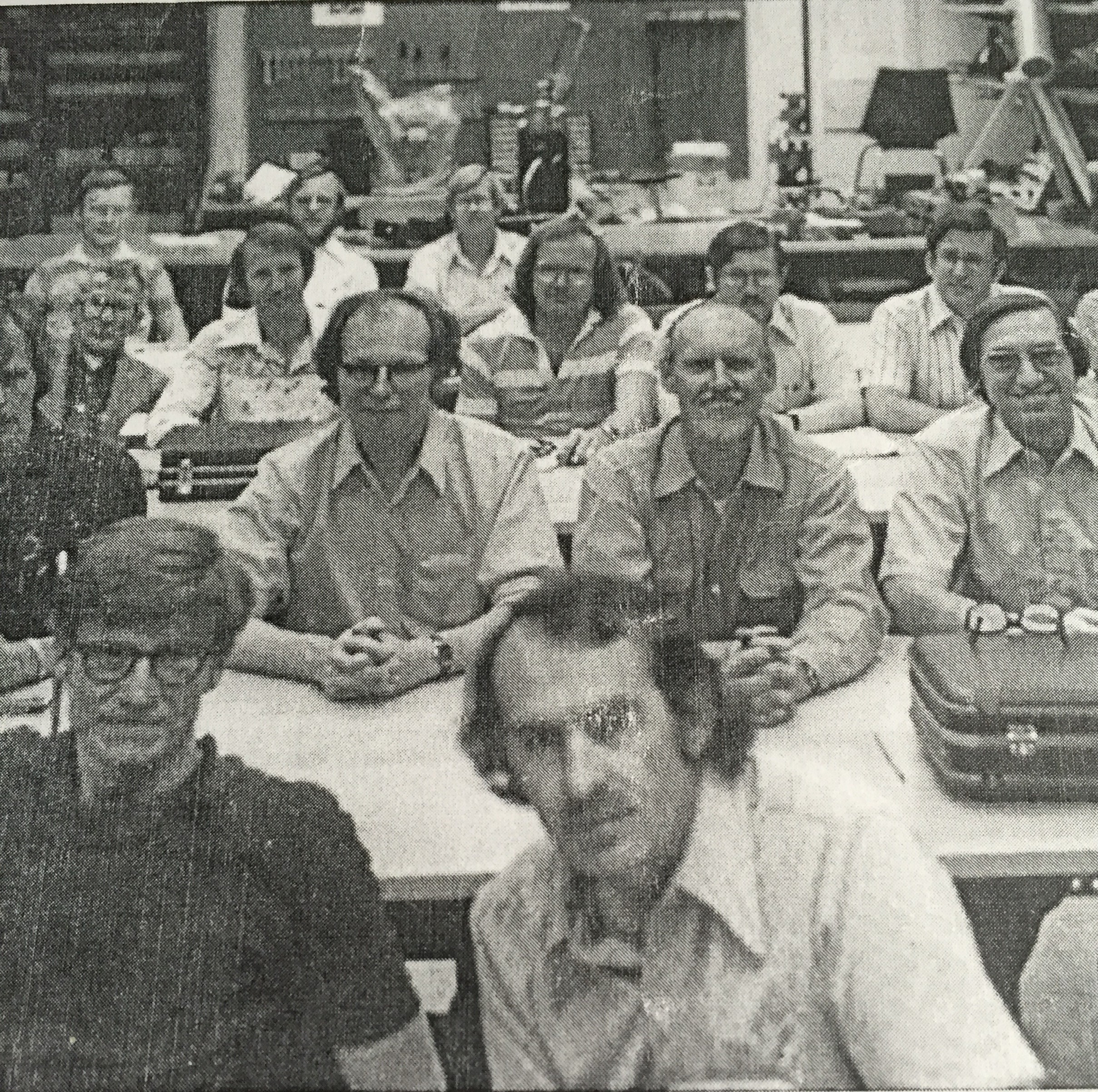
David B. Cline, among other physicists, at a cosmic ray meeting in 1979

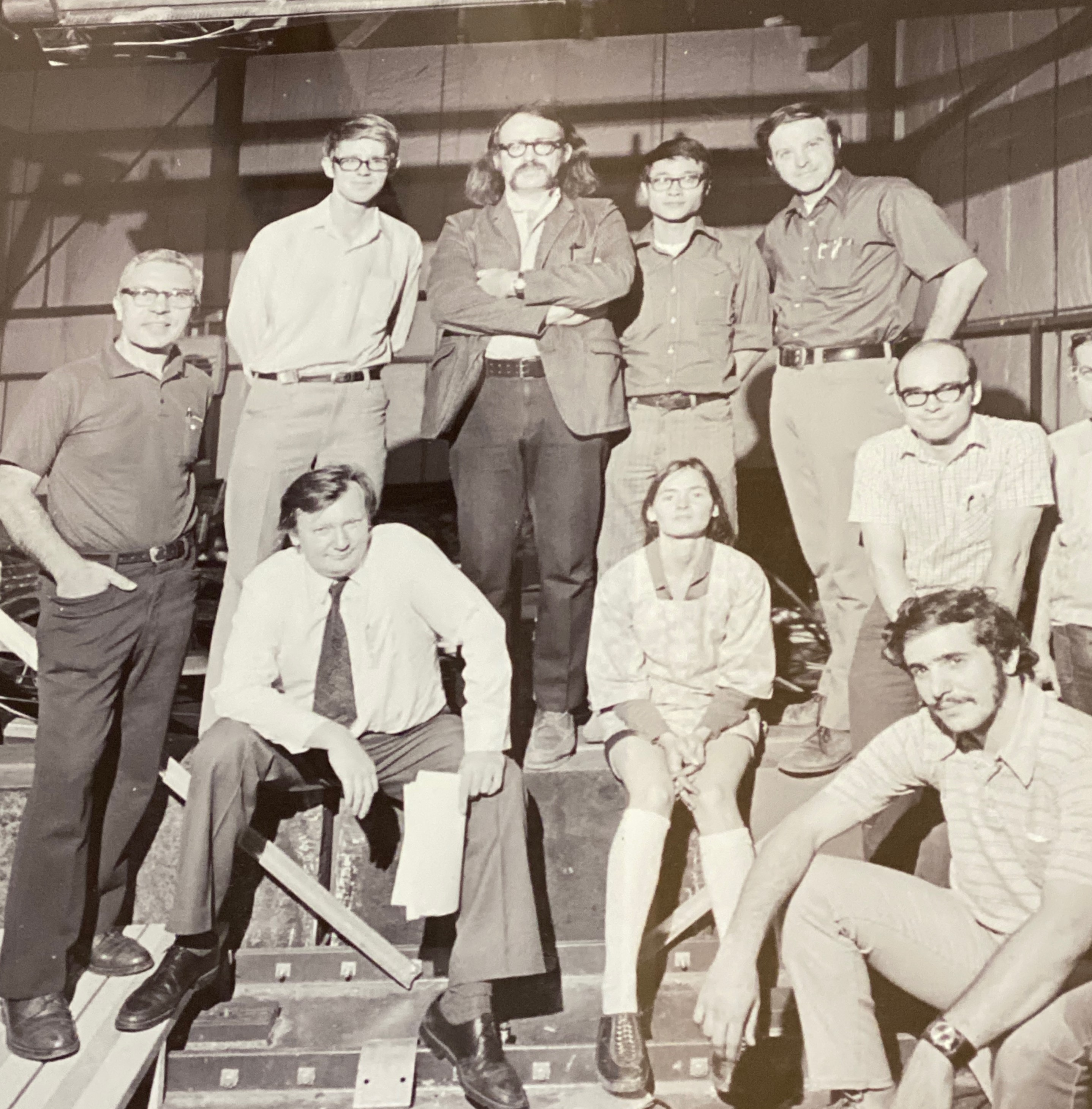
Cline, among other physicists, in a salt mine. [Editor note: Most likely the site of a neutrino detector]

David Bruce Cline (December 7, 1933 – June 27, 2015) was an American particle physicist known for his contributions to the discovery of the Higgs boson and the W and Z intermediate bosons. After receiving his Ph.D. from the University of Wisconsin–Madison, he went on to join the university's physics faculty and founded the "Pheno Group". Shorthand for phenomenology, the group consisted of particle physicists designing and running experiments alongside developing theoretical models that went beyond the current standard model of particle physics. He later moved to UCLA where he became a Distinguished Professor of Physics & Astronomy for his contributions to the growth of the UCLA Physics & Astronomy Department.

Rather than working in a U.S. based particle accelerator, the Superconducting Supercollider, Cline chose to work on CERN's Large Hadron Collider. While there, he and others founded the Compact Muon Solenoid (CMS) experiment, which is still active today in investigating the Standard Model and is one of the largest international scientific collaborations in history. Cline was also involved in the development of the ICARUS neutrino detector. When assembled, it would be the largest detector of its time, built with the purpose of detecting neutrinos from the sun and the beams from CERN.

In the later part of his career, Cline shifted his interests towards astroparticle physics. He pioneered the use of liquified noble gases in particle detectors to enhance the detection through the use of a Time Projection Chamber. Not only did this facilitate work in investigating neutrino oscillations, the introduction of noble gases into detectors could be exploited to detect dark matter. Dark matter's elusive nature inspired Cline to organize a biannual international conference for dark matter research, which will go on to have its 14th meeting in March 2020.

== Early life and education ==
Cline was born on December 7, 1933, in Rosedale, Kansas. He attended and graduated from Rosedale High School in the same city, and after being discharged from the army, attended Kansas State University, where he received a BS in physics in 1959 and MS in physics in 1961 in physics. He continued his studies and pursued a PhD at the University of Wisconsin - Madison under the guidance of Dr. William Fry. He completed his PhD thesis in 1965, titled "A Study of Some Rare Decay Modes of the Positive Kaon". His PhD work investigated the existence of the then undiscovered electrically charged W boson and electrically neutral Z boson. His observations of decaying kaons dismissed the existence of the neutral weak force carrier, but he would later go on to withdraw this belief when experiments at CERN claimed to require the existence of the Z boson for certain interactions.

== Career ==
In 1967, Cline was appointed to the faculty at the University of Wisconsin. Once there, he co-founded the "Pheno Group", which consisted of physicists dedicated to pursuing a broad range of particle physics research in both theory and phenomenology.

The same year, Cline began working at CERN, and with Alfred E. Mann of the University of Pennsylvania and Carlo Rubbia of Harvard, the team produced a document that launched the first experiments to study the weak force using neutrino beams at the new Fermilab accelerator complex. After a period of uncertainty, Cline and collaborators agreed with the claim coming from the CERN laboratory in Geneva that certain neutrino interactions required the existence of weak neutral currents. In 1976, the group proposed upgrading the single-beam proton accelerator at CERN to a dual-beam proton-antiproton collider. The installation of this 270 GeV antiproton-proton collider, along with the implementation of more advanced beam-cooling techniques, prompted the investigation for intermediate vector bosons (IVB). With a theorized mass of 80-90 GeV, it was expected that the high energy of the collider would lead to the first observations of these particles. The experiment at CERN proved successful, and in 1983 IVBs were detected and differentiated the weak force from the electromagnetic force for the first time. The discovery warranted the 1984 Nobel Prize in Physics, awarded to Dr. Carlo Rubbia and Dr. Simon van der Meer for the discovery of the W and Z bosons.

Following his involvement in the discovery of the W and Z boson, Cline moved to the UCLA Physics Department in 1986. Once there, he began actively pursuing efforts to grow the university's particle physics department and incorporate new areas of research. He was focused on hiring faculty with a specialization in accelerator physics, which was a rapidly growing field at the time. Cline became a distinguished professor of physics and astronomy for his contributions to the growth of astroparticle physics and accelerator physics with the support of the UCLA Physics & Astronomy department that gained him global recognition in the field. He proposed investigations into the mass of the ν_{Τ} & ν_{e} neutrinos using terrestrial solar and supernova neutrino sources, nucleon decay using the ICARUS detector in Italy, and neutrino oscillations. To accomplish his projects, Cline and a small group of US physicists proposed the new design of a supernova neutrino detector large enough to observe extra-galactic supernova bursts.

Cline was part of the experiment that made their discovery in 1983 at CERN which first implemented the scheme they proposed in 1976. Later Cline was also a member of the Fermilab experiment that discovered the top quark and of one of the CERN experiments that discovered the Higgs boson in 2012.

At UCLA he was also one of the pioneers of the use of liquefied noble gases as particle detectors and made innovative contributions to the development of the use of liquid argon and xenon to detect dark matter.

In the early 1990s, the U.S. had plans to build the Superconducting Supercollider. Cline was among many other U.S. scientists who chose to work on a competing European based supercollider, CERN's Large Hadron Collider . He continued working at CERN's LHC and was a cofounder of the Compact Muon Solenoid (CMS) experiment. The goal was to detect and measure the stable particles that remain after colliding protons at nearly the speed of light, in an effort to investigate physics beyond the Standard Model and identify the conditions of the early universe.

The CMS was constructed and is located at one of the four collision points that make up the LHC and is designed to detect muons with high accuracy and be the most powerful solenoid magnet of its time, being capable of producing a magnetic field of 4 tesla. The international collaboration that was CMS would come to be one of the largest of its kind, incorporating over 200 institutes and 50 countries. The collaboration proved to be successful, as the CMS was involved in the first 7 TeV proton-proton collisions, the discovery of the Xi_{b} baryon, and the discovery of the Higgs Boson. David Cline is listed as a contributor to these experiments for his contribution to the creation of CMS.

Cline was also involved in a collaboration between over 25 universities across the globe who proposed the construction of a neutrino detector in Fermilab in 2005. The proposed detector would be a 30 Kiloton Off-Axis Detector, with the purpose of studying ν_{μ} → ν_{e} Oscillations in the NuMI Beamline. The NuMI Off-axis ν_{e} Appearance, or NOvA, collaboration brings together over 240 scientists from 51 institutions to study the effects neutrinos may have had on the evolution of the universe

== Notable Involvements ==
=== Super Proton-Antiproton Synchrotron & Compact Muon Solenoid ===
Although Cline is not credited for the discovery of the W and Z bosons, Cline and Rubbia's proposal of the installation of a proton-antiproton collider has led to advances in particle physics through the investigation of heavy bosons. Cline's role as a co-founder of the CMS experiment has also earned him the status of a contributor to the first 7 & 8 TeV proton-proton collisions, as well as the discovery of the Higgs Boson and Xi_{b} baryon.

=== Investigation of Dimuon Events ===
In the early 70s, Cline investigated the production of dimuons from neutrinos and antineutrinos. These neutrino events require the generation and decay of intermediate particles that did not agree with models that predicted the intermediate particles to be heavy leptons and semi-weak vector bosons.

In February 1975, Cline and others reported on their observation of a new particle produced by high energy neutrino and antineutrino interactions. 14 dimuon events were observed, and due to the characteristics of the event and the absence of any trimuon events, the interaction seemed to require the presence of a new massive particle. The theorized particle, which was expected to have a previously unobserved quantum number, would need to decay weakly in order to have two muons in the final state.

The source of the second muon was argued to be due to the decay of pions and kaons. Cline and others provided evidence against this by observing "(i) the rate of dimuon events, (ii) the opposite signs of their electric charges, (iii) the different densities of the target materials in which they were produced, and (iv) the distributions in muon momentum and transverse momentum."

The neutrino interactions leading to dimuon events required the existence of a new particle that they called the y particle. The group theorized that, if the particle was a hadron, the mass is between 2 and 4 GeV and the lifetime would have to be less than 10^{−10}s. The alternate theory was that the neutrino interaction produced a neutral heavy lepton that decayed into two muons and a neutrino/antineutrino.

=== Physics potential of a few 100-GeV mu+ mu- collider ===
Cline's most cited single-author paper describes the potential applications of " a few 100-GeV μ^{+}μ^{−} collider". His proposal was inspired by the evidence that the Standard Model and SUSY Model should exhibit a resonance at a mass just under 2M_{z}. At this energy range, it was very difficult to accurately detect and measure interactions at the LHC. Reaching such high energies was needed to search for the Higgs. The μ^{+}μ^{−} collider would have also had applications in investigating TeV interactions with higher resolution than colliders at the time.

=== High-Transverse-Momentum Secondaries and Rising Total Cross Sections in Cosmic-Ray Interactions ===
While he was still at UW - Madison, Cline worked with Dr. Francis Halzen and studied hadron collisions from cosmic ray interactions. Their observations showed evidence for high-transverse-momentum secondaries in excess of the predicted exponential cutoff, which matched data from CERN at the time. Experiments at CERN ISR had shown that the cross sections of hadron collisions had been larger than expected. The data supported the quark model of the proton, where small momentum collisions would scatter at the "surface", leading to an exponential cutoff of the transverse-momentum. High momentum collisions, however, lead to interactions with the quarks and produce high-transverse momentum along with a jet of hadrons. Their study concluded that the rise in the total cross section of the interactions of cosmic rays and the detection of hadron jets supports the theory of a composite model of the proton.

=== Observation of Elastic Neutrino-Proton Scattering ===
Cline spent time exploring weak neutral current interactions by scattering neutrinos by protons. Previously, the exploration of this interaction was difficult due to the high neutron background and poor pion-proton separation. Cline mitigated these hindrances by using a detector that was sufficiently large enough to capture neutrino induced neutrons, which could be absorbed or detected through their interactions in the outer regions of the detector. Using a wide-band horn-focused neutrino beam at Brookhaven National Laboratory, Cline and others observed 30 events of neutrino-proton elastic scattering, which gave results consistent with most broken-gauge-symmetry models involving the weak neutral current.

=== Experimental Observation of Plasma Wake-Field Acceleration ===
At Argonne National Laboratory Advanced Accelerator Test Facility, Cline and group created a plasma-wake field by exciting 21 MeV electrons through a dense plasma to measure the accelerated and deflected wake-field. This was one of the first instances of an experiment having performed a direct measurement of plasma wake fields by accelerating an injected witness-beam pulse in the wake of an intense driver-beam pulse in a plasma. They also demonstrated the existence of strong transverse wake fields using the witness beam.

=== The Search for Dark Matter ===
The XENON100 project was a large collaboration dedicated to finding dark matter particles that Cline was involved in. Conducted at Laboratori Nazionali del Gran Sasso (LNGS) for 13 months during 2011 and 2012. The experiment featured an ultra-low electromagnetic background of (5.3 ± 0.6) × 10^{−3} events/(kg day keVee) in the energy region of interest. The resulting data provided the most stringent limit for the mass of WIMPs, m_{χ}>8 GeV/c^{2}, with a minimum nucleon cross section of σ=2.0×10^{−45} cm^{2} at m_{χ}=55 GeV/c^{2}.

=== Detection of Energy Deposition Down to the KeV Region Using Liquid Xenon Scintillation ===
Cline was part of a collaboration to detect cosmic energy depositions in the KeV range in 1993. The group proposed a liquid xenon detector that could detect energies low enough to provide evidence for WIMPs. The proposed detector would also be able to distinguish alpha particles from gamma rays using scintillation and charge signal techniques. Previous detectors were not able to differentiate between background radioactivity and electrical noise, but by the utilization of an active chamber with high charge detection efficiency and liquid xenon scintillation, Cline and others suggested and believed that this type of detector would be the most effective method of directly measuring WIMPs.

=== Detection of Primordial Black Holes ===
When primordial black holes explode at the end of their life, they send a myriad of particles flying across the universe. In 1992, Cline set out to investigate how accurately the current models described the hadronic and leptonic spectrum of these bursts, and predicted values for the upper limit of the particle densities. He suggested methods to detect gamma and neutrino bursts by utilizing the SuperNova Burst Observatory set to be constructed in New Mexico's WIPP site.

== Published works ==
=== Papers ===
David B. Cline has over 1400 published papers, and is cited over 90,000 times in various journals for high energy and astroparticle physics. He participated in numerous collaborations including, but not limited to, the ICARUS project, CMS at CERN, and UA1 collaboration. Below are some of the most cited and influential works that he contributed to.

- Observation of a New Boson at a Mass of 125 GeV with the CMS Experiment at the LHC, CMS Collaboration - S. Chatrchyan, et al. (July 31, 2012) Published in: Phys. Lett. B 716 (2012) 30–61. doi:10.1016/j.physletb.2012.08.021
- The CMS Experiment at the CERN LHC, CMS Collaboration - S. Chatrchyan, et al. (Aug 1, 2008) Published in JINST 3 (2008) S08004. doi:10.1088/1748-0221/3/08/S08004
- Experimental Observations of Isolated Large Transverse Energy Electrons with Associated Missing Energy at S^{1/2} = 540-GeV, UA1 Collaboration - G. Arnison, et al. (Jan 1, 1982) Published in Phys. Lett. B 122 (1983) 103–116. doi:10.1016/0370-2693(83)91177-2
- Experimental Observation of Lepton Pairs of Invariant Mass Around 95-GeV/c^{2} at the CERN SPS Collider, UA1 Collaboration - G. Arnison, et al. (June 1, 1983) Published in Phys. Lett. B 126 (1983) 398–410. doi:10.1016/0370-2693(83)90188-0
- Dark Matter Results from 225 Live Days of XENON100 Data, XENON100 Collaboration - E. Aprile, et al. (July 25, 2012) Published in: Phys. Rev. Lett. 109 (2012) 181301 doi:10.1103/PhysRevLett.109.181301
- CMS Technical Design Report, Volume II: Physics Performance, CMS Collaboration - G. L. Bayatian, et al. (Oct 23, 2007) Published in J. Phys. G 34 (2007) 6, 995–1579. doi:10.1088/0954-3899/34/6/S01
- Determination of Jet Energy Calibration and Transverse Momentum resolution in CMS, CMS Collaboration - S. Chatrchyan, et al. (July 21, 2011) Published in JINST 6 (2011) P11002. doi:10.1088/1748-0221/6/11/P11002
- Performance of CMS Muon Reconstruction in pp Collision Events at S^{1/2} = 7 TeV, CMS Collaboration - S. Chatrchyan, et al. (June 19, 2012) Published in JINST 7 (2012) P10002. doi:10.1088/1748-0221/7/10/P10002
- Identification of b-Quark Jets with the CMS Experiment, CMS Collaboration - S. Chatrchyan, et al. (Nov 19, 2012) Published in JINST 8 (2013) P04013. doi:10.1088/1748-0221/8/04/P04013
- Combined Results of Searhes for the Standard Model Higgs Boson in pp Collisions at S^{1/2} = 7 TeV, CMS Collaboration - S. Chatrchyan, et al. (Feb 7, 2012) Published in Phys. Lett. B 710 (2012) 26–48. doi:10.1016/j.physletb.2012.02.064

Papers
Category	Total	Single Authored
All Papers	1445	273
Books	5	1
Conference Paper	517	196
Introductory	10	5
Lectures	5	5
Published	758	26
Review	59	43
Thesis	1	1
Proceedings	42	22

=== Books ===
- Weak Neutral Currents: The Discovery of the Electro-weak Force, by David B. Cline. (Jan 1, 1997) ISBN 9780201933475
- B/K Decays and Novel Flavor Factories, by David B. Cline (Editor) Published March 27, 1998 by American Institute of Physics. ISBN 9781563960550
- CP Violation and Beauty Factories and Related Issues in Physics, by David B. Cline (Contributor) and Alfred Fridman (Editor). Published Jan 1st 1991 by New York Academy of Sciences. ISBN 9780897666237
- The Fourth Family of Quarks and Leptons First international Symposium, by David B. Cline (Contributor) and Amarjit Soni. Published Jan 1st, 1987 by New York Academy of Sciences. ISBN 9780897664356
- Unification of Elementary Forces and Gauge Theories, by David B. Cline. Published Nov 1st, 1980 by Harwood Academic Pub. ISBN 9780906346006

=== Articles ===
Cline wrote a total of seven articles for the Scientific American magazine. They are summarized below.

- The Search for Dark Matter, by David B. Cline, was an article published in the March 2003 issue of the Scientific American and David Cline's seventh and final contribution to the magazine. The article highlights the complexities in the search for dark matter, and progress in its discovery.
- Low Energy Ways to Observe High-Energy Phenomena, by David B. Cline, was published in the September 1994 issue of Scientific American. Cline beings by introducing the concept of flavor-changing neutral currents (FCNCs), which is a class of interactions that change the flavor of fermions without changing the charge, and are theorized to be caused by new and exotic particles that lie beyond the Standard Model.
- Beyond Truth and Beauty: A Fourth Family of Particles, by David B. Cline, was published in the August 1988 issue of Scientific American and explains why a fourth family of quarks and leptons is likely to exist due to charge-parity violation seen in certain particle decays.
- The Search for Intermediate Vector Bosons, by David B. Cline, Carlo Rubbia and Simon van der Meer and published in the March 1982 issue of Scientific American, dives into the theorized massive elementary particles that serve to carry the weak nuclear force.
- The Search for New Families of Elementary Particles, by David B. Cline, Alfred K. Mann, and Carlo Rubbia and published in the January 1976 edition of Scientific American, describes the discovery of a particle that exhibits some hitherto unobserved property of matter that has researchers believing it doesn't fit in the established families.
- The Detection of Weak Neutral Currents, written by David B. Cline, Alfred K. Mann, and Carlo Rubbia, was an article published in the December 1974 issue of Scientific American highlighting the previously unobserved interactions from the W and Z boson that support a link between the weak nuclear force and the electromagnetic force.
- High-Energy Scattering, by David B. Cline and Vernon D. Barger and published in the December 1967 edition of Scientific American explains what it takes to study the properties of fundamental particles. By accelerating and colliding particles at high energies, researchers are able to observe the fundamental particles that composed the previous particles using a bubble chamber.

== References in Media ==
=== Last Documented Interview ===
David Cline's last documented interview was a part of director Vincent Tran's movie One Under the Sun (2017), a science-fiction movie in which "The sole survivor of a doomed space mission attempts to reunite with her terminally ill daughter. The government, however, believes she's returned to earth with an extraordinary power and orders her confined to a secret facility". The movie captured Cline's last documented interview, in which he discusses religion, the origin of the universe and how it relates to the origin of life, and the Higgs boson. He most notably considers the journey of a universe consisting only of elementary particles, and how we can study these elementary particles to investigate the origins of the universe and the big bang.
He ponders on the idea that the universe was self-created, following Stephen Hawking's argument which he popularized in his book "The Grand Design". Cline argued that the Higgs boson must be present at the beginning of the universe in order to account for the mass of matter, and without it, the universe could not have been self-created. He admits that this topic borders on the line of religion because of the lack of proof and its ability to undermine other theories. Concerning the origin of life, Cline sets out on connecting the Higgs boson to the big bang. He begins by stating the coincidence that all amino acids are left handed molecules and all nucleic acids are right handed molecules. He argues that life could have been created by any combinations of the amino-acids found on earth, but life settled on the 21 acids by chance. Cline mentions a meteor found in Australia, referencing the Murchison meteorite. He explains that because the meteor had a large volume, the core of the meteor was left unharmed from the radiation that had damaged the outer layers. This led to the great discovery of over 70 new amino acids, different from the ones previously found on earth. He uses this example to illustrate how many different combinations of amino-acids could have led to the formation of life, leading to the necessity of a common origin of life. Supernova explosions emit 10^{57} neutrinos, which can induce a left-handedness in the surrounding matter, and due to the Supernova Neutrino Amino Acid Processing model, leading to the generation of left-handed amino acids, dubbing them amino-acid factories. Cline concludes by stating his belief that all amino acids in our body came from outer space, connecting the origin of life to the early days of the universe.

=== Books ===
==== Telescope in the Ice ====
The Telescope in the Ice: Inventing a New Astronomy at the South Pole, by Mark Bowen draws on his involvement in the IceCube project in Antarctica. David Cline was mentioned in the book due to his role in the project as well. Cline was involved in the search for high-energy cosmic neutrinos through the IceCube Neutrino Observatory at the Amundsen-Scott South Pole Station. He was brought on the project for his expertise in neutrino interactions, and was said to be one of the project's founder's, Francis Halzen, most important mentors.

==== Nobel Dreams ====
Nobel Dreams: Power, Deceit and the Ultimate Experiment, by Gary Taubes mentions Cline for his contributions as a collaborator to the UA1 and UA2 experiments; the former eventually found the W and Z bosons, and then won the award the book was named after.

== Personal life ==
David Cline married twice. He died on June 27, 2015, at UCLA Medical Center, following a heart attack on campus the previous afternoon. He is survived by five children and eight grandchildren.
