= Cecilia Lunardini =

Italian nuclear astrophysicist

Cecilia Lunardini is an Italian nuclear astrophysicist known for her research on neutrinos from the sun, from the cosmic neutrino background, from supernovae and failed supernovae, and from collisions of stars with black holes. She is a professor of physics at Arizona State University.

== Education and career ==
Lunardini studied physics at the University of Pavia, graduating in 1998. She completed a Ph.D. in physics at the International School for Advanced Studies in 2001, under the supervision of Alexei Smirnov. Her dissertation won the Giorgio Gamberini prize of the Scuola Normale Superiore di Pisa.

After postdoctoral research at the Institute for Advanced Study and University of Washington, she became an assistant professor at the Arizona State University in 2007, concurrently with a five-year research fellowship at the Brookhaven National Laboratory. She earned an Italian habilitation in 2014, and was promoted to full professor in 2018.

== Recognition ==
Lunardini was named a Fellow of the American Physical Society (APS) in 2020, after a nomination by the APS Division for Nuclear Physics, "for outstanding contributions to nuclear and neutrino astrophysics, in particular to the theoretical analysis of supernova neutrino propagation and prospects for detection".
