= Jung Hansuk =

- Born: November 3, 1922; Yongbyon, Heianhoku-dō, Korea, Empire of Japan
- Died: 1997
- Citizenship: South Korean
- Writing career
- Language: Korean

- Korean name
- Hangul: 정한숙
- Hanja: 鄭漢淑
- RR: Jeong Hansuk
- MR: Chŏng Hansuk

Jung Hansuk (Korean: 정한숙; November 3, 1922 – 1997) was a South Korean writer and critic.

== Life ==
Jung Hansuk was born on November 3, 1922 in Yongbyon, Heianhoku-dō, Korea, Empire of Japan and died in 1977. Jung graduated from Korea University in 1950. Jung Hansuk also served in executive capacity for a number of literary organizations: he was at various times the vice president of Korean Fiction Writers’ Association, director of Korean Culture and Arts Foundation, and president of The Korean Academy of the Arts.

== Work ==
In his works of fiction, Jung Hansuk experimented with a variety of subject matters and techniques in order to create portraits of Korean people in the changing world of post-war Korean society. A serious social problem he investigated with particular adroitness and sensitivity is one of generation gap; “An Old House” (Goga, 1956), a story of young people seeking to escape from the traditional family system, skillfully explores this conflict between generations against the backdrop of war-torn Korea. Despite the fact that the world Jung Hansuk sketches in his fiction is fraught with moral deterioration accompanying extreme material privation, he maintains an ethical stance toward it and emphasizes the need to aspire to the ideal. These characteristics are evident in his early stories as well, such as “Adam’s Journey” (Adamui haengno) and “A Madwoman” (Gwangnyeo), both published in 1952, and “Betrayal” (Baesin) which appeared the following year. “A Story of Jeonhwangdang’s Book of Seal Imprints” explores the tensions between past traditions and contemporary reality in yet another way; gentle nostalgia for the world of classicism and beauty suffuses this story of a master seal engraver whose craft can no longer find an appreciative audience. The work effectively juxtaposes classical language of literati with the vulgar idiom of daily life. Furthermore, Jung Hansuk has written historical fictions such as Geumdang byeokhwa, Lee Seonggye, and Nongae. Starting in mid-1980s, Jung also published works of poetry.

Jung was recipient of the Korean Academy of the Arts Award (1986) and the March First Culture Award (1988).

== Works in Translation ==
- Bridge (Korean: 끊어진 다리)
- Iyo Island (Korean: 이어도)

== Works in Korean (Partial) ==
Novels

- Love Zone (Aejeong jidae, 1957)
- Hwang Jini (1958)
- Season of Darkness (Amheugui gyejeol, 1959)
- Recollections of Simon (Simonui hoesang, 1959)
- The Broken Bridge (Kkeuneojin dari, 1963)
- We Are Much Alike (Urin seoro dalmatda, 1966)

Story collections

- Cat's Eye, Cat's Mind (Myoan myosim, 1958)
- My Colorful Love Life (Nae sarangui pyeolleok, 1959)
- A Quiet Morning (Joyonghan achim, 1976)
- The Foggy Street (Angae geori, 1983)
- Festival on University Boulevard (Daehangno chukje, 1987)

Works of Criticism

- Studies in Modern Korean Fiction (Hyeondae Hanguk soseollon, 1973)
- On the Craft of Fiction Writing (Soseol gisullon, 1975)
- Studies on Modern Korean Writers (Hyeondae Hanguk jakgaron, 1976)
- A History of Korean Literature of the Liberation Period (Haebang mundansa, 1980)
- A History of Modern Korean Literature (Hyeondae Hanguk munhaksa, 1982).

== Awards ==
- 1986: Korean Academy of the Arts Award
- 1988: Samil Prize
