= Kyung-ja Chun =

South Korean painter

- Hangul: 천경자
- Hanja: 千鏡子
- RR: Cheon Gyeongja
- MR: Ch'ŏn Kyŏngja

Kyung-ja Chun (1924-August 6, 2015) was a prominent South Korean painter. She was born in 1924 in Goheung, South Jeolla Province, Chun studied painting at a college in Tokyo.

She was best known for her bold and vividly colorful paintings depicting mainly female figures, flowers, and animals. One of her most famous paintings, "Page 22 in My Sorrowful Legend" (1977) is a self-portrait with snakes on top of a woman's head.

== Awards ==
- 1975: Samil Prize
