= Jeong Byeong-uk =

South Korean literature scholar (1922–1982)

- Born: March 25, 1922; Munhang-ri, Seolcheon-myeon, Namhae-gun, Gyeongsangnam-do, Korea
- Died: October 12, 1982 (aged 60)
- Occupations: Scholar; bibliographer; folklorist
- Writing career
- Language: Korean
- Subjects: Korean classical poetry; Korean classical novels; Pansori
- Notable works: 「한국고전시가론」(The Theories of Korean Classical Poetry); 「한국고전의 재인식」(Reappreciation of Korean Classics); 「한국의 판소리」(Korean Pansori)

Jeong Byeong-uk (Korean: 정병욱; Hanja: 鄭炳昱; Korean pronunciation: [t͡ɕʌŋ.bʌŋ.uk]; March 25, 1922–October 12, 1982) was a scholar of Korean literature, bibliographer, folklorist, and a professor at Busan National University, Yonsei University, and Seoul National University. He specialized in classical Korean poetry, laying the groundwork for wider study of both Korean classical poetry and novels.

After Korea's liberation from Japan in 1945 he authored The Theories of Korean Classical Poetry (한국고전시가론 (1976) and Reappreciation of Korean Classics (한국고전의 재인식 (1979). He also contributed to the preservation, research, and popularization of Korean traditional musical storytelling (pansori) by writing Korean Pansori (한국의 판소리 (1980). He was a close friend of the poet Yun Dong-ju (윤동주) and published the first edition of Yun Dong-ju's Sky, Wind, Star, and Poem (하늘과 바람과 별과 시 (1948).

== Birth and education ==
Jeong was born in Munhang-ri, Seolcheon-myeon, Namhae-gun, Gyeongsangnam-do, South Korea, on March 25, 1922. His father Nam-seop Jeong (정남섭) was a Korean independence activist and Jeong junior was the eldest of his four sons and one daughter.

In April 1940 Jeong entered the College of Liberal Arts at Yonhi College where he decided to pursue the study of Korean literary history rather than becoming a writer. In 1944 his studies were disrupted when he was forcibly drafted into the Japanese military and stationed in Osaka, where he sustained a severe injury to his right arm during a US air raid. After Korea's liberation he resumed his education, transferring to the Department of Korean Language and Literature at Seoul National University in April 1946. Two years later he graduated from the university and began teaching as an assistant professor at Busan National University while also teaching Korean at Busan Girls' High School.

In 1952, during the Korean War, Jeong stayed in Busan for evacuation, founding the Society of Korean Language and Literature there and serving as the president after the war ended. He joined Yonsei University as an assistant professor in 1953 before moving to Seoul National University in 1957, where he taught for 27 years in the Department of Korean Language and Literature. From 1962 to 1963 he served as a visiting professor at the Harvard–Yenching Institute. Jeong earned his doctorate in Korean literature from Seoul National University in 1972, and two years later he founded the Society for Korean Pansori and became its first president. He also served as the director of the Seoul National University Museum and during the early 1980s as a member of the National Academy of Sciences of the Republic of Korea.

Jeong died on October 12, 1982 at the age of 60 due to complications from acute hypotension and liver cancer.

== Academic achievements ==
Jeong believed that classical literature must be appreciated by modern readers, not only as part of Korea's national cultural legacy but also as a contributor to the people's intellectual sophistication. His research focused on analyzing and systematizing classical Korean poetry including Joseon Si-jo[時調] and Koryo-gayo[高麗歌謠], and as a result of collecting and researching data for 15 years he was able to compile classical Korean poems and publish Dictionary of Sijo Literature (시조문학사전). He also discovered and introduced a number of classical novels stored at Nakseonjae (낙선재), a royal library during the Joseon Dynasty.

Jeong's academic work is characterized by a combination of both aesthetic critical analysis and empirical analysis through which he precisely explores the literary and historical aspects of Korean literature. He dedicated his life to revealing the essence of traditional Korean rhythm and aesthetic characteristics of 'Meot(멋)', and also contributed to a shift in Korean language education by helping change the emphasis on grammar and rote memorization to a focus on literature and writing. In recognition of his contributions to Korean literature and education he was honored with the Korea Book Author Award (한국출판문화상 저작상) in 1967, the Oesol Award (외솔상) in 1978, the Samil Prize (3.1 문화상) in 1980, and the Eun-gwan (Silver Crown) Order of Cultural Merit, Republic of Korea Medal (은관 문화 훈장) in 1991.

Internationally, Jeong helped introduce classical Korean literature to academic communities around the world. As a visiting professor at the Harvard-Yenching Institute and the Collège de France he lectured and published works on the historical tradition and characteristics of Korean literature. He took an active part in international academic conferences, presenting at the International Conference on Korean Studies at the University of Hawaii in 1971, at the International Conference of Orientalists in Paris in 1973, and at the Academic Association of Koreanology at Tenri University in Japan in 1977. He also wrote the entry on Korean literature in the Encyclopædia Britannica (브리태니커 백과사전).

== Impact on pansori ==
Jeong founded the Society for Korean Pansori in 1974, and from 1974 to 1978 he hosted over 100 pansori shows, financially supported by Chang-gi Han, a Korean journalist, entrepreneur, and founder of the Korean branch of the Encyclopædia Britannica. To preserve traditional Si-jo[時調] and pansori's singing element ("Chang"), Jeong recorded the performances of 20 renowned pansori singers in his shows and then published and distributed these recordings on LPs, each accompanied by explanations of each track. Jeong also made efforts to preserve pansori in written form by transcribing their melodies into musical scores and converting the lyrics into written text.

In his later years he expanded his research to explore the aesthetic principles of traditional Korean arts, encompassing poetry, literature, and pansori, as well as traditional Korean music and dance. As part of this effort he also served as the faculty advisor for the early Folk Masked Drama Research Society (민속가면극연구회) at Seoul National University, which studied, organized, and performed Talchum, the traditional Korean masked dance.

== Relationship with Yun Dong-ju ==
Jeong's friendship with Yun Dong-ju began when Yun was a third-year student at Yonhi College and visited Jeong in person after reading Jeong's work The Legend of the Cuckoo (뻐꾸기의 전설). Starting in Yun's fourth year the two men spent over two years together, moving from one boarding house to another. Led by Yun, who was a Christian, they studied the English Bible at church on Sundays. Between his graduation from Yonhi College in 1941 and his departure for studies in Japan in 1942, Yun bound three copies of his handwritten poems, keeping one for himself, giving another to his mentor Yang-ha Lee (이양하), and the third to Jeong. When Jeong was forced into military service in 1944 he entrusted Yun's handwritten collection to his mother in Gwangyang (광양) for safekeeping. The two copies held by Yun and Lee Yang-ha were eventually lost, but Jeong's copy remained preserved, wrapped in silk and stored in a jar beneath the floorboards of his family home. In 1948, he combined this copy with some of Yun's poems that had been kept by Cheo-jung Gang (강처중), a schoolmate of Yun Dong-ju from Yonhi College, resulting in Jeong being able to publish a posthumous collection of 31 of Yun's poems.

After Yun's death in 1945 Jeong took on the pen name "Baekyeong (백영)" – meaning "White Shadow" – in an effort to remember Yun's poem of the same name, and regarded his preserving of Yun's handwritten collection Sky, Wind, Star, and Poem (하늘과 바람과 별과 시, 1948) and later bringing it to the public as his greatest achievement. The two men gained a family connection a decade after Yun's death when Yun's younger brother Il-ju Yun (윤일주/尹一柱) married Jeong's younger sister Deok-hui Jeong (정덕희), with Jeong playing the role of matchmaker.

Jeong worked tirelessly to promote Yun's poetry in schools, and in 1968 he supported the establishment of a Yun Dong-ju memorial by donating the prize money he received from the Korea Book Author Award (한국출판문화상 저작상) and the Oesol Award (외솔상).

== Honors ==
- 1967: Korea Book Author Award (한국출판문화상 저작상)
- 1978: Oesol Award (외솔상)
- 1980: Samil Prize (3.1 문화상)
- 1991: Eun-gwan (Silver Crown) Order of Cultural Merit, Republic of Korea Medal (은관 문화 훈장)

== Publications ==
- Collection of Korean Literature Manuscripts (국문학산고, 1954)
- Dictionary of Sijo (시조문학사전, 1959)
- The Ocean of Classics (고전의 바다, 1977) (Co-authored by O-young Lee)
- Theories of Korean Classical Poetry (한국고전시가론, 1976)
- Reappreciation of Korean Classics (한국고전의 재인식, 1979)
- Theories and Methods of Korean Classical Literature (한국고전문학의 이론과 방법, 1999)
- The Study of Korean Poetic Literature (한국 시가문학의 탐, 1999)
- The Study of Korean Narrative Literature (한국 서사문학의 탐구, 1999)
- The World of Korean Literary Authors ( 한국문학 작가의 세계, 1999)
- Theories of Korean Classical Poetry (한국고전시가론, 1999)
- Korean Pansori (한국의 판소리, 1999)
- Words Standing with the Winds (바람을 부비고 서있는 말들, 1999)
- The Backwaters of Life and Scholarship (인생과 학문의 뒤안길, 1999)

== Translations ==
Records of Sea Voyages by Choe Bu

== Annotated Editions ==
- The Cloud Dream of the Nine (구운몽) by Man-jung Kim
- Baebijang-jeon (배비장전) by Unknown Author
- Onggojip-jeon (옹고집전) by Unknown Author

== See also ==
- Yun Dong-ju
