= Kang Shin-jae =

South Korean writer (1924–2001)

- Hangul: 강신재
- Hanja: 康信哉
- RR: Gang Sinjae
- MR: Kang Sinjae

Kang Shin-Jae (Korean: 강신재; Hanja: 康信哉; 8 May 1924 – 12 May 2001) was a female novelist, essayist and playwright of Korea. She graduated from Kyunggi Girls' High School. She entered Ewha Womans University, but dropped out of college after her second year.

She started her career as a writer in 1949 on the recommendation of Kim Dong-ni, publishing short stories "Face" (얼굴) and "Jeong Suni" (정순이). Her major works included the novels Dandellions of Imjin River (임진강의 민들레), Waves (파도), Today and Tomorrow (오늘과 내일), short story collections Young Zelkova Tree (젊은 느티나무), Journey (여정), and essay collection Sandcastle (모래성). She published romantic stories like "The Tribulation of Mr. Pyo" (표 선생 수난기) and "Young Zelkova Tree" (젊은 느티나무), which depict illicit love stories that were very extreme at that time. Most of her novels discuss breaking social morals and conventions and the principle subject matter was the eternal triangle and adultery. She was awarded the Korean Writers' Association Award (한국문인협회상) in 1959 and the Female Writers' Award (여성문학상) in 1967.

"Young Zelkova Tree" is a love story between step-siblings (Hyunkyu and Sookhee). A love letter causes them to start to have a secret love affair. They feel happy and also fearful about the relationship. Sookhee leaves Hyunkyu because she cannot bear the situation anymore. However they meet again under the zelkova tree and promise to love despite all their obstacles.

"Young Zelkova Tree" was made into a movie directed by Lee Sunggu in 1968. The leading actors were Shin Seong-il and Moon Hee.

== Education ==
- Hamgyŏngnamdo Wŏnsan Ch'ŏnma Elementary School (함경남도 원산 천마보통학교)
- Kyŏngsŏng Tŏksu Primary School (경성 덕수보통학교)
- Kyŏngsŏng Girls' High School (경성 여자고등보통학교)
- Kyŏngsŏng Ewha Womans University (경성 이화여자전문학교) Dropout

== Award ==
- 1997: Samil Prize
