= Cha Bumseok =

South Korean playwright (1924–2006)

- Hangul: 차범석
- Hanja: 車凡錫
- RR: Cha Beomseok
- MR: Ch'a Pŏmsŏk

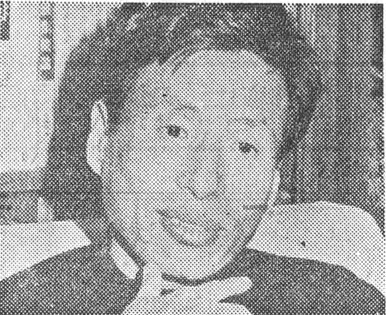
Cha Bumseok in 1971

Cha Bumseok (Korean: 차범석; Hanja: 車凡錫; 1924 – 2006) was a Korean playwright and director.

== Biography ==
He was born in 1924 in Mokpo. Before the Liberation, he worked as a teacher and recruited by force to join the Japanese military. After Korea became independent, he went to a college in 1946 and organized an on-campus community named “Theater Art Study Group” to start his career in the theater field. He debuted as playwright with Milju (밀주 Moonshine) that was selected as a runner-up for the Chosun Ilbo New Writer's Contest in 1955, and the following year, Kwihyang (귀향 Returning Home) was selected for the Chosun Ilbo New Writer's Contest in 1956. With a view to popularizing plays, he founded a troupe, “Sanha,” in 1963, playing a role as the president of the theater, playwright and director. Since 1965, he has taught at universities as a professor. He served as the president of the National Academy of Arts of Republic of Korea and the president of the Korea Culture and Arts Education Service. He died of cancer at the age of 82 in 2006.

== Writing ==
Cha Bumseok is well known for his realistic representation succeeding Yoo Chijin. He is a post-war writer who went through the Korean War in his twenties and reflected social issues in his works.

For him, the writer's consciousness of depicting reality truthfully through a realistic representation was the key to his works. He critically dealt with social issues in Korea after the war until he founded the troupe “Sanha” in 1963. The most representative works are Bulmoji (불모지 Wasteland; 1957) and Sanbul (산불 Burning Mountain). Wasteland depicts the unstable society right after the war in the form of conflicts between the older and the younger generations and their collapse. Burning Mountain describes the violence of the war combined with people's desire. It is a story about a young man who loses his hope because of the Korean War as opposed to the lustful desires around him. It describes the devastating reality of the national division and ideological conflicts.

After he founded the theater company to popularize plays in 1963, his plays were transformed from critically exposing social conflicts to exploring national sentiment and inner world of people. One of his major works, Hakiyeo, sarangilera (학이여, 사랑일레라 Crane, It Is Love; 1981), clearly shows this transformation. The story is based on a myth about Samhakdo (meaning three crane island), where three girls became cranes and turned into three islands after they failed in their love. This work deals with Korea's traditional ideas and emotion as well as exploring ideal values people try to seek such as truth, beauty, virtue, wisdom, justice and righteousness.

== Works ==
(1) Complete Works

《차범석 전집》 1–8, 태학사, 2018 / Cha Beomseok jeonjip (Complete Works of Cha Bumseok) 1–8, Taehaksa, 2018

(2) Collection of Plays

《껍질이 째지는 아픔 없이는》, 정신사, 1960 / KKeopjili jjaejineun apeum eopsineun (Without the Pain of Breaking the Shell), Jeongsinsa, 1960

《대리인》, 선명문화사, 1969 / Daeriin (Representative), Seonmyeongmunhwasa, 1969.

《환상여행》, 어문각, 1975 / Hwansangyeohaeng (Fantasy Travel), Eomungak, 1975.

《학이여, 사랑일레라》, 어문각, 1982 / Hakiyeo, sarangilera (Crane, It Is Love), Eomungak, 1982.

《식민지의 아침》, 학고방, 1992 / Sikminjieui achim (Morning of Colony), Hankkobang, 1992.

《통곡의 땅》, 가람기획, 2000 / Tongkokeui ttang (Land of Wailing), Karam, 2000.

《옥단어!》, 푸른사상, 2003 / Okdaneo! (Okdan!), Pureunsasang, 2003.

(3) Review

《동시대의 연극인식》, 범우사, 1987 / Dongsideaeui yeongeukinsik (Awareness of Contemporary Play), Beomusa, 1987.

《한국소극장연극사》, 연극과 인간, 2004 / Hankuksogeukjangyeonkeuksa (History of Korean Play in Small Theaters), Yeonkeukkwa Ingan, 2004

(4) Collection of Essays

《거부하는 몸짓으로 사랑했노라》, 범우사, 1984 / Geobuhaneun momjiseuro saranghaetnora (I Loved You with My Gesture Denying It), Beomusa, 1984.

《목포행 완행열차의 추억》, 융성출판사, 1994 / Mokpohaeng wanhaengyeolchaeui chueok (Memories of Slow Train for Mokpo), Yungseong, 1994.

(5) Autobiography

《예술가의 삶》, 혜화당, 1993 / Yesulgaeui sam (Life of an Artist), Hyehwadang, 1993.

《떠도는 산하》, 형제문화, 1998 / Ddeodoneun sanha (Wandering Nature), Hyeongjemunhwa, 1998.

== Works in Translation ==
≪산불≫, 오늘의 한국 문학, 1999 / “Burning Mountain” in Korean Literature Today, Winter 1999, The Korean Center International P.E.N, 1999.

≪산불≫, 1962 /“Burning Mountain” in Modern Korean Drama, Columbia University Press, 2009.

≪산불≫, THÉÂTRE CORÉEN CONTEMPORAIN, Imago, 2006.

== Awards ==
- 1956: New Writer's Contest with Returning Home
- 1962: Mokpo Culture Award
- 1970: Korea Culture and Arts Award (Play)
- 1981: Korea Theater Festival (Play, Crane, It is Love)
- 1982: National Academy of Arts Award
- 1983: Dongrang Theater Award
- 1991: Korean Literature Award (Main prize, Morning of Colony)
- 1993: Lee Haerang Theater Award
- 1997: Seoul Culture Award
- 2005: Samil Prize
