= Pahk Yon-hee =

South Korean author (1918–2008)

- Hangul: 박연희
- Hanja: 朴淵禧
- RR: Bak Yeonhui
- MR: Pak Yŏnhŭi

Pahk Yon-hee (Korean: 박연희; 1918–2008) was a South Korean author. Though his early works focus on themes of futility and decadence, his works after the Korean War demonstrate a marked shift towards denouncing the irrationality of society and encompassing historical novels as well. His representative works include the 1956 short story “Jeungin” (증인 Witness), the 1958 novel Geu yeojaui yeonin (그 여자의 연인 The Man She Loved), and the 1975 novel Hong Gildong (홍길동 Hong Gildong).

== Biography ==
Pahk was born in 1918 in Hamhung, South Hamgyong Province in what is now North Korea. He made his debut in 1944 with the short story “Jorangmal” (조랑말 Pony) and after liberation from Japanese colonial rule in 1945, he managed an orchard. In 1946, he went to South Korea and worked as an editor for magazines such as Baengmin (백민 Pure Subjects), Jayu segye (자유세계 Free World), and Jayu munhak (자유문학 Free Literature). In the same year he went to South Korea, he debuted the short story “Ssal” (쌀 Rice) and officially began his literary career, continuing with the publication of two short stories in 1948 —“Gomok” (고목 Old Tree) and “Sampalseon” (삼팔선 The 38th Parallel)—along with the short story “Saebyeok” (새벽 Dawn) in the 1953 anthology Jeonseon munhak (전선문학 Literature of the Frontlines) published by the Army War Writers Group (yukgun jonggun jakgadan) in the midst of the Korean War. In 1958, he began working as the deputy head of the culture division of the Dong-A Ilbo and in 1962, he started working as the senior editor of the press office of the Korea Electric Power Corporation. During that time, he also published “Jeungin” in 1956 and Geu yeojaui yeonin in 1958. In the 1960s, he began publishing works in the stylistic vein of realism, such as “Banghwang” (방황 Wandering) in 1962 and “Byeonmo” (변모 Transformation) in 1965, in order to denounce the inhumane reality and irrational society that encircled him. He began to shift towards writing historical novels in the 1970s, with epic novels such as Hong Gildong in 1975. He also published two other books throughout the 1980s, with Millansidae (민란시대 Age of Insurrection) and Juin eomneun dosi (주인 없는 도시 City Without an Owner)—both published in 1988 and evidence of his great activity even in his aging years. He served as the advisor for the Korea Writers Association in 1997 and died in 2008 from old age. He received awards such as the Association of Freedom Writers Award in 1960 (자유문학가협회상), the National Academy of Arts Award in 1983, and the Republic of Korea’s Eungwan Order of Cultural Merit in 2005.

== Writing ==
=== Changes in repertoire ===
Pahk Yon-Hee’s works can generally be divided into three distinct periods: early, middle, and later writings. His early writings are characterized by a strong tendency towards futility and decadence, with his 1948 short story “Gomok” as the most representative example. His middle period writings actively criticize societal realities, whether it is criticizing Syngman Rhee’s dictatorial regime in the 1956 short story “Jeungin,” the corruption of human nature under equally corrupt surroundings in the 1958 “Hwanmyeol” (환멸 Disillusionment), or the depiction of the anguish and agony of the student soldiers of Joseon in the 1962 short story “Banghwang.” In his later writings, represented by historical novels such as the 1975 Hong Gildong, the 1978 Yeomyeonggi (여명기 The Beginning of a New Era), and the 1988 Juin eomneun dosi, Pahk explores the past in order to closely examine the present and attempts to excavate a new humanity for the future. His 1978 novel, Hachonilga (하촌일가 A Family in Rosy Cloud Village), is also an important later work in his repertoire that describes North Korean society after liberation in 1945 through the testimony of a young boy.

=== Thematic consciousness ===
Pahk Yon-Hee’s works generally denounce contemporary political irrationalities and societal evils in order to cultivate a sense of resistance. From October 1954 to February 1955, his work, Gamyeonui hoehwa (가면의 회화 Conversation of Masks), was serialized in the Pyeonghwa Newspaper in which he criticized politics and religion. When the newspaper company demanded that Pahk write a popular love story, he suspended his writings of his own accord —an instance that well demonstrates his consciousness towards writing. Moreover, his literature combines a humanistic perspective of the world along with realism in order to manifest a genuine humanity, creating a unique world view. In particular, the humanism portrayed within his works, heavily influenced by Russian literature, is not limited to representing the daily lives of ordinary people, but also emphasizes a sense of social consciousness.

=== Representative works ===
His 1956 short story, “Jeungin,” deals with the dictatorial regime of the Liberty Party and the political oppression resulting from stringent anti-communism ideology. Among novels published in the 1950s, “Jeungin” is the only one that directly and bravely denounces the dictatorial nature of former President Syngman Rhee’s rule—along with being the sole work to concretely portray the Sasaoip gaeheonpadong (Selective Constitutional Reform) incident. The protagonist “Jun” is told by his newspaper company to resign after writing an article that opposes the Selective Constitutional Reform, as the article could be advantageous to the leading opposition party. Shortly afterwards, he takes on a student named Hyeon Il-u as a boarder but because of Hyeon Il-u, he is arrested on suspicion of being a spy and holding secret rendezvous. Jun is held in solitary confinement and then subjected to severe interrogation. When he starts vomiting up large amounts of blood in the midst of questioning, he is finally set free. As he lies on his sickbed, he cannot stop wondering why he was imprisoned and what reasons he possibly has left for living. In this manner, “Jeungin” portrays the sufferings of regular people at the hands of authority’s cruel and merciless tyranny in order to reveal contemporary society’s hypocrisy and senselessness. In his 1958 novel, Geu yeojaui yeonin, he portrays the joys and sorrows of life by tracing an intellectual’s complicated romance within an absurd reality. Geu yeojaui yeonin centers around Im Gyuju, managing editor of Goryeo Publishers and a novelist. While his own wife is suffering from tuberculosis, he begins affairs with Song Gyeongwon, the second wife of the CEO of his publishing company, and Gang Seonok, the wife of his poet friend that defected to North Korea. He also rejects the romantic advances of Jang Seonghye, another employee that works at the same publishing company as him. In the midst of this situation, the serialized newspaper novel that he is writing is accused of having a “thought problem.” Though Im Gyuju is summoned by the authorities, he is freed thanks to the help of his CEO and Song Gyeongwon. Shortly afterwards, Im Gyuju begins running a co-op farm and as he rides a bus, he remembers the faces of all the women that he loved. While Im may wander when it comes to the matters of love, he does not stop there and the novel states that “democracy is not measuring happiness through money”—ultimately criticizing an environment where money and happiness are connected. The novel emphasizes that capitalism is not the same thing as democracy and through a diverse set of characters, calls for the construction of a democratic society headed by the people.

== Works ==
=== Short story collections ===
- 《무사호동》, 학원사, 1957. / Musahodong (Warrior Hodong), Hagwonsa, 1957.
- 《방황》, 정음사, 1964. / Banghwang (Wandering), Jeongeumsa, 1964.
- 《밤에만 자라는 돌》, 대운당, 1979. / Bameman jaraneun dol (The Rock That Only Grows at Night), Daeundang, 1979.

=== Novels ===
- 《그 여자의 연인》, 삼성출판사, 1972. / Geu yeojaui yeonin (The Man She Loved), Samseong, 1972.
- 《홍길동》, 갑인출판사, 1975. / Hong Gildong (Hong Gildong), Gabin, 1975.
- 《여명기》, 동아일보사, 1978. / Yeomyeonggi (The Beginning of a New Era), Dong-A Ilbo, 1978.
- 《하촌일가》, 대운당, 1978. / Hachonilga (A Family in Rosy Cloud Village), Daeundang, 1978.
- 《주인 없는 도시》, 정음사, 1988. / Juin eomneun dosi (City Without an Owner), Jeongeumsa, 1988.
- 《민란시대》, 문학사상사, 1988. / Millansidae (Age of Insurrection), Munsa, 1988.
- 《왕도》, 제삼기획, 1992. / Wangdo (The Rule of Royalty), Jesamgihoek, 1992.
- 《황제 연산군》, 명문당, 1994. / Hwangje yeonsangun (Emperor Yeon Sangun), Myungmundang, 1994.

== Works in translation ==
- 《그 여자의 연인》, 삼성출판사, 1972. / The Man She Loved, Crescent Publications, 1986
- 《세월: 현대남조선소설선》 / 歲月: 現代南朝鮮小說選 (朴渕禧 et al. 外), 新興書房, 1967

== Awards ==
- 1960: Association of Freedom Writers Award (자유문학가협회상)
- 1982: The Republic of Korea's Bogwan Order of Cultural Merit
- 1983: National Academy of Arts Award
- 1996: Samil Prize
- 2004: Republic of Korea's Eungwan Order of Cultural Merit
