= Hwang Sun-won =

South Korean writer (1915–2000)

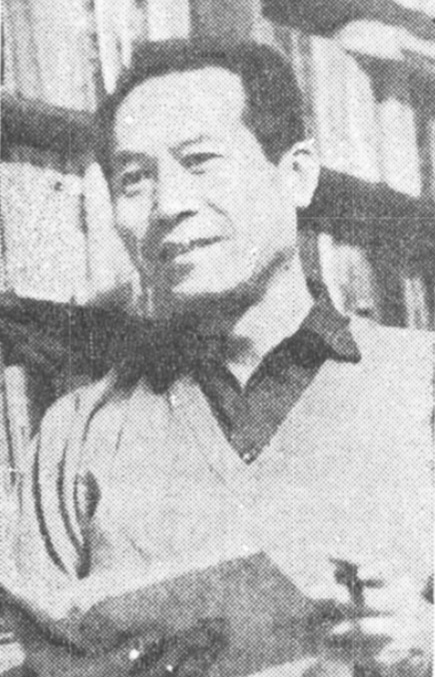
- Writing career
- Language: Korean

- Korean name
- Hangul: 황순원
- Hanja: 黃順元
- RR: Hwang Sunwon
- MR: Hwang Sunwŏn

Hwang Sun-wŏn (Korean: 황순원; March 26, 1915 – September 14, 2000) was a Korean short story writer, novelist, and poet.

== Life ==
Hwang was born while Korea was under Japanese colonial rule in Taedong County, South Pyongan, in modern-day North Korea. Hwang Sunwon made his literary debut as a middle school student with the publication in 1931 of his poems “My Dream” (Naui kkum) and “Fear Not, My Son” (Adeura museowo malla) in Eastern Light (Donggwang). Hwang graduated from Waseda University in Japan with a degree in English. During his time at Waseda he founded a theater group called Tokyo Students’ Group for the Arts (Donggyeong haksaeng yesuljwa), along with fellow students Lee Haerang and Kim Dongwon. In November 1934, Hwang Sunwon published his first poetry collection, Wayward Songs (Bangga). Following the division of Korea he lived in the South, becoming a professor at Kyunghee University.

== Work ==
Hwang published his first story in 1937 and continued writing through the 1980s; during his long literary career, Hwang Sunwon observed firsthand the suffering of ordinary Koreans under many different forms of oppression: colonialism, ideological strife, Korean War, industrialization, military dictatorships. What he sought to capture was the resilience of the Korean spirit even in times of adversity, rather than the adversity itself, and the discovery of love and goodwill in the most unlikely of circumstances.

Although he wrote many volumes of poetry and eight novels, Hwang achieved his greatest acclaim as the author of short fiction, which was regarded as the premiere literary genre through most of the twentieth century in Korea and Hwang was noted, particularly early in his career, for refusing to write in Japanese. (Yom Sang-seop was another example of this stance). Hwang is the author of some of the best-known stories in the modern Korean literary canon, including “Stars” (1940), “Old Man Hwang” (1942), “The Old Potter” (1944), “Cloudburst” (1952), “Cranes” (1953) and “Rain Shower”(1959).

In “Cranes” (Hak), for example, two childhood friends now on opposite sides of the ideological divide, find a way to rediscover their love for each other, and “The Shower” (Sonagi) highlights the pathos and beauty of love between two children. Children, in fact, often appear in Hwang Sunwon’s short stories as vessels of purity. “The Swamp” (Neup) and “The Stars” also manifest concern with the ephemerality of childhood.

Hwang began writing novels in the 1950s, his most successful being Trees on a Slope (1960), which depicts the lives of three soldiers during the Korean War. Sunlight, Moonlight (1962–65) depicts the lives of members of the former untouchable class in urban Seoul. The Moving Castle (1968–72) depicts the complex and problematic synthesis of Western and indigenous cultures in rapidly modernizing Korea. It is also one of the few depictions in fiction of gender roles in Korean shamanism.

== Tribute ==
On 26 March 2015, Google celebrated Hwang's 100th birthday with a Google Doodle.

== Book-length Works in Translation ==
- The Stars and Other Korean Short Stories, trans. Edward W. Poitras. Hong Kong: Heineman Asia, 1980.
- Trees on the Cliff : A Novel of Korea and Two Stories, trans. Chang Wang-rok. New York: Larchmont Publications Ltd, 1980.
- The Book of Masks: Stories by Hwang Sun-won, ed. Martin Holman. London: Readers International, 1989.
- Shadows of a Sound: Stories by Hwang Sun-won, ed. Martin Holman. San Francisco: Mercury House, 1990.
- Sunlight, Moonlight, trans. Sol Sun-bong. Seoul: Si-sa-yong-o-sa, 1990.
- The Descendants of Cain, trans. Suh Ji-moon and Julie Pickering. London: Routledge. 1997.
- Trees on a Slope, trans. Bruce and Ju-Chan Fulton. Honolulu: University of Hawai'i Press, 2005.
- Lost Souls: Stories, trans. Bruce and Ju-Chan Fulton. New York: Columbia University Press, 2010.
- The Moving Fortress, trans. Bruce and Ju-Chan Fulton. Portland, Maine: MerwinAsia, 2016.

== Works in Korean ==
Short Story Collections

- Stories by Hwang Sun-won (Hwang Sun-won tanpyunjip, 1940)
- The Dog of Crossover Village (Mongneomi maeurui gae, 1948),
- Wild Geese (Gireogi, 1951)
- Acrobats (Gogyesa, 1952)
- Cranes (1953)
- Lost Souls (Ireobeorin saramdeul, 1958)
- Time for You and Me Alone (Neowa namanui sigan, 1964)
- Masks (Tal, 1980)

Novels

- Living with the Stars (Byeolgwa gachi salda, 1950)
- Descendants of Cain (Kain ui huye, 1954)
- Human Grafting (Ingan jeommok, 1957)
- The Moving Fortress (Umjigineun seong, 1973)
- Sunlight, Moonlight (Irweol, 1975)
- Dice of the Gods (Shin tul ui chusawi, 1982)

== Awards ==
- 1955: Asia Freedom Literature Prize
- 1961: Academy of Arts Award
- 1966: Samil Prize
- 1983: Korean Literature Award
- 1987: Inchon Award
