= Samil Prize =

First academic and cultural award of South Korea

- Date: 1959
- Country: South Korea
- Presented by: Samil Foundation
- First award: 1960
- Website: Samil Foundation

- Samil Prize
- Hangul: 3·1문화상
- Hanja: 3·1文化賞
- RR: 3·1munhwasang
- MR: 3·1munhwasang

The Samil Prize (Korean: 3·1문화상) is the first privately awarded academic and cultural award of South Korea. The award was founded by brothers Lee Jeong-rim and Lee Jeong-ho, who also founded the Korea Petrochemical Ind. Co., Ltd. in the aftermath of the Korean War. The name Samil is directly translated from the words "three" "one" which refers to the March First Movement which occurred during the Korean independence movement. Administration of the award changed in 1966 to the Samil Foundation.

== Laureates ==
Year	Humanities and Social Sciences	Natural Sciences	Art	Technology	Technology and Engineering	Labor	Community Service	Special Prize
1960	Lee Hye-gu (이혜구); Seoul National University	–	Do Sang-bong (도상봉); National Academy of Arts of the Republic of Korea member	Choi Kyung-yeol (최경열); Korean Society of Civil Engineers; Lee Jong-geun (이종근); Central Industrial Research Institute; Ji Cheol-geun (지철근); Seoul National University; Park Chun-myeong (박춘명); Park Chun-myeong Architectural Research Institute	–	Kim Chang-kwon (김창권); Kim Yong-tae (김용태); Kim Geum-do (김금도); Kim Young-ho (김영호)	–	–
1961	–	Lee Woo-joo (이우주); Yonsei University	Yoon Seok-joong (윤석중); Saebakhoe CEO	Song Gye-beom (송계범); National Institute of Industrial Science and Technology	–	Oh Jeong-hwa (오정화); Park Moon (박문); Kwak Chun-man (곽춘만); Park Chun-se (박춘세)	–	–
1962	Lee Seung-nyeong (이숭녕); Seoul National University	Lee Moon-ho (이문호); Seoul National University; Lee Dong-nyeong (이동녕); Seoul National University	Yeom Sang-seop (염상섭); National Academy of Arts lifetime member	Lee Beom-sun (이범순); National Institute of Industrial Science and Technology; Kim Man-jong (김만종); Anthracite High-Temperature Industrial Co	–	Lee Seon-shin (이선신); Lee Young-bok (이영복); Jeong Gi-jun (정기준); Kang Ki-soo (강기수); Jang Don-sik (장돈식); Lee Soon-ae (이순애)	–	–
1963	Yoo Hong-ryeol (유홍렬); Seoul National University; Kim Hyung-gyu (김형규); Seoul National University	Hong Seok-gi (홍석기); Yonsei University	Lee Sang-beom (이상범); Hongik University	Kim Yu-seon (김유선); Gangwon Coal Mine	–	Kim Chang-ki (김창기); Kim Pil-ae (김필애); Baek Geun-sik (백근식); Song Seok-do (송석도)	–	–
1964	–	Lee Seong-ho (이성호); Seoul National University	Kim Gyeong-seung (김경승); Ewha Womans University	Hyun Shin-kyu (현신규); Rural Development Administration	–	Lee Jae-song (이재송); An In-ae (안인애); Cheon Du-ho (천두호); Kim Byeong-ryeol (김병렬); Jo Tae-ho (조태호); Nam Sang-don (남상돈)	–	–
1965	Kim Won-yong (김원용); Seoul National University	–	Kim Eun-ho (김은호); Soodo Women's College of Education	Choi Hyeong-seop (최형섭); Korea Atomic Energy Research Institute	–	Kim I-man (김이만); Kim Bok-man (김복만); Choi Jong-jin (최종진); Im Soon-do (임순도)	–	–
1966	Kim Dong-wook (김동욱); Yonsei University	Park Byeong-hee (박병희); Rural Development Administration; Jeon Jong-hwi (전종휘); Catholic University of Korea	Hwang Sun-won (황순원); Kyung Hee University	–	–	Bok Tae-bong (복태봉); Kim Jeong-ju (김정주); Kim Young-seo (김영서); Gong Min-gil (공민길)	–	–
1967	Yoo Chang-gyun (유창균); Daegu University		Kim Dongni (김동리); Seorabeol University of Arts	–	–	–	–	–
1968	Kwon Lee-hyuk (권이혁); Seoul National University		Kim In-seung (김인승); Ewha Womans University	Kim Ro-su (김로수); Daewoo Heavy Industries	–	Kim Gwi-geun (김귀근)	–	–
1969	Baek Un-ha (백운하); Seoul National University		Park Young-sun (박영선); Seorabeol University of Arts	Kim Jae-geun (김재근); Seoul National University	–	Park Young-rae (박영래)	–	–
1970	National museums (국립박물관)		Park Du-jin (박두진); Woosuk University	–	–	Kim Seong-geun (김성근)	–	–
1971	Kim Jong-oh (김종오); Korea University		Kim Ki-chang (김기창); Soodo Women's College of Education	Korea Glass Industry	–	Bae Cheo-ja (배처자)	–	–
1972	Nam Gwang-woo (남광우); Chung-Ang University		Jo Yeon-hyeon (조연현); Dongguk University	Park Dal-jo (박달조); University of Colorado	–	Jang Jae-jin (장재진); Kim Ki-ho (김기호)	–	–
1973	Kwon Young-dae (권영대); Seoul National University		An Sugil (안수길); Novelist	–	–	Choi Seong-deok (최성덕)	–	–
1974	Go Gwang-wook (고광욱); Seoul National University		Kim Dong-jin (composer) (김동진); Kyung Hee University	Ahn Byeong-seong (안병성); Korea Institute of Science and Technology	–	Min Dong-gi (민동기); Kim Dae-ho (김대호)	–	–
1975	Kim Jae-kwan (김재관); KAIST		Chun Kyung-ja (천경자); Painter	Park Hyun-woo (박현우); Korea Cast Iron Pipe Industry	–	Yoo Yoon-geol (유윤걸)	–	–
1976	Kim Byeong-cheol (김병철); Chung-Ang University		Baek Cheol (백철); Korean branch of the International PEN Club	–	–	–	–	–
1977	Lee Yong-gak (이용각); Catholic University of Korea		Baek Seong-hee (백성희); National Theater Company	Jeong Man-young (정만영); Korea Institute of Science and Technology	–	Hong Jong-sik (홍종식); Lee Byeong-rin (이병린)	–	–
1978	Jeong Moon-ki (정문기); Ministry of Culture and Tourism		Lee Jun (이준); Ewha Womans University	–	–	Jeong Sang-seop (정장섭)	–	–
1979	Lee Young-gyun (이영균); Seoul National University		Kwon Soon-hyung (권순형); Seoul National University	Kim Chun-soo (김춘수); Korea Institute of Science and Technology	–	Gasan Cooperative Village (가산협동마을)	–	–
1980	Jeong Byeong-uk (정병욱); Seoul National University		Moh Youn-sook (모윤숙); PEN Club	Chae Young-bok (채영복); Korea Institute of Science and Technology	–	Park Do-hyun (박도현)	–	–
1981	Lee Seung-won (이승원); Nuclear Industry Association		Kim Seong-tae (김성태); Seoul National University	Dongyang Cement Industry Co., Ltd.	–	Jeong Gye-hoon (정계훈)	–	–
1982	Song Hee-seong (송희성); Seoul National University		Kim Dal-seong (김달성); Dankook University	Min Gye-sik (민계식); Hanwha Ocean	–	Hong Yun-hwa (홍윤화)	–	–
1983	Shin Yong-ha (신용하); Seoul National University		Choe Jeong-hui (최정희); Samcheolli	Jang Seong-do (장성도); KAIST	–	Choi Jeong-ho (최정호)	–	–
1984	Jo Gyu-cheol (조규철); Catholic University of Korea		Pak Hwasong (박화성); National Academy of Arts senior member	Lee Jae-sook (이재숙); Kolon Electric Co., Ltd.	–	Shin Seok-gyun (신석균)	–	–
1985	Lee Ki-Moon (이기문); Seoul National University		Yu Kyung-chae (유경채); Seoul National University	An Su-han (안수한); Seoul National University	–	Byun Jae-rak (변재락)	–	–
1986	Yoon Tak-gu (윤탁구); Korea Cancer Center Hospital		Kim Won (김원); Hongik University	Lee Se-jung (이세중); Hanwha Ocean	–	Yu Won-sang (유원상)	–	–
1987	Lee Kwang-rin (이광린); Sogang University		Lee Ju-hong (이주홍); Busan National Fisheries University	Yang Jae-gyu (양재규); Samsung Electronics	–	Kim Young-soo (김영수)	–	–
1988	Sim Sang-cheol (심상철); KAIST		Jung Hansuk (정한숙); Korea University	Jang Nak-yong (장낙용); Hyundai Motor Company	–	Yang Ki-ho (양기호)	–	–
1989	Choi Sang-soo (최상수); Institute of Korean Folklore		Han Moo-sook (한무숙); National Academy of Arts member	Lee Ju-hyung (이주형); Samsung Electronics	–	–	Kim Woo-hyun (posthumous) (김우현); Myunghwiwon Social Welfare Corporation	–
1990	Jo Seong-ho (조성호); Korea University		Cho Byung-hwa (조병화); Korean Writers Association	Jang Se-chang (장세창); Icheon Electric Co., Ltd.	–	–	Kim Yun-dong (김윤동); Andong Rehabilitation Center Social Welfare Corporation	–
1991	Jo Seong-sik (조성식); Korea University		Choi Deok-hyu (최덕휴); Kyung Hee University	Park Sung-gyu (박성규); Daewoo Telecom	–	–	Lee Kyung-jae (이경재); Saint Lazarus Village	–
1992	Lee Jae-young (이재영); KAIST		Kim Namjo (김남조); Sookmyung Women's University	Yoo Geon-hee (유건희); GoldStar	–	–	Lee Tai-young (이태영); Korean Family Legal Counseling	–
1993	Jo Gi-jun (조기준); Korea University		Kim Soon-ae (김순애); National Academy of Arts member	Choi Joo (최주); Korea Institute of Science and Technology	–	–	Kim Oh-gon (김오곤); Chungcheongbuk-do Federation of the Korean Senior Citizens Association	–
1994	Lee Chung-hee (이충희); Korea Research Institute of Standards and Science		Kwon Ok-yeon (권옥연); National Academy of Arts member	Lee Chung-gu (이충구); Hyundai Motor Company	–	–	–	–
1995	–	Lee Woo-young (이우영); Seoul National University	Kim Dong-won (1916) (김동원); National Academy of Arts member	Lee Seung-gyu (이승규); Samsung Electronics	–	–	–	–
1996	Ahn Byeong-hee (안병희); Seoul National University	Choe Jong-sul(최종술); Yonsei University	Pahk Yon-hee (박연희); National Academy of Arts member	Park Geon-yu (박건유); Korea Institute of Science and Technology	–	–	–	–
1997	Kim Yong-jik (김용직); Seoul National University	Park Chun-sik (박춘식); University of Ulsan	Kang Shin-jae (강신재); National Academy of Arts member	–	–	–	–	–
1998	Yu Dong-sik (유동식); Yonsei University	Kim Hwa-taek (김화택); Chonnam National University	Park Min-jong (박민종); National Academy of Arts member	Jeong Yeong-tae (정영태); Korea Petrochemical Ind. Co., Ltd.	–	–	–	–
1999	Yoon Ki-joong (윤기중); Yonsei University	Kim Jong-jin (김종진); KAIST	Yu Hyun-mok (유현목); National Academy of Arts member	Kim Jeong-yeop (김정엽); Korea Institute of Science and Technology	–	–	–	–
2000	Lee Ki-dong (이기동); Dongguk University	Jeong Kyung-hoon (정경훈); KAIST	Park No-soo (박노수); National Academy of Arts member	Kim Ho-gi (김호기); KAIST	–	–	–	–
2001	Kim Young-mo (김영모); Chung-Ang University	Kim Yong-hae (김용해); KAIST	Hong Yun-Sook (홍윤숙); National Academy of Arts member	Park Hang-gu (박항구); SK Hynix	–	–	–	–
2002	Nam Gi-sim (남기심); National Institute of Korean Language	Eom Jeong-in (엄정인); Korea University	Ahn Hyeong-il (안형일); Seoul National University	Lee Deok-chul (이덕출); Inha University	–	–	–	–
2003	–		Jeon Sook-hee (전숙희); National Academy of Arts member	Son Wook (손욱); Samsung Advanced Institute of Technology	–	–	–	–
2004	Yoo Bong-hak (유봉학); Hanshin University	Yoon Ki-hyun (윤기현); Yonsei University	Park Seok-hwan (박석환); Painter	–	–	–	–	–
2005	Choi Jae-seok (최재석); Korea University	–	Cha Bumseok (차범석); National Academy of Arts member	Kim Young-ha (김영하); Korea Institute of Science and Technology	–	–	–	–
2006	Kim Gwang-sun (김광순); Kyungpook National University	Lee Hae-woong (이해웅); KAIST	Jang Hye-won (장혜원); Ewha Womans University	–	–	–	–	–
2007	Yoo Seong-jun (유성준); Hankuk University of Foreign Studies	Hwang Byeong-guk (황병국); Korea University	Lee O-young (이어령) 중앙일보 상임고문; 문화 창달의 선두주자	Ahn Gyu-hong (안규홍); Korea Institute of Science and Technology	–	–	–	Lee Won-beom (이원범)
2008	Park Woo-hee (박우희); Seoul National University	Jo Bong-rae (조봉래); Korea University	Yoo Hee-young (유희영); Ewha Womans University	Kwon Ik-hyeon (권익현); Hyosung R&D Center	–	–	–	The Dong-A Ilbo (동아일보사)
2009	Go Young-geun (고영근); Seoul National University	Byeon Su-il (변수일); KAIST	Lee Young-ja (이영자); Korean Women Composers Association	Park Jung-hyun (박중현); Seoul National University	–	–	–	Mindan (재일본대한민국민단)
2010	Lee Tae-jin (이태진); Seoul National University	Lee Myung-cheol (이명철); Seoul National University	Lee In-young (이인영); Seoul National University	Shin Dong-sik (신동식); Korea Maritime Technology Co., Ltd.	–	–	–	March 1st Independence Movement Day Commemorative Bonfire Promotion Committee (3·1절기념봉화제추진위원회)
2011	–	Kim Doochul (김두철); Korea Institute for Advanced Study	Jo Soo-ho (조수호); National Academy of Arts member	Kim Moon-han (김문한); Seoul National University	–	–	–	The Chosun Ilbo (조선일보사)
2012	Cheo Jong-go (최종고); Seoul National University	Lee Ik-chun (이익춘); Inha University	Yi Hocheol (이호철); National Academy of Arts member	Lee Chang-geon (이창건); Korea Atomic Energy Agency	–	–	–	–
2013	Lee Han-gu (이한구); Sungkyunkwan University	Lee Ki-hwa (이기화); Seoul National University	Min Kyung-gap (민경갑); Dankook University	Gu Min-sae (구민세); Inha University	–	–	–	Korean Association in Germany (재독한인총연합회)
2014	Nam Poonghyeon (남풍현); Dankook University	Kim Soo-Bong (김수봉); Seoul National University	Won Jeong-su (원정수); Inha University	–	–	–	–	–
2015	Oh Byeong-nam (오병남); Seoul National University	Park Gyu-taek (박규택); Korean Academy of Science and Technology	Na In-yong (나인용); Yonsei University	Lee Dong-ho (이동호); Kyungpook National University	–	–	–	–
2016	Kim Hwa-kyung (김화경); Yeungnam University	Seo Jin-geun (서진근); Yonsei University	Park Man-gyu (박만규); Korea Musical Association	–	–	–	–	–
2017	Kim In-jun (김인준); Seoul National University	Kim Dae-soo (김대수); KAIST	Kim Baek-bong (김백봉); National Academy of Arts member	Seo Seung-woo (서승우); Seoul National University	–	–	–	–
2018	Lee Seung-jae (이승재); Seoul National University	Lee Ho-young (이호영); Seoul National University	–	Seong Yeong-cheol (성영철); Pohang University of Science and Technology	–	–	–	–
2019	–	Kim Byung-yoon (김병윤); Korea Institute of Science and Technology	Park Soo-gil (박수길); Hanyang University	–	Seo Jin-ho (서진호); Seoul National University	–	–	Lee Geon-yeong (이건영); Lee Seok-yeong (이석영); Lee Cheol-young (이철영); Yi Hoeyŏng (이회영); Yi Si-yeong (이시영); Lee Ho-yeong family (이호영); Choi Jae-hyung family (최재형)
2020	Park Hee-byung (박희병); Seoul National University	Kim Jeong-han (김정한); Korea Institute for Advanced Study	Park Jeong-ja (박정자); National Academy of Arts member	–	Jo Dong-woo (조동우); Pohang University of Science and Technology	–	–	–
2021	Lee Seong-gyu (이성규); Seoul National University	Lee Hyo-cheol (이효철); KAIST	Yun Humyong (윤후명); Novelist	–	Ahn Jong-hyun (안종현); Yonsei University	–	–	–
2022	Shim Kyung-ho (심경호); Korea University	Kim Gwang-soo (김광수); Harvard Medical School	Koo Bon-chang (구본창); Photographer	–	Lee Kyung-moo (이경무); Seoul National University	–	–	–
2023	–	Jo Seung-woo (조승우); Yonsei University	Kim Dae-jin (김대진); Korea National University of Arts	–	Song Jae-bok (송재복); Korea University	–	–	–
2024	Kwak Chung-gu (곽충구); Sogang University	Kim Yousoo (김유수); University of Tokyo	Kim Young-jae (김영재); Korean traditional musician	–	Ahn Sung-hoon (안성훈); Seoul National University	–	–	–
2025	Lee Seok-gu (이석구); Yonsei University	Im Dae-sik (임대식); KAIST	Heo Dal-jae (허달재); Uijae Cultural Foundation	–	Sim Sang-jeong (심상정); Korea University	–	–	–

== See also ==
- Inchon Award
- Sudang Award
- Kyung-Ahm Prize
- Korea Science Award
