= Ettore Fiorini =

Italian physicist (1933–2023)

- Born: 19 April 1933; Verona, Italy
- Died: 9 April 2023 (aged 89); Milan, Italy
- Education: University of Milan
- Known for: Experimental particle physics
- Awards: Enrico Fermi Prize (2007); Bruno Pontecorvo Prize (2012)
- Scientific career
- Institutions: University of Milan; CERN; Duke University

Ettore Fiorini (19 April 1933 – 9 April 2023) was an Italian experimental particle physicist. He studied the physics of the weak interaction and was a pioneer in the field of double beta decay. He served as a professor of nuclear and subnuclear physics at the University of Milano-Bicocca.

== Early life ==
Fiorini was born on 19 April 1933 in Verona. His father was the eminent surgeon Enoch Fiorini.

== Career ==
Fiorini graduated in physics from the University of Milan in 1955. After working as a research associate at Duke University from 1959 to 1969, he returned to Milan for the remainder of his academic career, except for a spell in Geneva at CERN (1979–82). He carried out the bulk of his research in Italy at the underground laboratories of Mont Blanc and Gran Sasso.

== Scientific achievements ==
Fiorini had a longstanding research interest in weak interactions and related phenomena. In the 1970s he collaborated with André Lagarrigue to create the Gargamelle detector, a giant bubble chamber at CERN, and with Carlo Rubbia and Riccardo Giacconi on neutrino experiments that contributed to the discovery of weak neutral currents, thereby providing the first empirical test of the electroweak theory.

Fiorini was a pioneering investigator of neutrinoless double beta decay. In the 1960s he proposed and performed the first study of neutrinoless double beta decay (0νββ) in ^{76}Ge using germanium diodes. In subsequent decades he was involved with two far larger collaborations at underground facility of the Laboratori Nazionali del Gran Sasso: the CUORICINO and CUORE studies of ^{130}Te. The results of these experiments have relevance for the study of dark matter and solar axions.

In the 1980s he directed the NUSEX (Nucleon Stability Experiment) investigation of proton decay located in the Mont Blanc underground laboratory. NUSEX helped determine the limits of proton stability, applying innovative methods to correct for the background effects of cosmic rays.

Fiorini also collaborated on the GALLEX project at Gran Sasso that provided the first observations of low-energy neutrinos produced by the initial proton fusion step of the proton-proton chain reaction, confirming that this was the dominant fusion process occurring in the sun.

His other research activities include the development of microbolometers for X-ray spectroscopy and high-precision measurements of the transition energies and lifetimes of nuclei, results which could help measure the mass of antineutrinos.

Fiorini later conducted several archaeometric studies, using non-destructive techniques such as neutron activation analysis to discover the properties of historical materials. He proved, using samples of Napoleon's hair, that the former emperor did not die from arsenic poisoning. Another project demonstrated the provenance of lead ingots from a Roman shipwreck — before repurposing them for the lining of the CUORE detector.

== Death ==
Fiorini died on 9 April 2023, at the age of 89.

== Awards ==
Fiorini received the 2007 Enrico Fermi Prize in recognition for his work on weak neutral currents and solar neutrinos. For his work on neutrinoless double beta decay, he was awarded the 2012 Bruno Pontecorvo Prize. He has been a corresponding member of the Accademia Nazionale dei Lincei since 1988.
