= Gianpaolo Bellini (physicist) =

Italian experimental physicist (1935–2026)

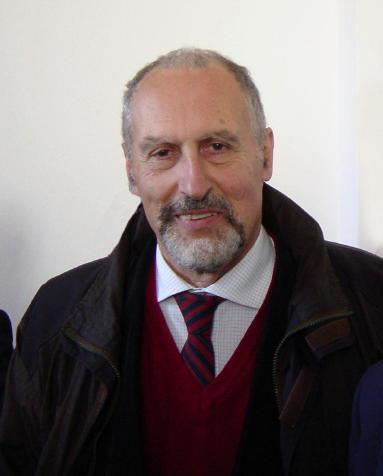
- Born: 12 June 1935; Milan, Italy
- Died: 12 August 2026 (aged 91); Foresto Sparso, Italy
- Known for: Low-background neutrino detection Borexino experiment Silicon active targets Micro-vertex techniques
- Awards: Bruno Pontecorvo Prize (2016); Enrico Fermi Prize (2017); Giuseppe and Vanna Cocconi Prize (2021)
- Scientific career
- Fields: Experimental physics
- Workplaces: University of Milan; Istituto Nazionale di Fisica Nucleare

Gianpaolo Bellini (12 June 1935 – 12 August 2026) was an Italian experimental physicist, who was Emeritus Professor of Physics at the University of Milan and emeritus Scientist of the Istituto Nazionale di Fisica Nucleare (INFN). He is known for pioneering work in low-background neutrino detection and for leading the Borexino experiment at the Gran Sasso National Laboratory, which performed precision spectroscopy of solar neutrinos — including the first direct evidence of the CNO cycle — and measurements of geoneutrinos. Earlier in his career he introduced silicon active targets and micro-vertex techniques that enabled the first lifetime measurements of charmed hadrons at fixed-target experiments.

== Career ==
Bellini held a NATO Fellowship at the École Normale Supérieure d'Orsay (1966–1967). He obtained the Italian Libera Docenza (1967), served as Assistant Professor (1969–1976), and became Full Professor at the University of Milan in 1976; he was a CERN Fellow in 1984–1985. Within INFN he served on the National Council (1973–1983), was a member of the executive committee and vice-president (1983–1989), and chaired the National Computing Committee (1981–1983). He coordinated the INFN national program on applied superconductivity for LEP2 and LHC developments (1993–1999). He directed the University of Milan PhD School in Physics, Astrophysics and Applied Physics (2003–2008).

At the European level he served on the Council of the European Physical Society (1980–1983), and was a member of ECFA and restricted-ECFA (1983–1986). He was a consultant for Italy's first national research assessment (CIVR, 2006). He was a member of the Istituto Lombardo, Accademia di Scienze e Lettere (from 2013) and an honorary member of the Italian Physical Society (from 2010).

== Death ==
Bellini died in Foresto Sparso on 12 August 2026, at the age of 91.

== Research ==
=== High-energy physics ===
From the late 1960s through the 1990s Bellini led joint University of Milan–INFN teams at CERN, IHEP Serpukhov, and Fermilab. He helped establish coherent production on nuclei as a tool to study hadron production mechanisms and resonance properties, introducing the concept of an “active target” based on thin silicon layers. His group built one of the first silicon micro-strip micro-vertex detectors in a large spectrometer (Fermilab E687), enabling precision lifetime measurements and spectroscopy of charmed mesons and baryons and the determination of the lifetime hierarchy in the charm sector.

=== Borexino and low-background neutrino physics ===
Beginning in 1990 Bellini proposed, designed, and led Borexino, an ultra-low-background liquid-scintillator detector at LNGS optimized for sub-MeV solar neutrinos. The collaboration developed radiopurification and assay methods that set benchmarks for intrinsic radiopurity, allowing real-time measurements of pp, 7Be, pep and solar 8B neutrinos; precision tests of the MSW-LMA survival probability from vacuum to matter regimes; and the first direct observation of CNO-cycle neutrinos. Borexino also made competitive measurements of geoneutrinos and set limits on rare processes and non-standard neutrino interactions. Bellini served as Borexino spokesperson from 1990 to 2012 and subsequently as a collaboration and Institutional Board member.

== Technical contributions ==
- Silicon active targets for coherent production studies (CERN and Serpukhov).
- First large-scale micro-vertex detector with silicon micro-strips in a fixed-target spectrometer (Fermilab E687).
- Innovative radiopurification techniques for organic scintillators, enabling Borexino's ultra-low backgrounds.

== Editorial and scientific organization ==
Bellini served as editor at EPJ Plus. He founded the Physics in Collision conference series (editor of the 1981 inaugural volume) and co-founded Heavy Quarks and Leptons (originating as “Heavy Quarks at Fixed Target” in 1993; broadened in 2002). Founder and director during 15 years of the international network ISAPP (International School of Astroparticle Physics), which now includes 37 institutions in 13 countries.

== Honours and recognition ==
- Bruno Pontecorvo Prize (2016), for contributions to low-energy neutrino detection, the realization of Borexino, and its solar and geoneutrino results.
- Enrico Fermi Prize of the Italian Physical Society (2017).
- Giuseppe and Vanna Cocconi Prize of the European Physical Society to the Borexino Collaboration (2021).
- Physics World Top-10 Breakthroughs (2014: detection of solar fusion neutrinos; 2020: CNO neutrinos).
- Italian Postal Service commemorative stamp honoring Borexino (2014).

== Selected publications ==
- Borexino Collaboration, “Neutrinos from the primary proton–proton fusion process in the Sun,” Nature 512 (2014) 383.
- Borexino Collaboration, “Experimental evidence of neutrinos produced in the CNO fusion cycle in the Sun,” Nature 587 (2020) 577.
- Borexino Collaboration, “Comprehensive measurement of pp-chain solar neutrinos,” Nature 562 (2018) 505.
- Borexino Collaboration, “Observation of geo-neutrinos,” Phys. Lett. B 687 (2010) 299.
- Borexino Collaboration, “Precision measurement of the 7Be solar neutrino interaction rate in Borexino,” Phys. Rev. Lett. 107 (2011) 141302.
- Borexino Collaboration, “First evidence of pep solar neutrinos by direct detection in Borex
- Borexino Collaboration, “First evidence of pep solar neutrinos by direct detection in Borexino,” Phys. Rev. Lett. 108 (2012) 051302.
- Borexino Collaboration, “Neutrinos from the primary proton–proton fusion process in the Sun,” Nature 512 (2014) 383.
- Borexino Collaboration, “Comprehensive measurement of pp-chain solar neutrinos,” Nature 562 (2018) 505.
- Borexino Collaboration, “Experimental evidence of neutrinos produced in the CNO fusion cycle in the Sun,” Nature 587 (2020) 577.
- P.L. Frabetti et al., “Measurement of the mass and lifetime of the X0,” Phys. Rev. Lett. 70 (1993) 1381.
- E687 Collaboration, “Measurement of the masses and widths of L=1 charmed mesons,” Phys. Rev. Lett. 72 (1994) 324.

== See also ==
- Borexino
- Gran Sasso National Laboratory
- Neutrino astronomy
- CNO cycle
- Geoneutrino
