= Rain Shower =

1952 short story by Hwang Sun-won

"Sonagi" (소나기), also known as "Rain Shower", is a short story written by Korean writer Hwang Sun-won in 1952. Like many of Hwang’s stories, it was written while he lived as a refugee with his family during the Korean War.

A sonagi is a brief, heavy rain shower that starts suddenly and ends quickly, typically on a hot summer afternoon. In the story, it symbolizes the short but heart-rending love between a boy and a girl.

Although many of Hwang’s short stories are notable, “Sonagi” is cited as his timeless Korean classic and continues to be one of the most-read short stories in Korean literature. Koreans of all ages are acquainted with this story, but its addition to the school curriculum has made it particularly popular among schoolchildren. It is famous for its poignant depiction of the Korean countryside and innocent adolescent love.

== Plot summary ==
The story begins when a young boy notices the great-granddaughter of Mr. Yoon sitting on a stepping stone in a stream, attempting to catch her reflection by scooping water into her hands. When she suddenly notices him watching, she throws a pebble at him before leaving. The boy keeps the pebble and takes it home.

The following day, the boy returns to the stream, but the girl is nowhere to be found. From then on, he develops the habit of rubbing the pebble she threw at him. One day, while sitting on the same stepping stone and trying to catch his own reflection in the water, he unexpectedly sees the girl's reflection. Embarrassed, he runs away but stumbles over the stones in the stream.

The two meet again on a Saturday when the girl shows the boy a silk clam (비단조개). Their friendship quickly grows, and they spend time exploring the countryside together. They play among the fields, interact with scarecrows, and chase a calf. After being scolded by the calf's owner, they are caught in a sudden downpour. They first take shelter in an abandoned lookout, but as the rain continues to fall, they move to a nearby haystack. When the storm finally passes, the boy carries the girl across a ditch on his back to keep her from getting wet.

In the days that follow, the boy repeatedly returns to the stream, hoping to see the girl again, but she does not appear. Eventually, she returns and explains that she has been ill ever since catching a cold during the rainstorm. She shows him the dress she wore that day, still stained by the water from the ditch. Before leaving, she gives him several dates taken from her family's ancestral memorial ceremony.

That evening, the boy secretly gathers walnuts from a nearby grove, intending to give them to the girl as a token of gratitude. However, while resting at home, he overhears his father telling his mother that the Yoon family's fortunes have declined and that the girl has passed away. His father remarks that she must have been an extraordinary child, as her final wish was to be buried in the same clothes she had worn on the day she spent with the boy in the rain.

== In other media ==
In 1979, “Sonagi” was adapted into a Korean feature film of the same name. The scene in which the boy and girl take shelter from the rain has since become a widely recognized motif and is frequently referenced in Korean romantic cinema. Notable works that allude to this narrative element include My Sassy Girl (2001), The Classic (2003), and an episode of the 2004 MBC drama Tropical Nights in December. The story was also adapted into an animated film in August 2017.

== Sonagi Village ==
In 2009, Sonagi Village and Hwang Soon Won Literary House were opened in Yangpyeong County at Sooneung-ri, Seojong-myeon.

== See also ==
- Korean literature
- Contemporary culture of South Korea
