= Yeom Sang-seop =

South Korean writer (1897–1963)

- Born: 30 August 1897
- Died: March 14, 1963 (aged 65)
- Writing career
- Language: Korean
- Notable work: Three Generations
- Notable awards: Seoul City Cultural Award, Asian Liberty Literature Prize, Academy of Arts Award, Samil Culture Award

Korean name
- Hangul: 염상섭
- Hanja: 廉想涉
- RR: Yeom Sangseop
- MR: Yŏm Sangsŏp

Art name
- Hangul: 횡보
- Hanja: 橫步
- RR: Hoengbo
- MR: Hoengbo

Yeom Sang-seop (Korean: 염상섭) (1897–1963) was a South Korean novelist and freedom fighter. He was an early pioneer of modern narrative in Korea and a "writer of the period of dissatisfaction". In this role, he was one of the first naturalistic and realistic writers in Korean literature. His role in the resistance to Japanese colonialism resulted in his arrest.

== Early life ==
Yeom was born in 1897 in Seoul and began his high school level studies in Japan in 1912. He graduated from Posung High School in 1915 and entered Keio University. After one semester, however, he dropped out and began a literary magazine with fellow writer Hwang Seok-u. At about this time, he became involved with the March 1st Movement and began to plan a rally in Osaka, Japan. For these efforts, he was arrested and put in prison but was subsequently acquitted on appeal.

== Career ==
In 1920, he returned to Korea and took a position as a reporter at the Dong-A Ilbo newspaper. He also joined a literary movement associated with a cultural magazine called The Ruins. During the 1920s, he became a proponent of a national literature for Korea and was one of the few writers who did not write in Japanese or publish fawning articles at the height of Japan's colonization. In 1928 he married Kim Yong-ok and joined the Chosun Ilbo as main editor of the Arts and Science section of that paper. During the 1930s, he also served in editorial positions at the Maeil Shinbo and the Mansun Ilbo.

Perhaps his most famous work is Three Generations, a 472-page novel which was published in 1931. As was common at the time, the novel was published in serial format, in the Chosun Ilbo. The novel was not initially recognized as important and was not published as a book until 1948. In Three Generations, he calmly depicts the Korean people living in the Colonial Era. The central figure of his observation in Three Generations is, so to speak, the lives of intellectuals and urban middle class families living in the 1930s.

In 1946, following World War II, he became the Editor-in-Chief of the Kyunghyang Shinmun. At the outbreak of the Korean War in 1950, he was appointed an officer in the Navy and served in a journalistic capacity at naval headquarters. He was appointed President of Seorabal College of Art in 1954 and, three years later, received an honorary degree in Public Administration from the Korea National Defense University.

He died of cancer on March 14, 1963, at the age of sixty-seven.

== Selected works ==
- Three Generations (삼대)
- Fig (무화과)
- Blow (취우)
- Tree Frog in the Specimen Room (표본실의 청개구리)
- Two Bankrupt (두 파산)
- Bending (절곡)
- The Ruins (얼룩진 시대 풍경)
- Out of the Blue (만세전)
- Dying (임종)

In English translation

- Three Generations
- On the Eve of the Uprising (in the collection On the Eve of the Uprising and Other Stories from Colonial Korea)

== Awards ==
- Seoul Cultural Prize (1954)
- Asia Freedom Literature Prize (1956)
- Korean Academy of the Arts Distinguished Service Award
- Samil Prize (1962)
