= Kōichirō Nishikawa =

Japanese elementary particle physicist (1949–2018)

- 西川 公一郎
- Born: 1949
- Died: November 28, 2018
- Education: Northwestern (Ph.D. 1980)
- Known for: neutrino physics
- Awards: Asahi Prize (1998); Nishina Memorial Prize (2005); Bruno Pontecorvo Prize (2016); Breakthrough Prize in Fundamental Physics (2016)
- Scientific career
- Fields: experimental particle physics
- Institutions: Kyōto University; KEK; J-PARC
- Doctoral advisor: David Buchholz

Kōichirō Nishikawa (Japanese: 西川 公一郎, born 1949 - November 28, 2018) was a Japanese elementary particle physicist, known for contributions to neutrino physics. He was professor emeritus of the KEK high-energy physics laboratory and Kyōto University.

Nishikawa graduated from Kyōto University in 1971 and completed his doctorate at Northwestern in 1980 working with David Buchholz. After working at the University of Chicago, State University of New York, and Tōkyō University, he combined positions at KEK and Kyōto University, eventually becoming director of the Institute for Particle and Nuclear physics at the KEK laboratory and deputy director of the J-PARC proton accelerator facility.

Nishikawa's most notable achievements were as founder and leader of the K2K and T2K experiments. K2K, which ran from 1999 until 2005, used the Super Kamiokande detector in Kamioka to measure a controlled beam of neutrinos emitted by the KEK proton synchrotron. The K2K team verified with greater accuracy the neutrino oscillations observed in atmospheric neutrinos by the Super Kamiokande experiment. The T2K experiment, which began in 2010 as a successor to K2K, used neutrino beams from the J-PARC proton accelerator with the Super Kamiokande detector to observe neutrino oscillations with specific start and end flavors, thereby measuring the parameters of this flavor-switching behavior.

In 2016, Nishikawa and the K2K and T2K groups received the Breakthrough Prize in Fundamental Physics together with other neutrino research collaborations. He was awarded the Nishina Memorial Prize in 2005, and the Bruno Pontecorvo Prize in 2016. He also received the 1998 Asahi Prize as part of the Super-Kamiokande experiment that discovered the mass of neutrinos.
