= Lincoln Wolfenstein =

American particle physicist (1923–2015)

- Born: 10 February 1923; Cleveland, Ohio, US
- Died: 27 March 2015 (aged 92); Oakland, California, US
- Education: University of Chicago
- Known for: Wolfenstein parametrization Mikheyev–Smirnov–Wolfenstein effect Weak Interaction
- Awards: Guggenheim Fellowship (1973); Sakurai Prize (1992); Bruno Pontecorvo Prize (2005)
- Scientific career
- Fields: Physics
- Workplaces: Carnegie Mellon University
- Thesis: (1949)

Lincoln Wolfenstein (February 10, 1923 – March 27, 2015) was an American particle physicist who studied the weak interaction. Wolfenstein was born in 1923 and obtained his PhD in 1949 from the University of Chicago. He retired from Carnegie Mellon University in 2000 after being a faculty member for 52 years. Despite being retired, he continued to come into work nearly every day.

Wolfenstein was a particle phenomenologist, a theorist who focused primarily on connecting theoretical physics to experimental observations. In 1978, he noted that the presence of electrons in Earth and Solar matter could affect neutrino propagation. This work led to an eventual understanding of the MSW effect, which acts to enhance neutrino oscillation in matter. Wolfenstein received the 2005 Bruno Pontecorvo Prize from The Scientific Council of the Joint Institute for Nuclear Research (JINR), for his pioneering work on the MSW effect.

He was elected to the National Academy of Sciences in 1978. He was a founding member of the original Pittsburgh SANE (Committee for a Sane Nuclear Policy) and a member of the Union of Concerned Scientists. In 1986, Wolfenstein was awarded the New Person Award by the Thomas Merton Center in Pittsburgh for his work in pursuit of nuclear disarmament: He led a lifetime of advocating for responsible science as well as for individual rights and liberties. In 1992, Wolfenstein was awarded the American Physical Society's J.J. Sakurai Prize for Theoretical Particle Physics for "his many contributions to the theory of weak interactions, particularly CP violation and the properties of neutrinos".

== See also ==
- Trimaximal mixing
