= Alfred K. Mann =

American physicist

Alfred K. Mann (September 4, 1920 – January 13, 2013) was an American particle physicist, known for his role in the discovery of fundamental properties of neutrinos.

== Education and career ==
Born in New York, Mann earned all three of his degrees from the University of Virginia: BA in philosophy in 1942, MS in physics in 1946, and PhD in physics in 1947. During WW II, he participated in the Manhattan Project.

After working for a time at Columbia University he moved to the University of Pennsylvania in 1949. where he worked on the fundamental properties of neutrinos. He was an Guggenheim Fellow for the academic year 1981–1982. From his obituary in The Philadelphia Inquirer:

In 2003, Dr. Mann helped organize a campaign against the proposed closure of an 8,000-foot-deep South Dakota gold mine that was seen as an ideal site to measure the subatomic particles called neutrinos. ... His efforts in advocating to keep the mine open were recognized by a proclamation from the governor of South Dakota, said Eugene Beier, a Penn physics professor who collaborated with Dr. Mann on numerous occasions. ... Dr. Mann joined the faculty at Penn in 1949 after a stint at Columbia University. He was perhaps best known for his discoveries of fundamental properties of neutrinos, which are essential to the process of fusion. "The stars could not burn without them," said Beier, who joined Dr. Mann on several of his findings. Neutrinos are emitted in countless numbers by the sun and other stars. The South Dakota mine was seen as a good place to detect them because the earth acts as a filter. Most cosmic radiation is blocked from reaching that deep into the Earth, whereas neutrinos can slip right through. During their careers, Dr. Mann and Beier helped make the first direct measurements of neutrinos emitted by the sun, and also measured the particles coming from a supernova, an experience Dr. Mann recounted in the 1987 book, Shadow of a Star.

== Selected publications ==
- Shadow of a star: the neutrino story of Supernova 1987A. NY: W. H. Freeman. 1997.
- For better or worse: the marriage of science and government in the United States. NY: Columbia U. Press. 2000. ISBN 9780231505666.
