= Glutaraldehyde =

Chemical compound (CH2)3(CHO)2

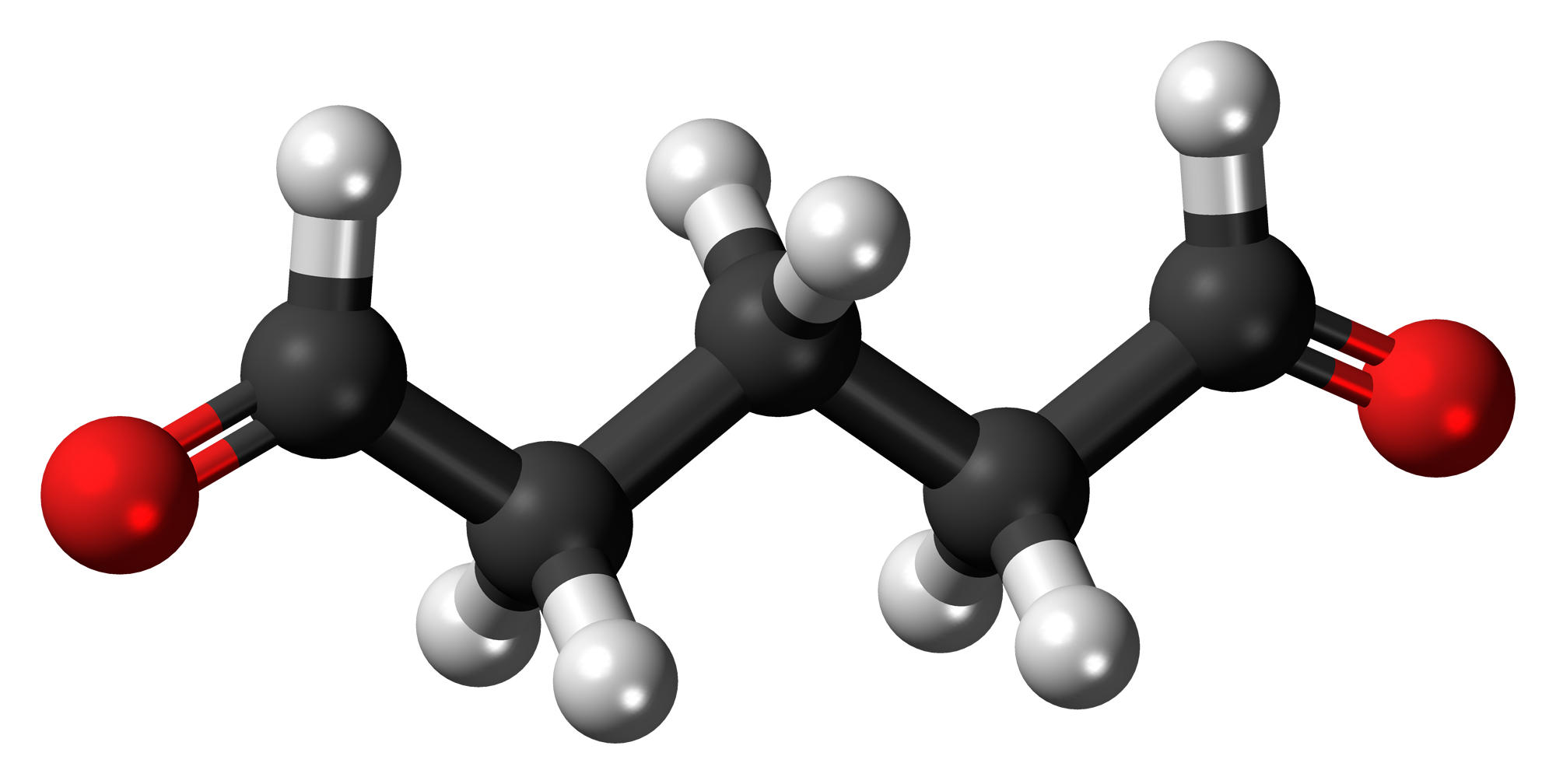

Names
- Preferred IUPAC name Pentanedial
- Other names Glutaraldehyde; Glutardialdehyde; Glutaric acid dialdehyde Glutaric aldehyde Glutaric dialdehyde 1,5-Pentanedial

Identifiers
CAS Number	111-30-8
3D model (JSmol)	Interactive image
ChemSpider	3365
DrugBank	DB03266
ECHA InfoCard	100.003.506
KEGG	D01120
PubChem CID	3485
UNII	T3C89M417N
CompTox Dashboard (EPA)	DTXSID6025355
- InChI: InChI=1S/C5H8O2/c6-4-2-1-3-5-7/h4-5H,1-3H2 Key: SXRSQZLOMIGNAQ-UHFFFAOYSA-N; InChI=1/C5H8O2/c6-4-2-1-3-5-7/h4-5H,1-3H2 Key: SXRSQZLOMIGNAQ-UHFFFAOYAO
- SMILES: O=CCCCC=O

Properties
Chemical formula	C_{5}H_{8}O_{2}
Molar mass	100.117 g·mol^{−1}
Appearance	Clear liquid
Odor	pungent
Density	1.06 g/mL
Melting point	−14 °C (7 °F; 259 K)
Boiling point	187 °C (369 °F; 460 K)
Solubility in water	Miscible, reacts
Vapor pressure	17 mmHg (20°C)

Hazards
- GHS labelling
Pictograms	(GHS05: Corrosive) (GHS06: Toxic) (GHS08: Health hazard) (GHS09: Environmental hazard)
Signal word	Danger
Hazard statements	H302, H314, H317, H331, H334, H400
Precautionary statements	P260, P264, P270, P271, P272, P273, P280, P284, P301+P312, P302+P352, P304+P340, P305+P351+P338, P311, P330, P332+P313, P403+P233, P405, P501
NFPA 704 (fire diamond)	2 2 0
Flash point	noncombustible
Threshold limit value (TLV)	0.2 ppm (0.82 mg/m^{3}) (TWA), 0.05 ppm (STEL)
- Lethal dose or concentration (LD, LC)
LD_{50} (median dose)	134 mg/kg (rat, oral); 2,560 mg/kg (rabbit, dermal)
- NIOSH (US health exposure limits)
REL (Recommended)	0.2 ppm (0.8 mg/m^{3})
- Except where otherwise noted, data are given for materials in their standard state (at 25 °C [77 °F], 100 kPa). verify (what is ?) Infobox references

Glutaraldehyde is an organic compound with the formula (CH_{2})_{3}(CHO)_{2}. The molecule consists of a five carbon chain doubly terminated with formyl (CHO) groups. It is usually used as a solution in water, and such solutions exists as a collection of hydrates, cyclic derivatives, and condensation products, several of which interconvert. Because the molecule has two aldehyde functional groups, glutaraldehyde (and its hydrates) can crosslink substances with primary amine groups, through condensation. Crosslinking can rigidify and deactivate proteins and other molecules that are critical for normal biological function, such as DNA, and so glutaraldehyde solutions are effective biocides and fixatives. It is sold under the brandnames Cidex and Glutaral. As a disinfectant, it is used to sterilize surgical instruments.

== Uses ==
=== Biochemistry ===
Glutaraldehyde is used in biochemistry applications as an amine-reactive homobifunctional crosslinker and fixative. It kills cells quickly by crosslinking their proteins. It is usually employed alone or mixed with formaldehyde as the first of two fixative processes to stabilize specimens such as bacteria, plant material, and human cells. A second fixative procedure uses osmium tetroxide to crosslink and stabilize cell and organelle membrane lipids.

Another application for treatment of proteins with glutaraldehyde is the inactivation of bacterial toxins to generate toxoid vaccines, e.g., the pertussis (whooping cough) toxoid component in Tdap vaccines.

=== Material science ===
In material science glutaraldehyde application areas range from polymers to metals and biomaterials. Glutaraldehyde is commonly used as fixing agent before characterization of biomaterials for microscopy. Glutaraldehyde is a powerful crosslinking agent for many polymers containing primary amine groups. Glutaraldehyde can be used for an interlinking agent to improve the adhesion force between two polymeric coatings. Glutaraldehyde is used to protect against corrosion of undersea pipes.

=== Medical ===
==== Clinical uses ====
Glutaraldehyde is used as a disinfectant and medication. Usually applied as a solution, it is used to sterilize surgical instruments and other areas.

==== Dermatological uses ====
As a medication it is used to treat plantar warts. For this purpose, a 10% w/v solution is used. It dries the skin, facilitating physical removal of the wart.

Glutaraldehyde is also used in the treatment of hyperhidrosis under the control of dermatologists in people who have frequent sweating but do not respond to aluminum chloride. Glutaraldehyde solution is an effective agent to treat palmar and plantar hyperhidrosis as an alternative to tannic acid and formaldehyde.

=== Other uses ===
==== Aquaria ====
Glutaraldehyde diluted with water is often marketed as alternative to carbon dioxide gas injection for aquarium plants, but it lacks any characteristics that promote the growth of aquatic plants, and does not raise the CO_{2} concentration of water it is added to. Aquarists also commonly use it in low concentrations as an algicide.

== Production and reactions ==
=== Production ===
Glutaraldehyde is produced industrially by the catalytic oxidation of cyclopentene by hydrogen peroxide, which can be achieved in the presence of various tungstic acid-based heteropoly acid catalysts. This reaction essentially mimics ozonolysis. Alternatively it can be made by the Diels-Alder reaction of acrolein and vinyl ethers followed by hydrolysis.

=== Reactions ===
Like other dialdehydes, (e.g., glyoxal) and simple aldehydes (e.g., formaldehyde), glutaraldehyde hydrates in aqueous solution, forming gem-diols. These diols in turn equilibrate with cyclic hemiacetal. Monomeric glutaraldehyde polymerizes by aldol condensation and Michael reactions yielding alpha, beta-unsaturated poly-glutaraldehyde and related oligomers. This reaction occurs at alkaline pH values.

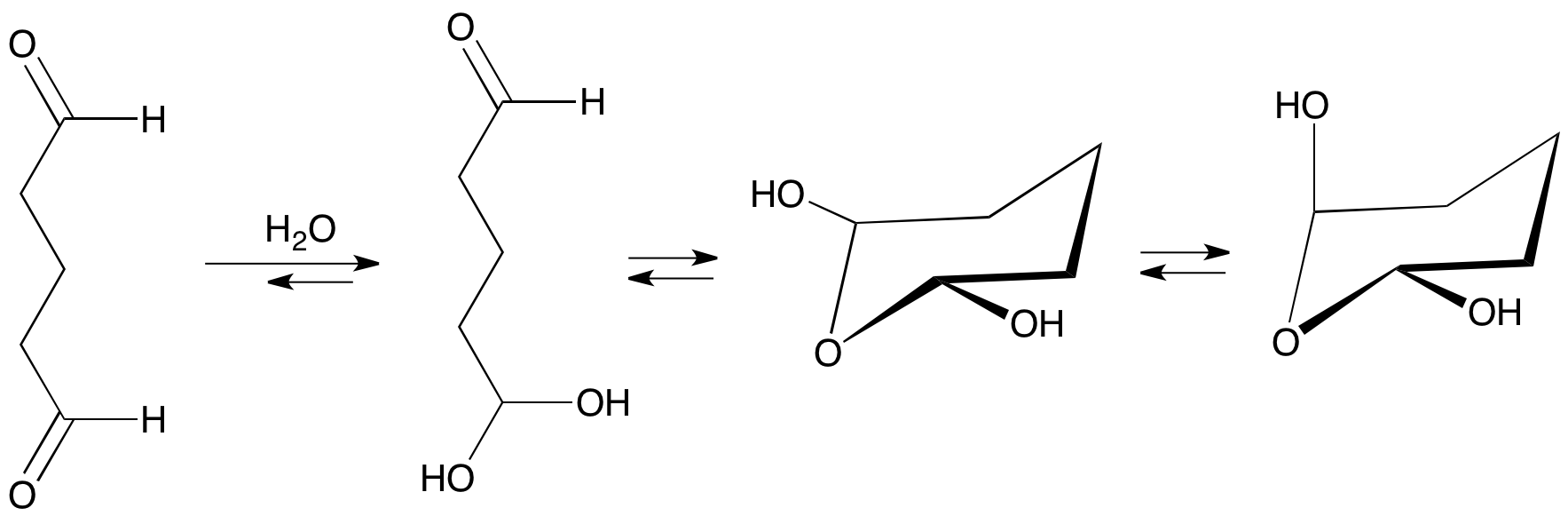

A number of mechanisms have been invoked to explain the biocidal and fixative properties of glutaraldehyde. Like many other aldehydes, it reacts with primary amines and thiol groups, which are common functional groups in proteins, nucleic acids and polymeric materials. Being bi-functional, glutaraldehyde is a crosslinker, which rigidifies macromolecular structures and shuts down their reactivity.

Imine formation from primary amines and the carbonyls of glutaraldehyde is the basis of its fixative and biocidal properties.

The aldehyde groups in glutaraldehyde are susceptible to formation of imines by reaction with the amines of lysine and nucleic acids. The derivatives from aldol condensation of pairs of glutaraldehyde also undergo imine formation.

== Safety ==
Side effects include skin irritation. If exposed to large amounts, nausea, headache, and shortness of breath may occur. Protective equipment is recommended when used, especially in high concentrations. Glutaraldehyde is effective against a range of microorganisms including spores. Glutaraldehyde is a dialdehyde. It works by a number of mechanisms.

As a strong sterilant, glutaraldehyde is toxic and a strong irritant. There is no strong evidence of carcinogenic activity, However, some occupations that work with this chemical have an increased risk of some cancers.
