= OxFA process =

The OxFA process is a process to produce formic acid from biomass by catalytic oxidation using molecular oxygen or air. Polyoxometalates of the Keggin-type are used as catalysts.

== OxFA-Process ==
=== General description ===
Formic acid is obtained by aqueous catalytic partial oxidation of wet biomass. A Keggin-type polyoxometalate (H_{5}PV_{2}Mo_{10}O_{40}) is used as the homogeneous catalyst to convert sugars, wood, waste paper or cyanobacteria to formic acid and CO_{2} as the sole byproduct. Yields of up to 53% formic acid can be achieved.

It is possible to convert water-insoluble biomass in a suspension with the catalyst. After the reaction, formic acid is separated from the reaction mixture. Depending on the separation process, the formic acid can be further purified or used as it is. The remaining solution of the catalyst, residual formic acid and additives are recycled to the reaction. In this step, solids (e.g. soil from dirty biomass) or unreactive inorganics (e.g. inorganic salts from the natural salt content of the biomass) may be separated from the catalyst solution.

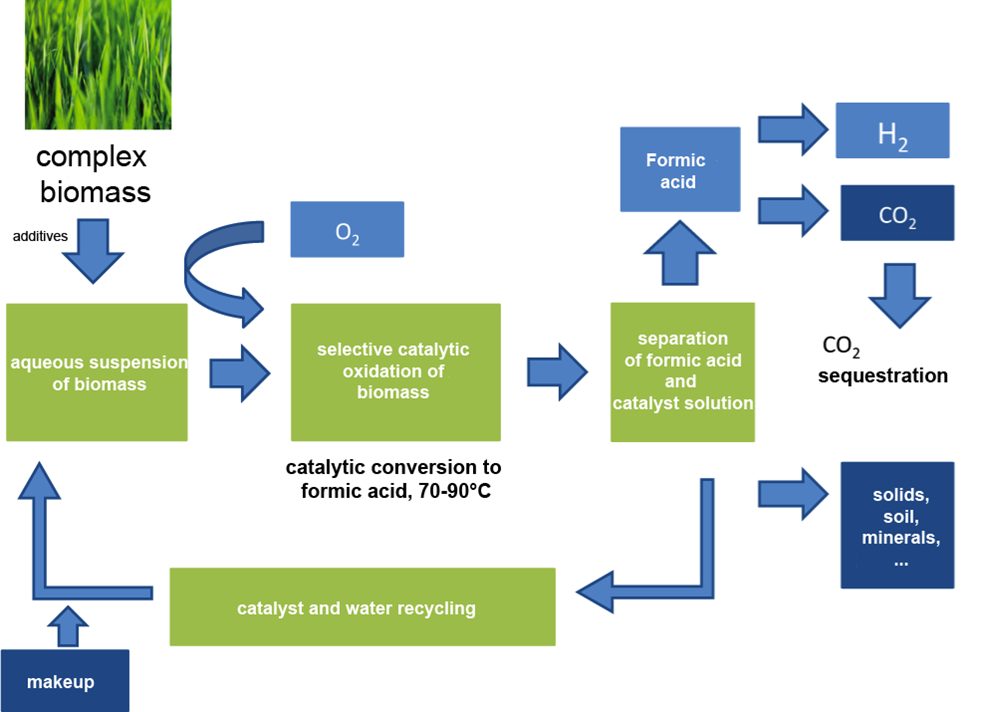
Block scheme of the OxFA-process

The general reaction for a simple sugar like glucose can be summarized as follows:

C_{6}H_{12}O_{6} + wO_{2} → xHCOOH + yCO_{2} + zH_{2}O

=== Biomass pretreatment ===
Water-insoluble biomass must be shredded to an appropriate size to enhance the surface area at which the reaction takes place. Water-soluble biomass needs no special pretreatment.

=== Biomass oxidation ===
The reaction is carried out at 363 K and 30 bar oxygen partial pressure, either as pure oxygen or air. Since hot formic acid is corrosive, suitable autoclaves (e.g. Hastelloy) must be used. Reaction times depend on the reactivity of the feed. For example, microcrystalline cellulose is converted to 15 and 22% after 24 h and 66 h, respectively, whereas the more reactive xylan is converted to 88% and 94% respectively. The use of additives more than doubles the reaction rates, especially for the refractory compound cellulose. If p-toluenesulfonic acid is used as the additive, conversion of cellulose rises from 22% to 68% after 66 h. Under the reaction conditions, overoxidation of the produced formic acid does not occur. In another recent example, formic acid was produced from biomass-derived sugars using hydrogen peroxide as the oxidant over heterogeneous catalysts.

=== Product separation ===
Formic acid can be separated from the reaction mixture by means of distillation or extraction.

Distillation of the reaction mixture yields a condensate that is high in water content, since water and formic acid form a high boiling azeotrope. Formic acid is concentrated in the still bottom. If all the volatile compound are distilled, the concentration of the received formic acid is that of the original reaction mixture.

Extraction of formic acid can be effected with several solvents.

Extracting agent	Partition coefficient	Distribution of catalyst
Dibutyl ether	0.59	Aqueous phase
Methylisobutylketone	0.88	Aqueous+Organic phase
Ethyl acetate	1.07	Aqueous+Organic phase
Dibutylformamide	0.98	Organic phase

The solvents listed in the table were found to be stable against oxidation by the catalyst. Only the solvent dibutyl ether leaves the catalyst in the aqueous phase, whereas with dibutylformamide the catalyst is completely extracted into the organic phase.

=== Catalyst recycling and purification ===
After most or all of the formic acid is separated from the reaction mixture, the remaining solution contains water, the catalyst, additives and residual formic acid. This solution can be directly recycled to the reaction without loss of performance.

=== Potential uses of biobased formic acid ===
Formic acid has been considered as a material for hydrogen storage. This process would allow to use bio-based instead of fossil-based formic acid.
