= Silicotungstic acid =

Chemical compound

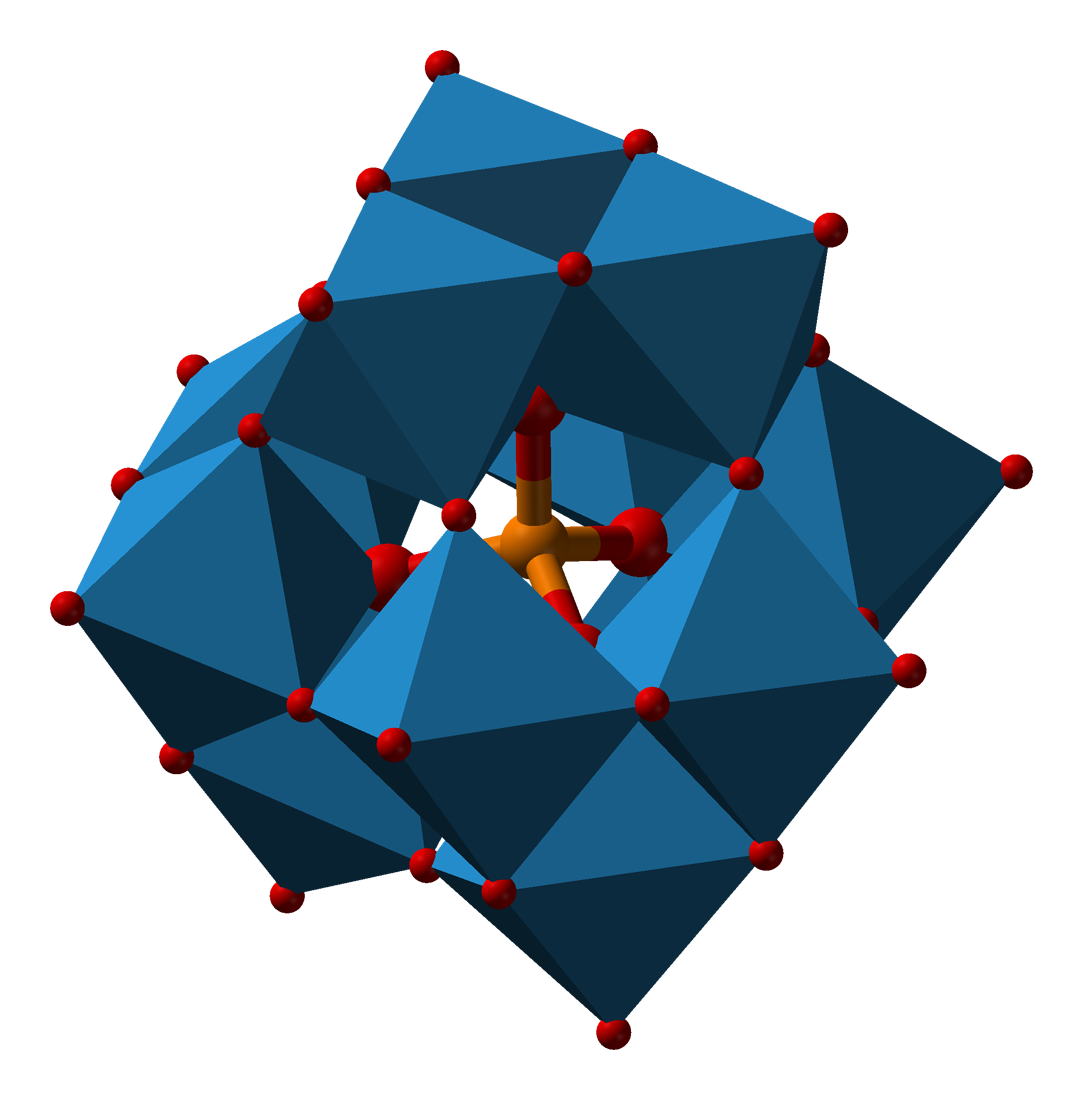

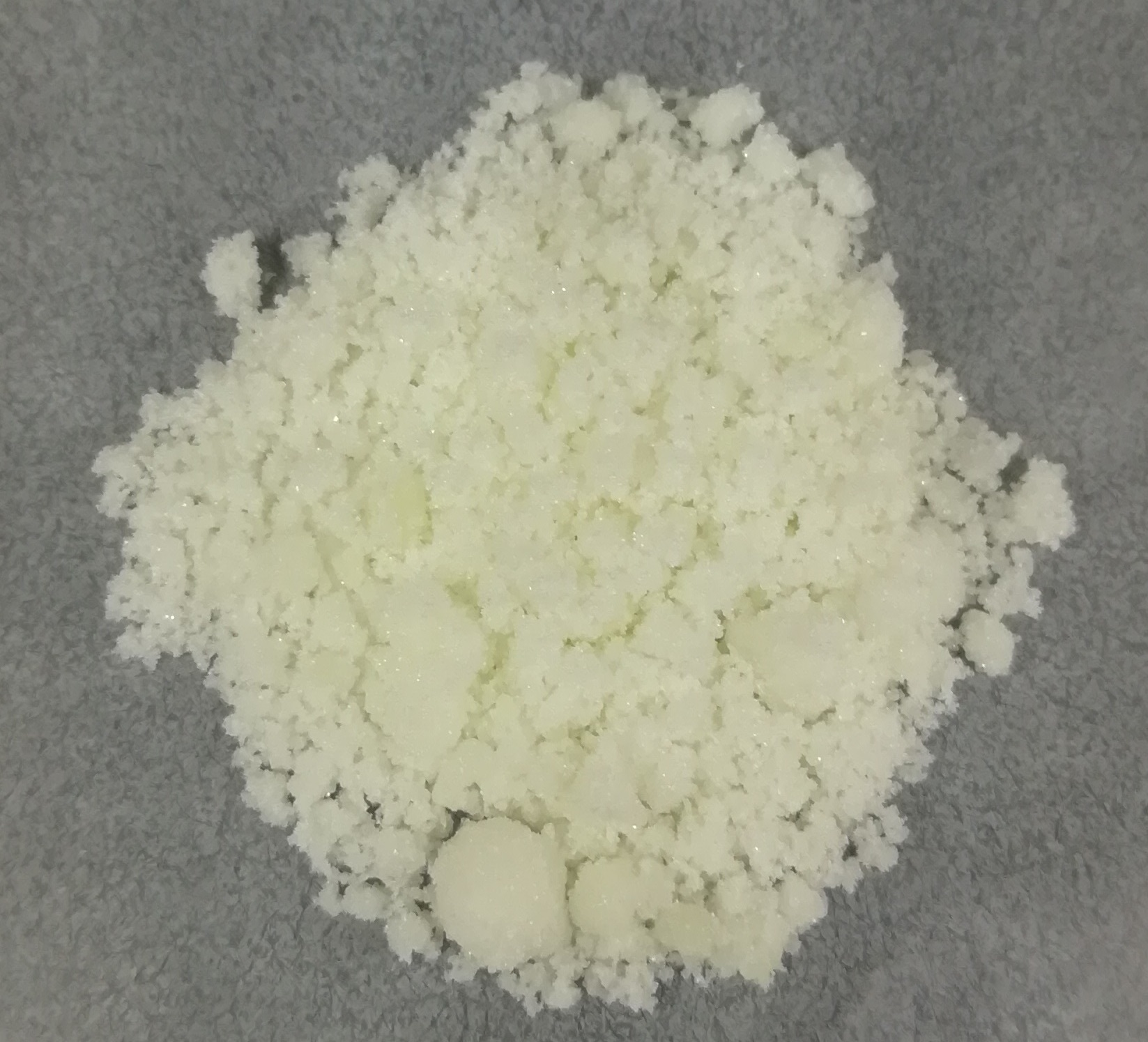

Names
- Other names Tungstosilicic acid

Identifiers
| CAS Number | (anhydrous): 12027-38-2; (hydrate): 12027-43-9 |
| 3D model (JSmol) | (anhydrous): Interactive image |
| ChemSpider | (anhydrous): 21241680; (hydrate): 30782693 |
| ECHA InfoCard | 100.206.333 |
| PubChem CID | (anhydrous): 90478850; (hydrate): 71307034 |
| UNII | (anhydrous): HC56ET3NXY; (hydrate): 26XKI06R59 |
| CompTox Dashboard (EPA) | (anhydrous): DTXSID50923295 |
- InChI: InChI=1S/H4O4Si.36O.12W/c1-5(2,3)4;;;;;;;;;;;;;;;;;;;;;;;;;;;;;;;;;;;;;;;;;;;;;;;;/h1-4H;;;;;;;;;;;;;;;;;;;;;;;;;;;;;;;;;;;;;;;;;;;;;;;; Key: CGFYHILWFSGVJS-UHFFFAOYSA-N; (hydrate): InChI=1S/H4O4Si.H2O.36O.12W/c1-5(2,3)4;;;;;;;;;;;;;;;;;;;;;;;;;;;;;;;;;;;;;;;;;;;;;;;;;/h1-4H;1H2;;;;;;;;;;;;;;;;;;;;;;;;;;;;;;;;;;;;;;;;;;;;;;;; Key: ACTPFSYIGLFGLY-UHFFFAOYSA-N
- SMILES: (anhydrous): [W]18%21%24(O[W]%16%18%23(O[W]56(O1)(O[W]247(O[W]9%22(O[W]%12%13(O2)(O[W]3%11%14(O[W]%17%19(O[W](O3)(O4)(O5)([O++]67[Si]%15%20[O++]89[W]%10(O[W](O[W](O%10)(O%11)(O%12)([O++]%13%14%15)[O-])(O%16)(O%17)([O++]%18%19%20)[O-])(O%21)(O%22)[O-])O)(O%23)[O-])[O-])[O-])(O%24)O)[O-])O)[O-])O

Properties
| Chemical formula | H_{4}[SiW_{12}O_{40}] |
| Molar mass | 2878.2 g/mol |
| Appearance | White solid |
| Melting point | 53 °C (127 °F; 326 K) |

Structure
| Dipole moment | 0 D |

Hazards
- GHS labelling
| Pictograms | (GHS05: Corrosive) (GHS07: Exclamation mark) |
| Signal word | Danger |
| Hazard statements | H314, H315, H319, H335, H412 |
| Precautionary statements | P260, P264, P271, P273, P280, P301+P330+P331, P302+P352, P303+P361+P353, P304+P340, P305+P351+P338, P310, P312, P321, P332+P313, P337+P313, P362, P363, P403+P233, P405, P501 |
| Flash point | Non-flammable |

Related compounds
| Related heteropoly acids | Phosphotungstic acid |
| Related compounds | Tungsten trioxide Tungstic acid |
- Except where otherwise noted, data are given for materials in their standard state (at 25 °C [77 °F], 100 kPa). verify (what is ?) Infobox references

Silicotungstic acid or tungstosilicic acid is a heteropoly acid with the chemical formula H_{4}[SiW_{12}O_{40}]. It forms hydrates H_{4}[SiW_{12}O_{40}]·nH_{2}O. In freshly prepared samples, n is approximately 29, but after prolonged desiccation, n becomes 6. It is a white solid although impure samples appear yellow. It is used as a catalyst in the chemical industry.

== Applications ==
Silicotungstic acid is used to manufacture ethyl acetate by the alkylation of acetic acid by ethylene:

C_{2}H_{4} + CH_{3}CO_{2}H → CH_{3}CO_{2}C_{2}H_{5}

It's also been commercialized for the oxidation of ethylene to acetic acid:

C_{2}H_{4} + O_{2} → CH_{3}CO_{2}H

This route is claimed as a "greener" than methanol carbonylation. The heteropoly acid is dispersed on silica gel at 20-30 wt% to maximize catalytic ability.

It was recently proposed as a mediator in production of hydrogen through electrolysis of water by a process that would reduce the danger of explosion while allowing efficient hydrogen production at low current densities, conducive to hydrogen production using renewable energy.

== Synthesis and structure ==
The free acid is produced by combining sodium silicate and tungsten trioxide followed by the treatment of the mixture with hydrochloric acid. The polyoxo cluster adopts a Keggin structure, with T_{d} point group symmetry.

== Hazards ==
Silicotungstic acid is an irritating and odorless substance.
