= Dawson structure =

Structural motif for heteropoly acids

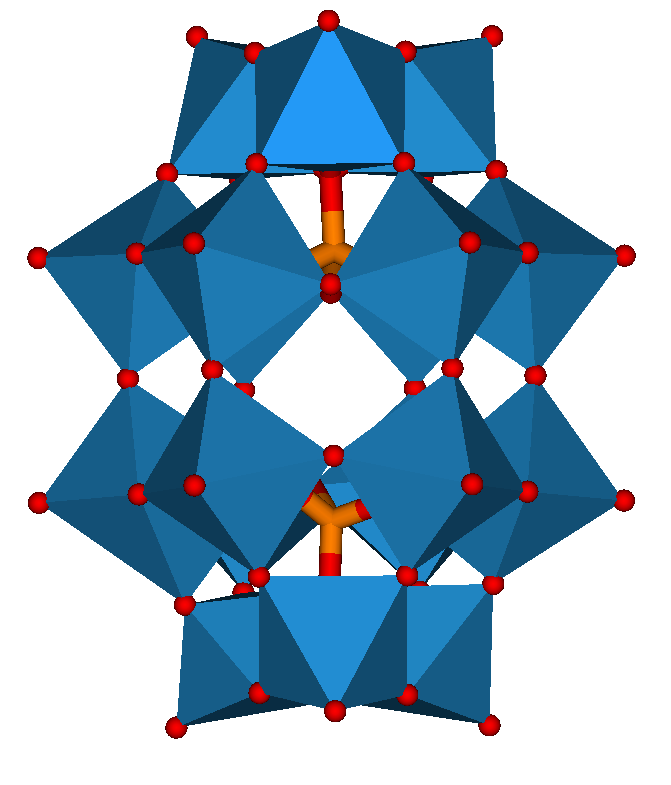
Dawson structure

The Dawson structure is a well-known structural motif for heteropoly acids. The Dawson structure can be viewed as the fusion of two defect Keggin structure, fragments with three missing octahedra. As in Keggin structures, the Dawson structure has an oxyanion at its core. Unlike Keggin structures, there are two such anions, one at each side of the ellipsoidal anion. An example is [S_{2}W_{18}O_{62}]^{4−}, which can also be described as [(SO_{4})_{2}(WO_{3})_{18}]^{4−}.

Commonly, Dawson structures feature phosphate as the central oxyanions. When the Keggin anion [PW_{12}O_{40}]^{3−} is allowed to stand in aqueous solution, it converts to [P_{2}W_{18}O_{62}]^{6−}.
