= Polyoxometalate =

Polyatomic ion

Polyoxometalates (POMs) are a class of inorganic compounds containing only transition metal(s) (M) and oxide (O^{2−}) with general moleclur formula [M_{m}O_{o}]^{k−} with m ≥ 3, o ≥ 9, k > 0. This article focuses on the isopolyoxometalates, where only one metallic element is involved. The heteropolyoxometalates are very similar but contain more than one metal cation.

== Formation ==
The oxides of d^{0} metals such as V_{2}O_{5}, MoO_{3}, WO_{3} dissolve at high pH to give orthometalates, VO_{4}^{3−}, MoO_{4}^{2−}, WO_{4}^{2−}. For Nb_{2}O_{5} and Ta_{2}O_{5}. The nature of the dissolved species at high pH is less defined, but these oxides also form polyoxometalates.

As the pH is lowered, solutions of orthometalates give oxide–hydroxide compounds such as WO_{3}(OH)^{−} and VO_{3}(OH)^{2−}, these species condense via the process of olation. The replacement of terminal M=O bonds, which have triple bond character, is compensated by the increase in coordination number. The nonobservation of polyoxochromate cages is rationalized by the small radius of Cr(VI), which may not accommodate octahedral coordination geometry.

Polycondensation of the MO_{3}(OH)^{n−} species entails loss of water and the formation of M−O−M linkages. The stoichiometry for hexamolybdate is shown:

6 MoO_{4}^{2−} + 10 HCl → Mo_{6}O_{19}^{2−} + 10 Cl^{−} + 5 H_{2}O

An abbreviated condensation sequence illustrated with vanadates is:

4 VO_{4}^{3−} + 8 H^{+} → V_{4}O_{12}^{4−} + 4 H_{2}O
5 V_{4}O_{12}^{4−} + 12 H^{+} → 2 [V_{10}O_{26}(OH)_{2}]^{4−} + 4 H_{2}O

When such acidifications are conducted in the presence of phosphate or silicate, heteropolymetalate can result. For example, the phosphotungstate anion PW_{12}O_{40}^{3−} consists of a framework of twelve octahedral tungsten oxyanions surrounding a central phosphate group.

== History ==
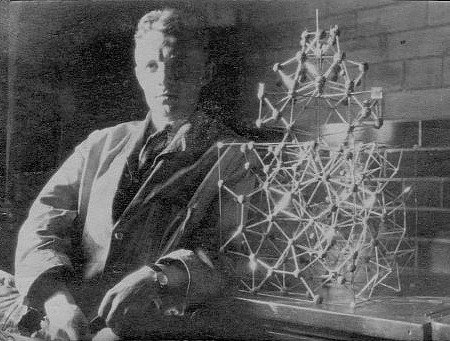
Dr. James F. Keggin, the discoverer of the Keggin structure

Ammonium phosphomolybdate, PMo_{12}O_{40}^{3−} anion, was reported in 1826. The isostructural phosphotungstate anion was characterized by X-ray crystallography 1934. This structure is called the Keggin structure after its discoverer.

The 1970s witnessed the introduction of quaternary ammonium salts of POMs. This innovation enabled systematic study without the complications of hydrolysis and acid/base reactions. The introduction of ^{17}O NMR spectroscopy allowed the structural characterization of POMs in solution.

The first example of a mineral with a polyoxometalate cation, ramazzoite, was described in 2016 in Ramazzo Mine, Liguria, Italy.

== Structure and bonding ==
The typical framework building blocks are polyhedral units, with 6-coordinate metal centers. Usually, these units share edges and/or vertices. The coordination number of the oxide ligands varies according to their location in the cage. Surface oxides tend to be terminal or doubly bridging oxo ligands. Interior oxides are typically triply bridging or even octahedral. POMs are sometimes viewed as soluble fragments of metal oxides.

Recurring structural motifs allow POMs to be classified. Iso-polyoxometalates (isopolyanions) feature octahedral metal centers. The heteropolymetalates form distinct structures because the main group center is usually tetrahedral. The Lindqvist and Keggin structures are common motifs for iso- and heteropolyanions, respectively.

Polyoxometalates typically exhibit coordinate metal-oxo bonds of different multiplicity and strength. In a typical POM such as the Keggin structure PW_{12}O_{40}^{3−}, each addenda center connects to single terminal oxo ligand, four bridging μ_{2}-O ligands and one bridging μ_{3}-O deriving from the central heterogroup. Metal–metal bonds in polyoxometalates are normally absent and owing to this property, F. Albert Cotton opposed to consider polyoxometalates as a form of cluster materials. However, metal-metal bonds are not completely absent in polyoxometalates and they are often present among the highly reduced species.

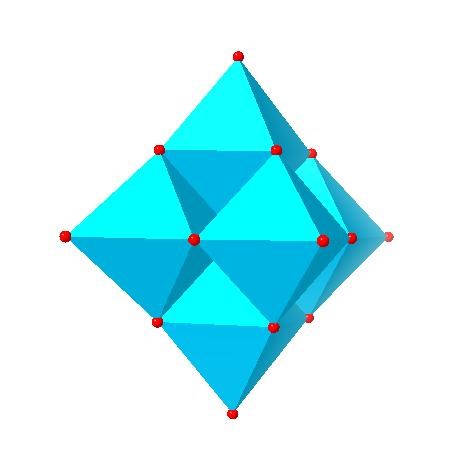
Lindqvist hexamolybdate, Mo_{6}O_{19}^{2−}

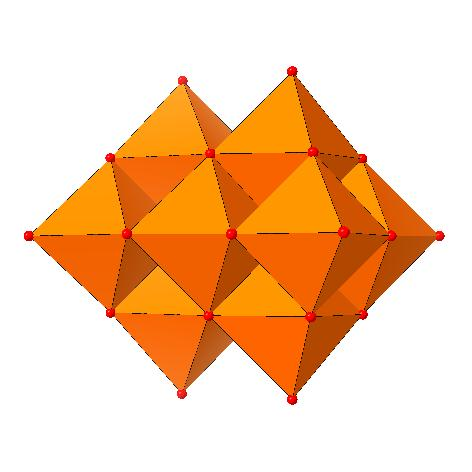
Decavanadate, V_{10}O_{28}^{6−}

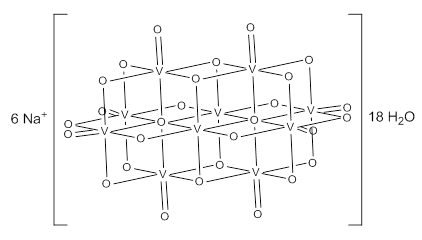
Line drawing of disodium decavanadate, V_{10}O_{28}^{6−}

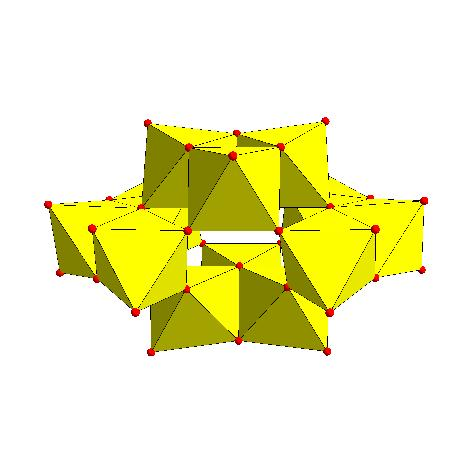
Paratungstate B, also called dihydrogen paratungstate, H_{2}W_{12}O_{42}^{10−}

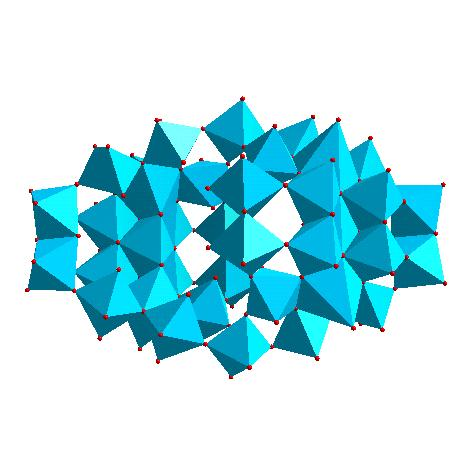
Mo_{36}-polymolybdate, [Mo_{36}O_{112}(H_{2}O)_{16}]^{8−}

=== Polymolybdates and tungstates ===
The polymolybdates and polytungstates are derived, formally at least, from the dianionic MO_{4}^{2−} precursors. The most common units for polymolybdates and polyoxotungstates are the octahedral {MO_{6}} centers, sometimes slightly distorted. Some polymolybdates contain pentagonal bipyramidal units. These building blocks are found in the molybdenum blues, which are mixed valence compounds.

=== Polyoxotechnetates and rhenates ===
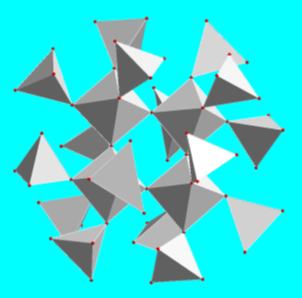
The structure of the polyanion Tc_{20}O_{68}^{4−}

Polyoxotechnetates form only in strongly acidic conditions, such as in HTcO_{4} or trifluoromethanesulfonic acid solutions. The first empirically isolated polyoxotechnetate was the red Tc_{20}O_{68}^{4−}. It contains both Tc(V) and Tc(VII) in ratio 4: 16 and is obtained as the hydronium salt (H_{7}O_{3})_{4}Tc_{20}O_{68}·4H_{2}O by concentrating an HTcO_{4} solution. Corresponding ammonium polyoxotechnetate salt was recently isolated from trifluoromethanesulfonic acid and it has very similar structure. The only polyoxorhenate formed in acidic conditions in presence of pyrazolium cation. The first empirically isolated polyoxorhenate was the white Re_{4}O_{15}^{2−}. It contains Re(VII) in both octahedral and tetrahedral coordination.

Mixed polyoxo(technetate-rhenate) [Tc_{4}O_{4}(H_{2}O)_{2}(ReO_{4})_{14}]^{2−} polyanion crystals that contain Tc(V) and Re(VII)were also isolated and structurally characterized.

=== Polyoxotantalates, niobates, and vanadates ===
The polyniobates, polytantalates, and vanadates are derived, formally at least, from highly charged MO_{4}^{3−} precursors. For Nb and Ta, most common members are M_{6}O_{19}^{8−} (M = Nb, Ta), which adopt the Lindqvist structure. These octaanions form in strongly basic conditions from alkali melts of the extended metal oxides (M_{2}O_{5}), or in the case of Nb even from mixtures of niobic acid and alkali metal hydroxides in aqueous solution. The hexatantalate can also be prepared by condensation of peroxotantalate [Ta(O_{2})_{4}]^{3−} in alkaline media. These polyoxometalates display an anomalous aqueous solubility trend of their alkali metal salts inasmuch as their Cs^{+} and Rb^{+} salts are more soluble than their Na^{+} and Li^{+} salts. The opposite trend is observed in group 6 POMs.

The decametalates with the formula M_{10}O_{28}^{6−} (M = Nb, Ta) are isostructural with decavanadate. They are formed exclusively by edge-sharing {MO_{6}} octahedra (the structure of decatungstate W_{10}O_{32}^{4−} comprises edge-sharing and corner-sharing tungstate octahedra).

=== Heteroatoms ===
Heteroatoms aside from the transition metal are a defining feature of heteropolymetalates. Many different elements can serve as heteroatoms but most common are PO_{4}^{3−}, SiO_{4}^{4−}, and AsO_{4}^{3−}.

=== Giant structures ===
Two views of a [Mo_{154}(NO)_{14}O_{n}]^{z−} cluster, omitting water and counter ions. Also shown is the X-ray powder pattern for the salt.

Polyoxomolybdates include the wheel-shaped molybdenum blue anions and spherical "keplerates". The cluster [Mo_{154}O_{420}(NO)_{14}(OH)_{28}(H_{2}O)_{70}]^{20−} consists of more than 700 atoms. The anion is in the form of a tire (the cavity has a diameter of more than 20 Å) and a large inner and outer surface.

=== Oxoalkoxometalates ===
Oxoalkoxometalates are clusters that contain both oxide and alkoxide ligands. Typically they lack terminal oxo ligands. Examples include the dodecatitanate Ti_{12}O_{16}(OPr^{i})_{16}, the iron oxoalkoxometalates and iron and copper Keggin ions.

=== Sulfido, imido, and other O-replaced oxometalates ===
The terminal oxide centers of polyoxometalate framework can in certain cases be replaced with other ligands, such as S^{2−}, Br^{−}, and NR^{2−}. Sulfur-substituted POMs are called polyoxothiometalates. Other ligands replacing the oxide ions have also been demonstrated, such as nitrosyl and alkoxy groups.

Polyfluoroxometalate are yet another class of O-replaced oxometalates.

=== Other ===
Numerous hybrid organic–inorganic materials that contain POM cores.

Illustrative of the diverse structures of POM is the ion CeMo_{12}O_{42}^{8−}, which has face-shared octahedra with Mo atoms at the vertices of an icosahedron.

== Uses ==
POMs are employed as commercial catalysts for oxidation of organic compounds.

== Research ==
Lanthanides can behave like Lewis acids and perform catalytic properties. Lanthanide-containing polyoxometalates show chemoselectivity and are also able to form inorganic–organic adducts, which can be exploited in chiral recognition.

POM-based aerobic oxidations have been promoted as alternatives to chlorine-based wood pulp bleaching processes, a method of decontaminating water, and a method to catalytically produce formic acid from biomass (OxFA process). Polyoxometalates have been shown to catalyse water splitting.

=== Molecular electronics ===
Some POMs exhibit unusual magnetic properties, which has prompted visions of many applications. One example is storage devices called qubits. non-volatile (permanent) storage components, also known as flash memory devices.

=== Drugs ===
Certain POMs have been considered as possible drugs and antiviral drugs, as well as antibacterial and antiviral uses.

== See also ==
- Heteropolyoxometalate
- Superatom
- Perovskite
- Metal aromaticity
