= Heteropolyoxometalate =

Ion with many transition metals

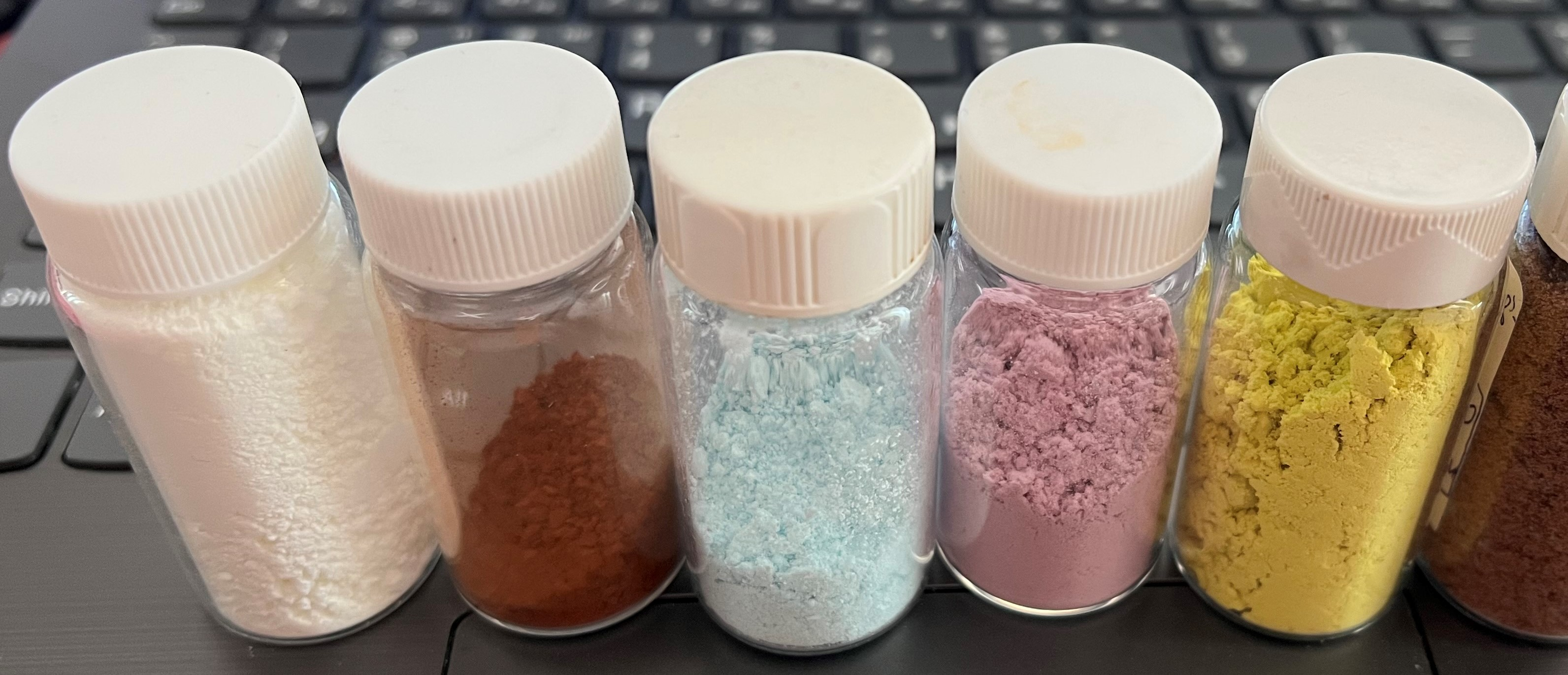
Heteropolymetalates: K_{5}[IMo_{6}O_{24}]·nH_{2}O Ag_{7}[PV_{12}O_{36}]·nH_{2}O (NH_{4})_{4}[NiMo_{6}O_{24}H_{6}]·5H_{2}O K_{3}[CrMo_{6}O_{24}H_{6}]·nH_{2}O (NH_{4})_{8}[CeMo_{12}O_{42}]·8H_{2}O

The heteropolyoxometalates consist of two or more transition metal oxyanions, linked together by shared oxygen atoms, forming a (more or less) closed three-dimensional molecular framework. Their general molecular formula is [X_{x}M_{m}O_{o}]^{k−} with x ≥ 1, m ≥ 3, o ≥ 9, k > 0 and X ≠ M (e.g., S, P, Si, etc.).

In contrast to isopolyoxometalates, which contain transition metal and oxygen only, the heteropolyoxometalates contain additional main group oxyanions like phosphate and silicate. The metal atoms are usually group 6 (Mo, W) or less commonly group 5 (V, Nb, Ta) transition metals in their highest oxidation states. They are usually colorless to orange, diamagnetic anions. For most heteropoly(oxo)metalates the W, Mo, or V, is complemented by main group oxyanions phosphate and silicate. Many exceptions to these general statements exist, and the class of compounds includes hundreds of examples.

== Structure ==
Certain structural motifs recur. The Keggin ion for example is common to both molybdates and tungstates with diverse central heteroatoms. The Keggin and Dawson structures have tetrahedrally-coordinated heteroatoms, such as P or Si, and the Anderson structure has an octahedral central atom, such as aluminium.

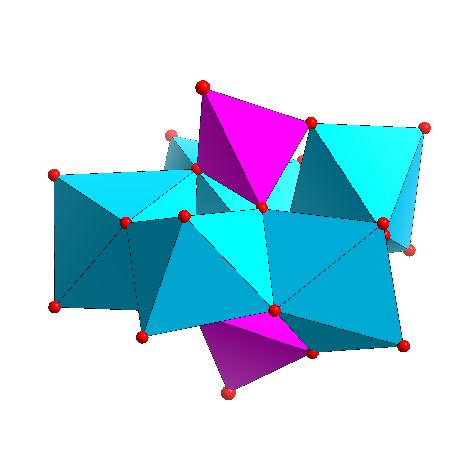
Strandberg type, [HP_{2}Mo_{5}O_{23}]^{4−}

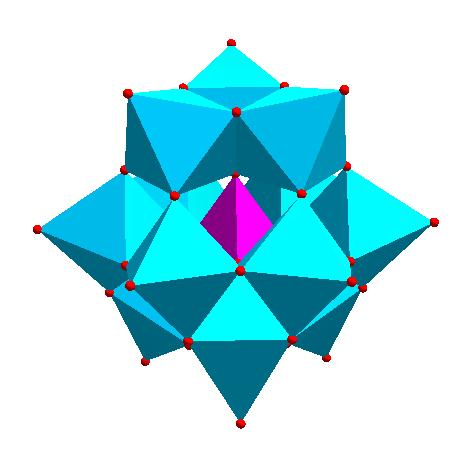
α-Keggin type, [XM_{12}O_{40}]^{n−}

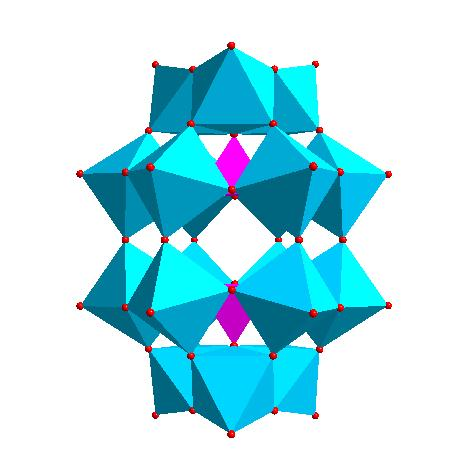
α-Dawson type, [X_{2}M_{18}O_{62}]^{n−}

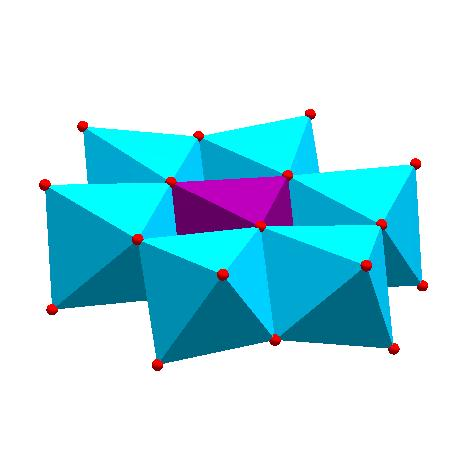
Anderson type, [XM_{6}O_{24}]^{n−}

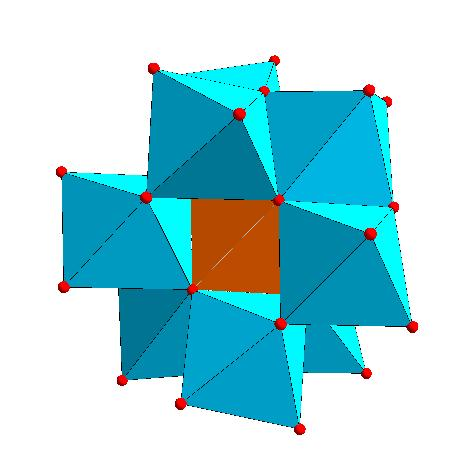
Allman–Waugh type, [XM_{9}O_{32}]^{n−}

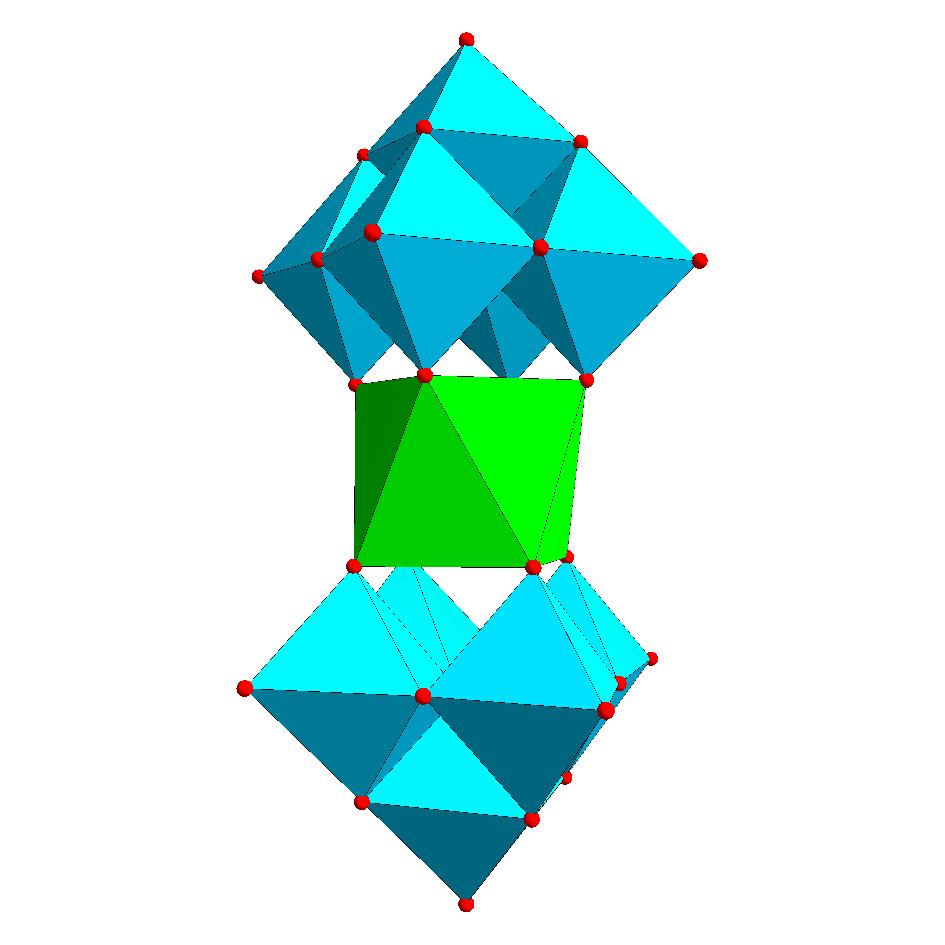
Weakley–Yamase type, [XM_{10}O_{36}]^{n−}

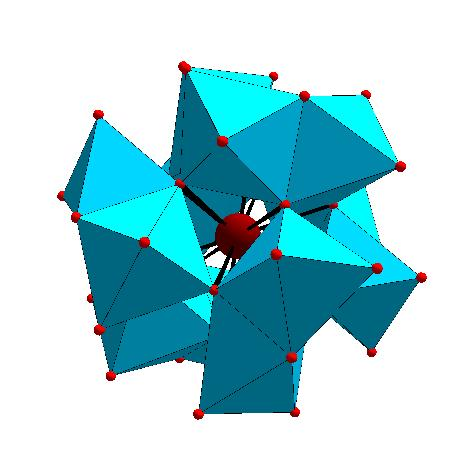
Dexter–Silverton type, [XM_{12}O_{42}]^{n−}

=== Heteropolyacids ===
Generally, the heteropoly(oxo)metalates are more thermally robust than isopoly(oxo)metalates. This trend reflects the stabilizing influence of the tetrahedral oxyanion that "glues" together the transition metal oxo framework. One reflection of their ruggedness, heteropolymetalates can be isolated in their acid form, whereas homopolymetalates typically cannot. Examples include:

- Silicotungstic acid, H_{4}SiW_{12}O_{40}·nH_{2}O
- Phosphomolybdic acid, H_{3}Mo_{12}PO_{40}·nH_{2}O
- Phosphotungstic acid, H_{3}W_{12}PO_{40}·nH_{2}O

=== Isomerism ===
The Keggin structure type has 5 isomers, which are obtained by (conceptually) rotating one or more of the four M_{3}O_{13} units through 60°.

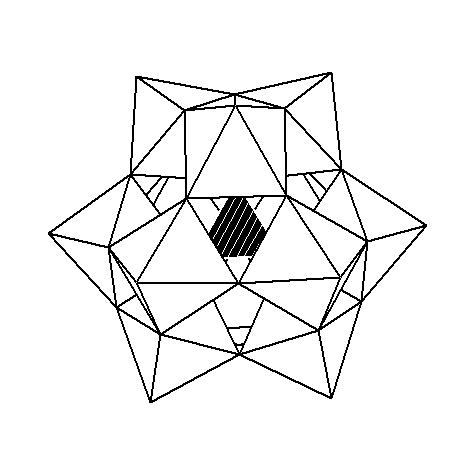
α-Keggin isomer

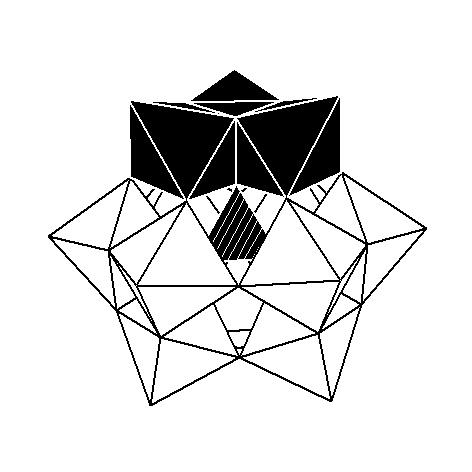
β-Keggin isomer

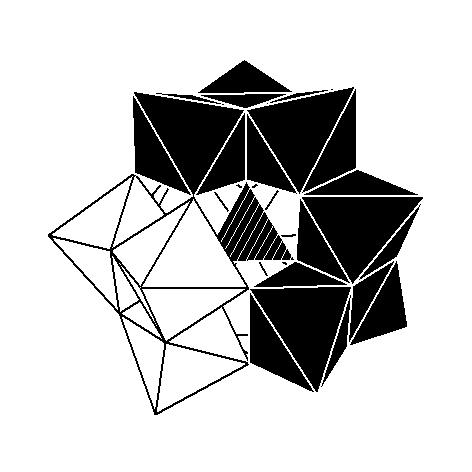
γ-Keggin isomer

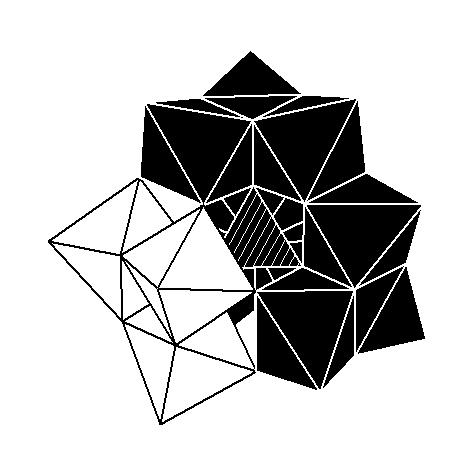
δ-Keggin isomer

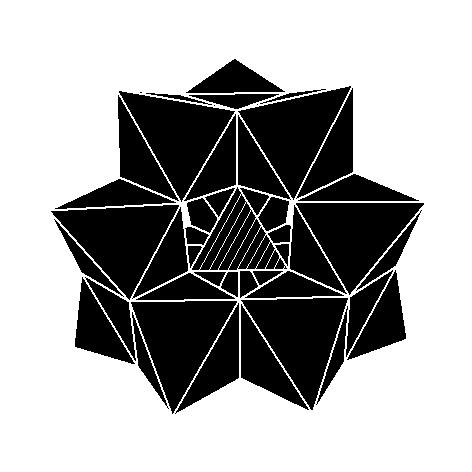
ε-Keggin isomer

== Lacunary structures ==
The structure of some POMs are derived from a larger POM's structure by removing one or more addenda atoms and their attendant oxide ions, giving a defect structure called a lacunary structure. An example of a compound with a Dawson lacunary structure is As_{2}W_{15}O_{56}. In 2014, vanadate species with similar, selective metal-binding properties were reported.

== Uses ==
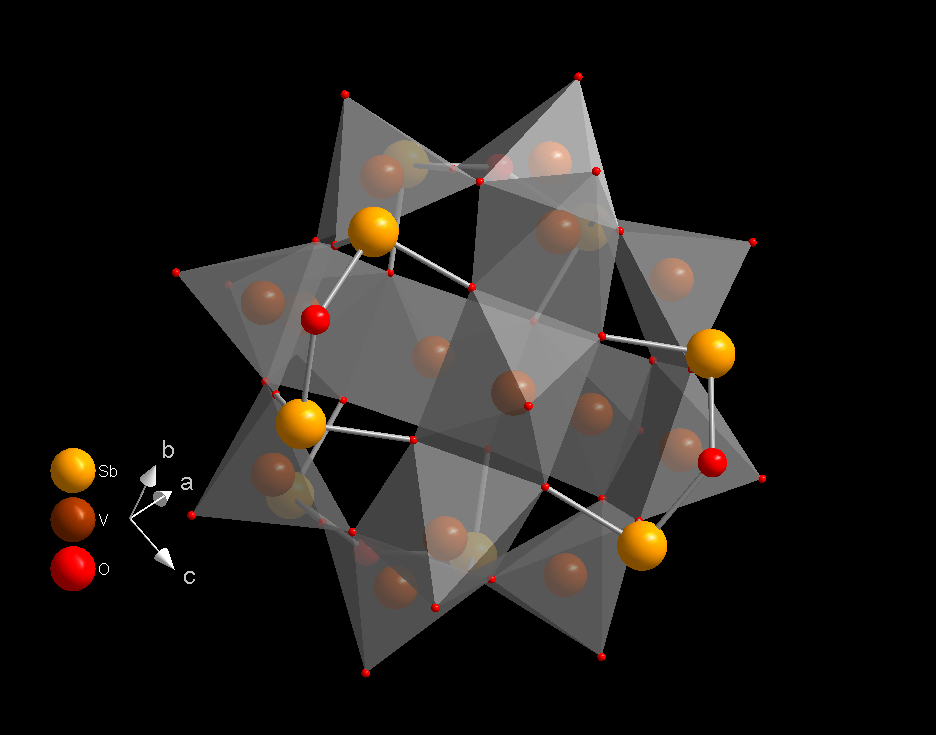
A polyoxovanadate (POV) of the species V_{14}Sb_{8}O_{42} in the alpha form. The isomers differ by the position of the half-rings toward each other. This POVs can be linked e.g. by octahedrally coordinated nickel(II).

This type of acid is a common re-usable acid catalyst in chemical reactions.

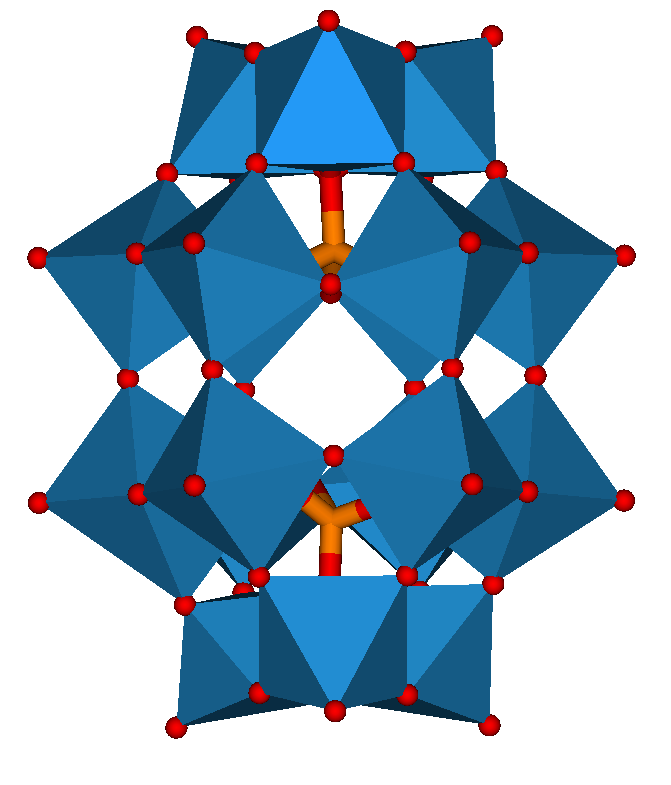
Dawson ion Dawson structure, [X_{2}M_{18}O_{62}]^{n−}

The heteropolyacids are widely used as homogeneous and heterogeneous catalysts, particularly those based on the Keggin structure as they can possess qualities such as good thermal stability, high acidity and high oxidising ability. Some examples of catalysis are:

- Homogeneous acid catalysis
  - hydrolysis of propene to give propan-2-ol by H_{3}PMo_{12}O_{40} and H_{3}PW_{12}O_{40}
  - Prins reaction by H_{3}PW_{12}O_{40}
  - polymerisation of tetrahydrofuran by H_{3}PW_{12}O_{40}
- Heterogeneous acid catalysis
  - dehydration of propan-2-ol to propene and methanol to hydrocarbons by H_{3}PW_{12}O_{40}
  - reformation of hexane to 2-methylpentane (isohexane) by H_{3}PW_{12}O_{40} on SiO_{2}
- Homogeneous oxidation
  - cyclohexene + H_{2}O_{2} to adipic acid by the mixed addenda H_{3}PMo_{6}V_{6}O_{40}
  - ketone by O_{2} to acid and aldehyde by mixed addenda H_{5}PMo_{10}V_{2}O_{40}

Heteropolyacids have long been used in analysis and histology and are a component of many reagents e.g. the Folin-Ciocalteu reagent, folins phenol reagent used in the Lowry protein assay and EPTA, ethanolic phosphotungstic acid.

== See also ==
- Polyoxometalate
- Phosphomolybdic acid
- Phosphotungstic acid
- Silicotungstic acid
