= Phosphotungstic acid =

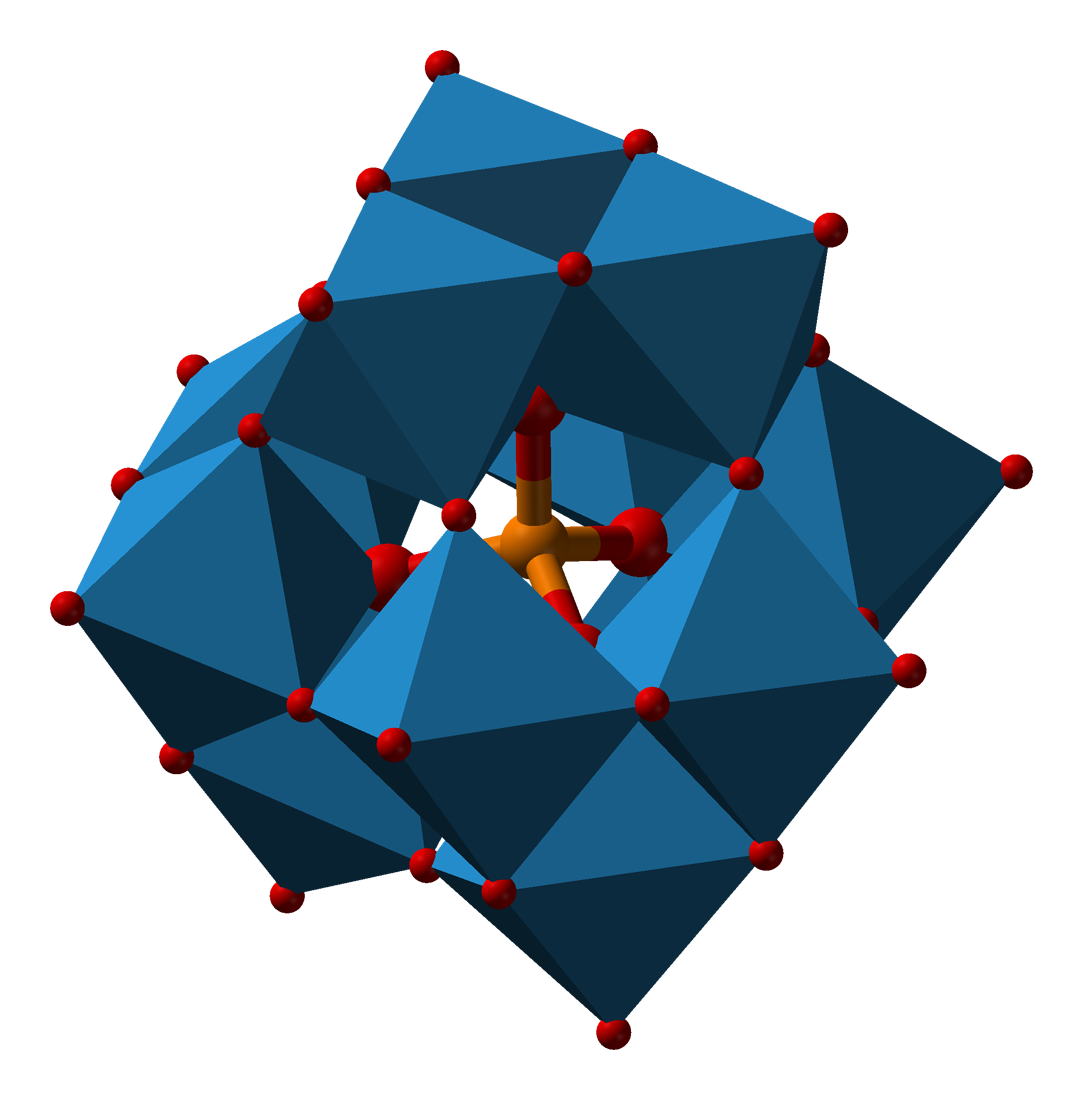
- Structure of the phosphotungstate anion

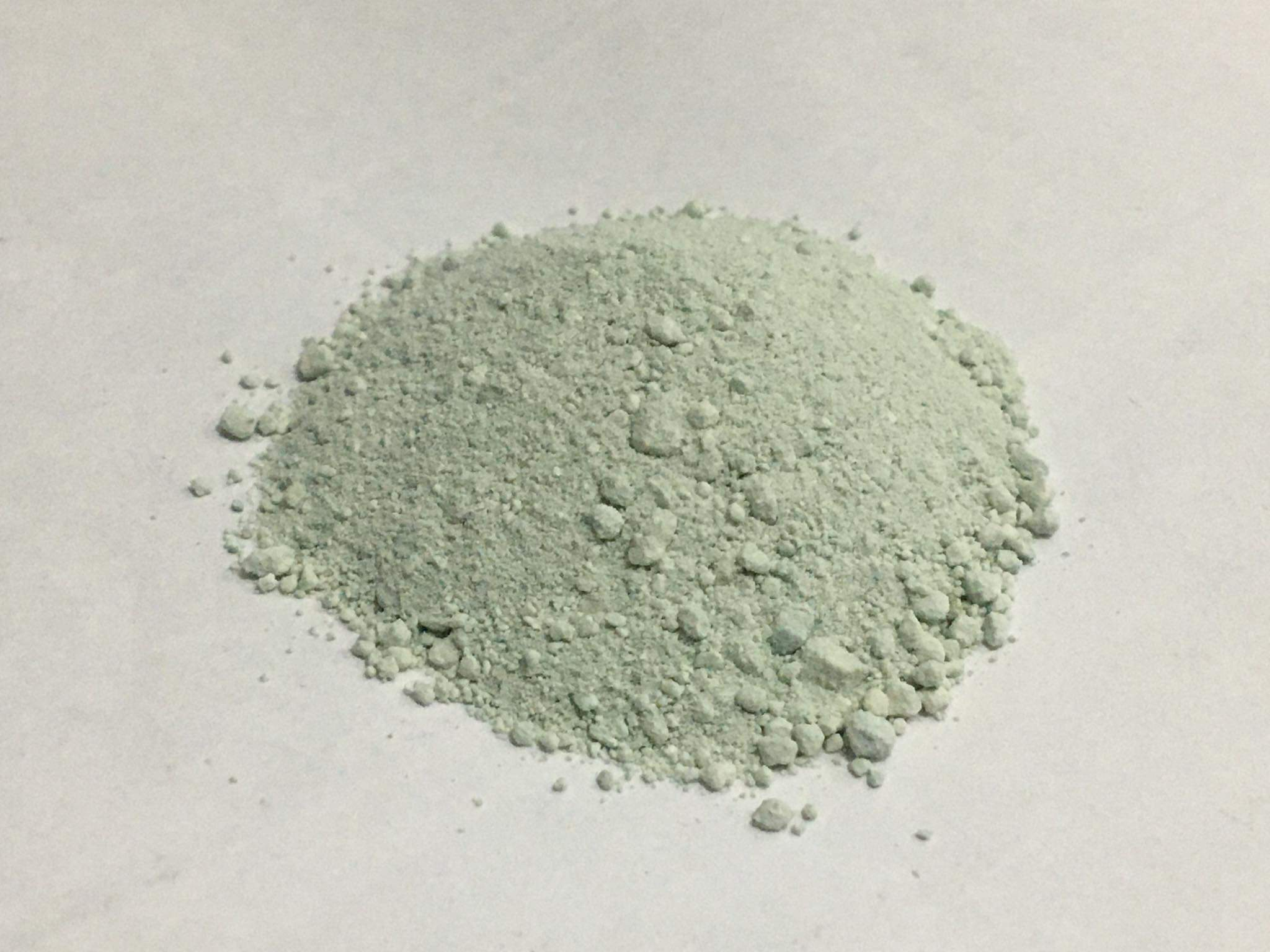

Names
- Other names Tungstophosphoric acid (TPA); Phosphotungstic acid (PTA, PWA) 12-Phosphotungstic acid 12-Tungstophosphoric acid Dodecatungstophosphoric acid

Identifiers
CAS Number	1343-93-7; (hydrate): 12501-23-4
3D model (JSmol)	Interactive image
ChemSpider	21241328
ECHA InfoCard	100.108.885
EC Number	(hydrate): 603-020-3
PubChem CID	(hydrate): 16212977
UNII	5KAC2X78XM
CompTox Dashboard (EPA)	DTXSID30583755
- InChI: (hydrate): InChI=1S/H3O4P.H2O.36O.12W/c1-5(2,3)4;;;;;;;;;;;;;;;;;;;;;;;;;;;;;;;;;;;;;;;;;;;;;;;;;/h(H3,1,2,3,4);1H2;;;;;;;;;;;;;;;;;;;;;;;;;;;;;;;;;;;;;;;;;;;;;;;; Key: AVFBYUADVDVJQL-UHFFFAOYSA-N
- SMILES: [W]18%21%24(O[W]%16%18%23(O[W]56(O1)(O[W]247(O[W]9%22(O[W]%12%13(O2)(O[W]3%11%14(O[W]%17%19(O[W](O3)(O4)(O5)([O++]67[P+]%15%20[O++]89[W]%10(O[W](O[W](O%10)(O%11)(O%12)([O++]%13%14%15)[O-])(O%16)(O%17)([O++]%18%19%20)[O-])(O%21)(O%22)[O-])[O-])(O%23)[O-])[O-])[O-])(O%24)O)[O-])O)[O-])O

Properties
Chemical formula	H_{3}[PW_{12}O_{40}]
Molar mass	2880.2 g/mol (anhydrous)
Melting point	89 °C (192 °F; 362 K) (hydrate)

Hazards
- GHS labelling
Pictograms	(GHS05: Corrosive) (GHS07: Exclamation mark) (GHS09: Environmental hazard)
Signal word	Danger
Hazard statements	H302, H314, H411
Precautionary statements	P260, P264, P270, P273, P280, P301+P312, P301+P330+P331, P303+P361+P353, P304+P340, P305+P351+P338, P310, P321, P330, P363, P391, P405, P501
- Except where otherwise noted, data are given for materials in their standard state (at 25 °C [77 °F], 100 kPa). verify (what is ?) Infobox references

Phosphotungstic acid (PTA) or tungstophosphoric acid (TPA), is a heteropoly acid with the chemical formula H_{3}PW_{12}O_{40}]. It forms hydrates H_{3}[PW_{12}O_{40}]·nH_{2}O. It is normally isolated as the n = 24 hydrate but can be desiccated to the hexahydrate (n = 6). EPTA is the name of ethanolic phosphotungstic acid, its alcohol solution used in biology. It has the appearance of small, colorless-grayish or slightly yellow-green crystals, with melting point 89 °C (24H_{2}O hydrate). It is odorless and soluble in water (200 g/100 ml). It is not especially toxic, but is rather corrosive. The compound is known by a variety of names and acronyms (see 'other names' section of infobox).

In these names the "12" or "dodeca" reflects the fact that the anion contains 12 tungsten atoms. Some early workers who did not know the structure called it phospho-24-tungstic acid, formulating it as 3H_{2}O·P_{2}O_{5}·24WO_{3}·59H_{2}O, (P_{2}W_{24}O_{80}H_{6})·29H_{2}O, which correctly identifies the atomic ratios of P, W and O. This formula was still quoted in papers as late as 1970.

Phosphotungstic acid is used in histology as a component for staining of cell specimens, often together with haematoxylin as PTAH. It binds to fibrin, collagen, and fibres of connective tissues, and replaces the anions of dyes from these materials, selectively decoloring them.

Phosphotungstic acid is electron dense, opaque for electrons. It is a common negative stain for viruses, nerves, polysaccharides, and other biological tissue materials for imaging by a transmission electron microscope.

== Structure ==
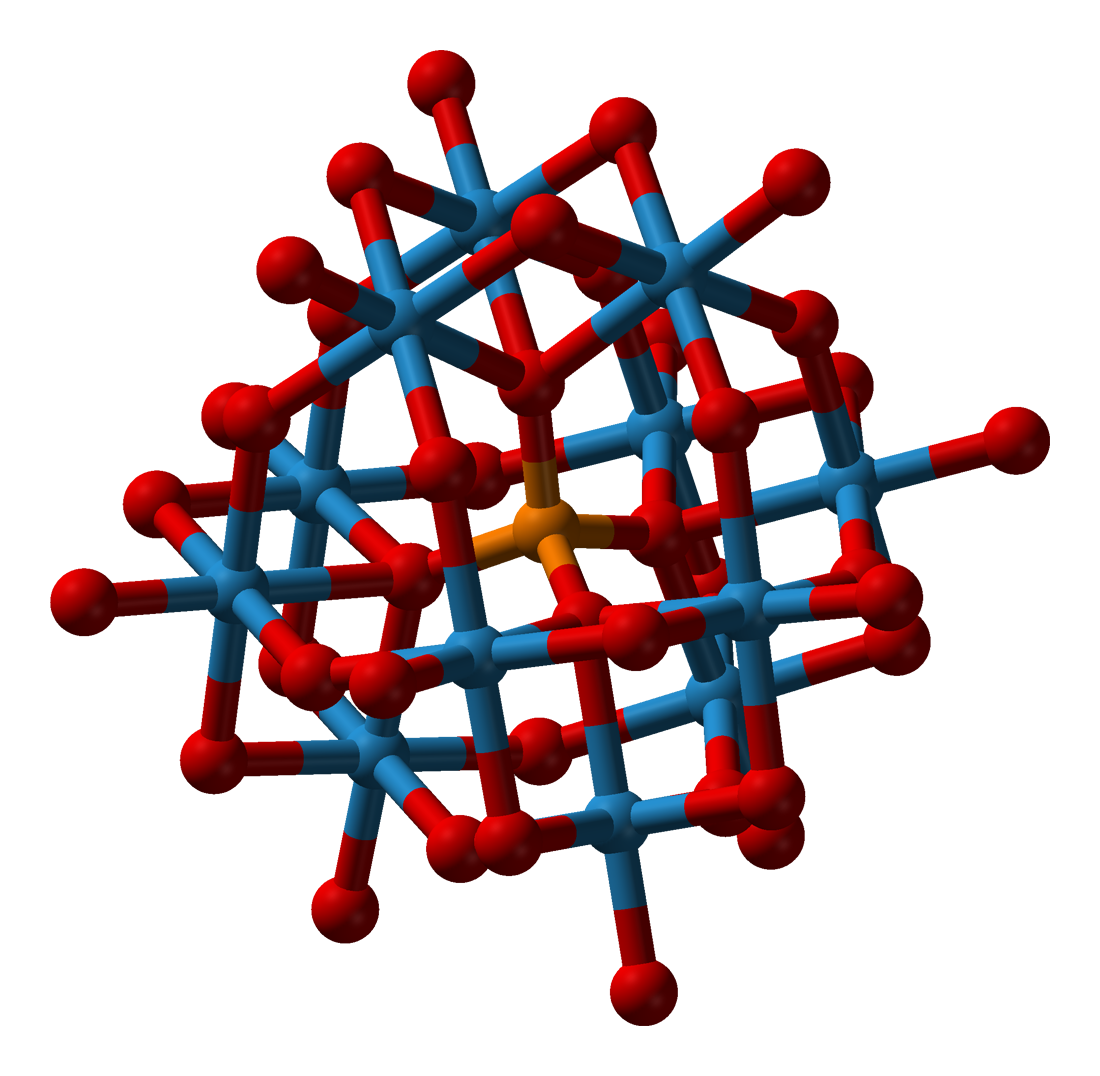
Structure of the phosphotungstate anion

Gouzerh summarises the historical views on the structure of phosphotungstic acid leading up to Keggin's determination of the structure as:

- H_{7}[P(W_{2}O_{7})_{6}] proposed by Miolati and further developed by Rosenheim
- H_{3}[PO_{4}W_{12}O_{18}(OH)_{36}] (Pauling)

The structure was determined by J.F Keggin first published in 1933 and then in 1934 and is generally known as the Keggin structure. The anion has full tetrahedral symmetry and comprises a cage of twelve tungsten atoms linked by oxygen atoms with the phosphorus atom at its centre. The picture on the right shows the octahedral coordination of oxygen atoms around the tungsten atoms, and that the surface of the anion has both bridging and terminal oxygen atoms. Further investigation showed that the compound was a hexahydrate not a pentahydrate as Keggin had proposed.

== Preparation and chemical properties ==
Phosphotungstic acid can be prepared by the reaction of sodium tungstate dihydrate, Na_{2}WO_{4}·2H_{2}O, with phosphoric acid, H_{3}PO_{4}, acidified with hydrochloric acid, HCl. This procedure has been updated.

Phosphotungstic acid solutions decompose as the pH is increased. A step-wise decomposition has been determined and the approximate compositions at various pH values are as follows:

pH	principal components
1.0	[PW_{12}O_{40}]^{3−}
2.2	[PW_{12}O_{40}]^{3−}, [P_{2}W_{21}O_{71}]^{6−}, [PW_{11}O_{39}]^{7−}
3.5	[PW_{12}O_{40}]^{3−}, [P_{2}W_{21}O_{71}]^{6−}, [PW_{11}O_{39}]^{7−}, [P_{2}W_{18}O_{62}]^{6−}, [P_{2}W_{19}O_{67}]^{10−}
5.4	[P_{2}W_{21}O_{71}]^{6−}, [PW_{11}O_{39}]^{7−}, [P_{2}W_{18}O_{62}]^{6−}
7.3	[PW_{9}O_{34}]^{9−}
8.3	PO_{4}^{3−}, WO_{4}^{2−}

The species [PW_{11}O_{39}]^{7−} is a lacunary, or defective Keggin ion. The [P_{2}W_{18}O_{62}]^{6−} has a Dawson structure. At pH less than 8, the presence of ethanol or acetone stabilises the anion, [PW_{12}O_{40}]^{3−}, reducing decomposition.

Tungstophosphoric acid is thermally stable up to 400 °C, and is more stable than the analogous silicotungstic acid, H_{4}[SiW_{12}O_{40}].

Large quantities of polar molecules such as pyridine are absorbed into the bulk phase and not simply adsorbed onto the surface. Solid state NMR studies of ethanol absorbed in the bulk phase show that both protonated dimers, (C_{2}H_{5}OH)_{2}H^{+}, and monomers, C_{2}H_{5}OH_{2}^{+}, are present.

Phosphotungstic acid is less sensitive to reduction than phosphomolybdic acid. Reduction with uric acid or iron(II) sulfate produces a brown coloured compound. the related silicotungstic acid when reduced forms a similar brown compound where one of the four W_{3} units in the Keggin structure becomes a metal-metal bonded cluster of three edge shared W^{IV} octahedra.

Phosphotungstic acid is the strongest of heteropolyacids. Its conjugate base is the [PW_{12}O_{40}]^{3−} anion. Its acidity in acetic acid has been investigated and shows that the three protons dissociate independently rather than sequentially, and the acid sites are of the same strength. One estimate of the acidity is that the solid has an acidity stronger than H_{0} = −13.16, which would qualify the compound as a superacid. This acidic strength means that even at low pH the acid is fully dissociated.

== Uses ==
=== Catalyst ===
In common with the other heteropolyacids phosphotungstic acid is a catalyst and its high acidity and thermal stability make it a catalyst of choice according to some researchers. It is in solution as a homogeneous catalyst, and as a heterogeneous catalyst "supported" on a substrate e.g. alumina, silica. Some acid catalysed reactions include:

- the homogeneous catalysis of the hydrolysis of propene to give 2-propanol
- the homogeneous catalysis of the Prins reaction
- the heterogeneous catalysis of the dehydration of 2-propanol to propene and methanol to hydrocarbons.

=== Dyeing and pigments ===
Phosphotungstic acid has been used to precipitate different types of dyes as "lakes". Examples are basic dyes and triphenylmethane dyes, e.g. pararosaniline derivatives.

=== Histology ===
Phosphotungstic acid is used in histology for staining specimens, as a component of phosphotungstic acid haematoxylin, PTAH, and “trichrome” reagents, and as a negative stain for imaging by a transmission electron microscope.

Phosphotungstic acid haematoxylin (PTAH)

Mallory described the reagent now generally known as PTAH in 1897. PTAH stains tissues either reddish brown or blue depending on their type. This property of simultaneously staining two different colours is different from other haematoxylin reagents e.g. alum-haematoxylin. The role of phosphotungstic acid and the mechanism of staining is not fully understood. The active component of haematoxylin is the oxidised form, haematin, although this rarely acknowledged in the literature which refer to haematoxylin staining. Phosphotungstic acid forms a lake with haematin. The make –up of the reagent is uncertain, examination of a year old sample showed there to be three coloured components, blue, red and yellow. These were not identified. Some investigations of “model” systems, reacting various compounds such as amino acids, purines, pyrimidines and amines with PTAH show that they give rise to different colours.

Trichrome reagents
In these reagents two or three basic dyes are used with phosphotungstic acid, in either a one step or multi-stage procedure. These reagents colour different tissue types different colours. Again the mechanism of staining is not fully understood. Some explanations include the proposal that phosphotungstic acid acts as a mordant to bind the dye to the tissue or that alternatively it binds to tissue blocking it to dye molecules.

Negative staining
Adsorption onto tissue or the surface of viruses and its electron density are the bases of phosphotungstic acids action as a negative stain. This electron density arises from the presence of the 12 tungsten atoms which each have an atomic number of 74. The mechanism of the adsorption onto tissue has been proposed as being electrostatic rather than involving hydrogen bonding, as adsorption is not affected by pH.

=== Analysis ===
The potassium salt is only slightly soluble, unlike most other phosphotungstate salts, and has been proposed as a method for the gravimetric analysis of potassium.

=== Precipitation of proteins ===
In a number of analytical procedures one of the roles of phosphotungstic acid is to precipitate out proteins. It has been termed a "universal" precipitant for polar proteins. Further studies showed that no precipitation occurred with α-amino groups but did occur with guanidino, ε-amino and imidazole groups.

=== Medicinal ===
Very little work appears to have been carried out in this area. One example relates to liver necrosis in rats.

=== Composite proton exchange membranes ===
The heteropoly acids, including phosphotungstic acid, are being investigated as materials in composite proton exchange membranes, such as Nafion. The interest lies in the potential of these composite materials in the manufacture of fuel cells as they have improved operating characteristics.

== See also ==
- Phosphomolybdic acid
