= Tungstic acid =

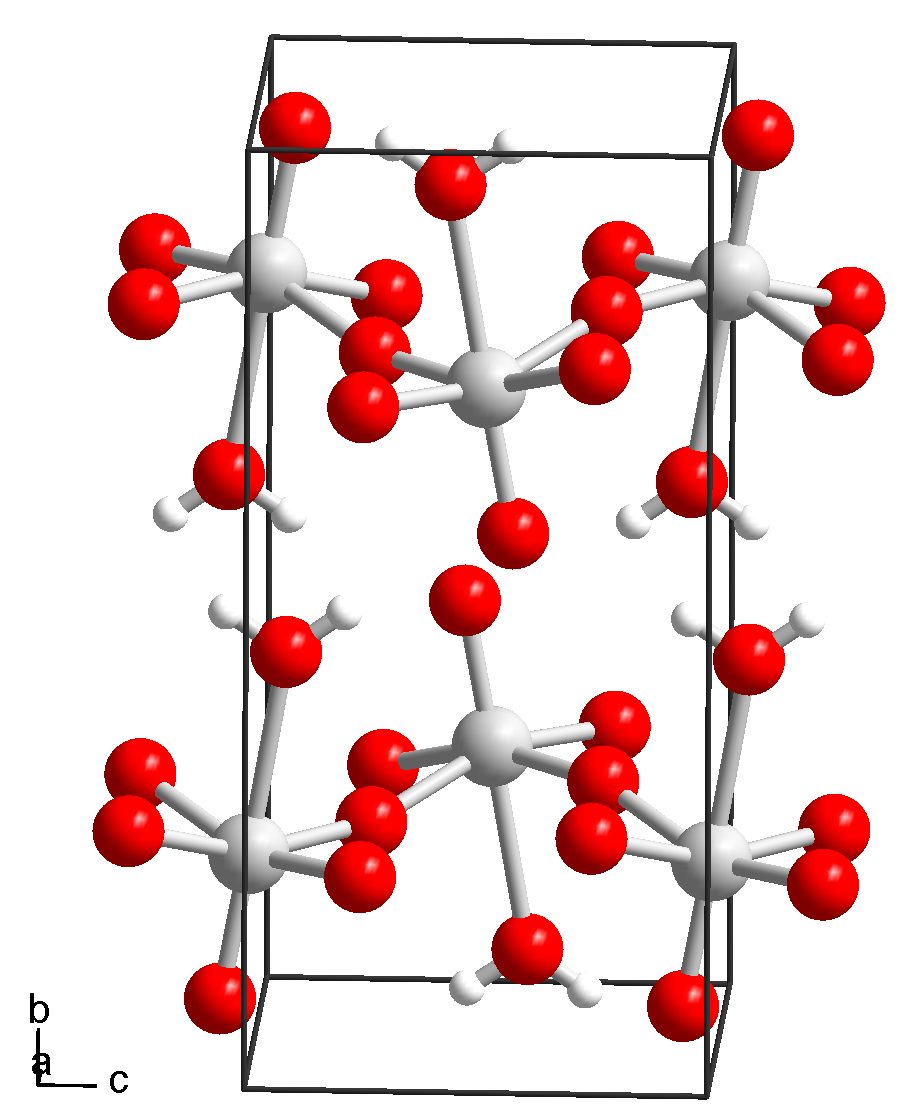
- Dihydroxy-dioxotungsten

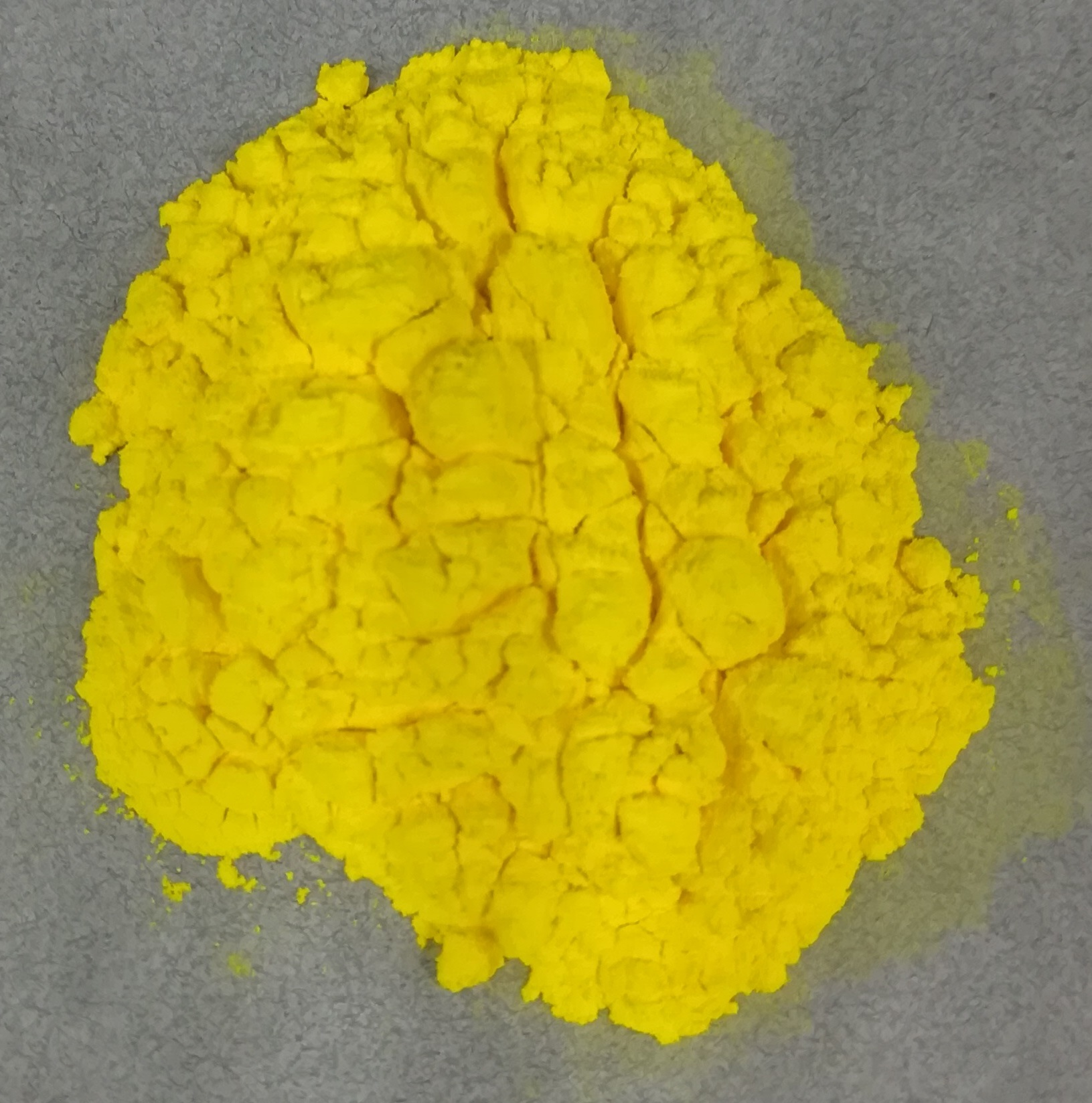
- Yellow tungstic acid sample

Names
- IUPAC name Tungstic acid
- Systematic IUPAC name Dihydroxydioxotungsten
- Other names Orthotungstic acid

Identifiers
CAS Number	7783-03-1
3D model (JSmol)	Interactive image
ChemSpider	1120
ECHA InfoCard	100.029.068
EC Number	231-975-2
PubChem CID	1152
RTECS number	YO7840000
UNII	J4D6K0RX2G
CompTox Dashboard (EPA)	DTXSID80894161
- InChI: InChI=1S/2H2O.2O.W/h2*1H2;;;/q;;;;+2/p-2 Key: CMPGARWFYBADJI-UHFFFAOYSA-L
- SMILES: O[W](=O)(=O)O

Properties
Chemical formula	H_{2}WO_{4}
Molar mass	249.853 g/mol
Appearance	yellow powder
Density	5.59 g/cm^{3}
Melting point	100 °C (212 °F; 373 K) (decomposes)
Boiling point	1,473 °C (2,683 °F; 1,746 K)
Solubility in water	insoluble
Solubility	soluble in HF, ammonia slightly soluble in ethanol

Hazards
NFPA 704 (fire diamond)	2 0 0
- Except where otherwise noted, data are given for materials in their standard state (at 25 °C [77 °F], 100 kPa). verify (what is ?) Infobox references

Tungstic acid refers to hydrated forms of tungsten trioxide, WO_{3}. Both a monohydrate (WO_{3}·H_{2}O) and hemihydrate (WO_{3}·^{1}/_{2} H_{2}O) are known. Molecular species akin to sulfuric acid, i.e. (HO)_{2}WO_{2} are not observed.

The solid-state structure of WO_{3}·H_{2}O consists of layers of octahedrally coordinated WO_{5}(H_{2}O) units where 4 vertices are shared. The dihydrate has the same layer structure with the extra H_{2}O molecule intercalated. The monohydrate is a yellow solid and insoluble in water. The classical name for this acid is 'acid of wolfram'. Salts of tungstic acid are tungstates.

The acid was discovered by Carl Wilhelm Scheele in 1781.

== Preparation ==
Tungstic acid is obtained by the action of strong acids on solutions of alkali metallic tungstates. It can also be obtained from pure tungsten by reaction with hydrogen peroxide. Most tungsten(VI) compounds hydrolyze into tungstic acid or a mix of tungstates, except for stable polyoxometallates such as phosphotungstic acid.

== Uses ==
It is used as a mordant and a dye in textiles.
