= Keggin structure =

Best known structural form for heteropoly acids

Keggin structure

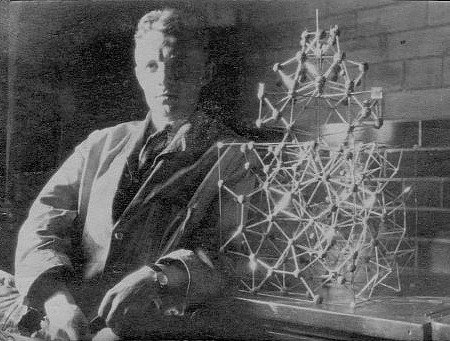
James F. Keggin, the discoverer of the Keggin Structure.

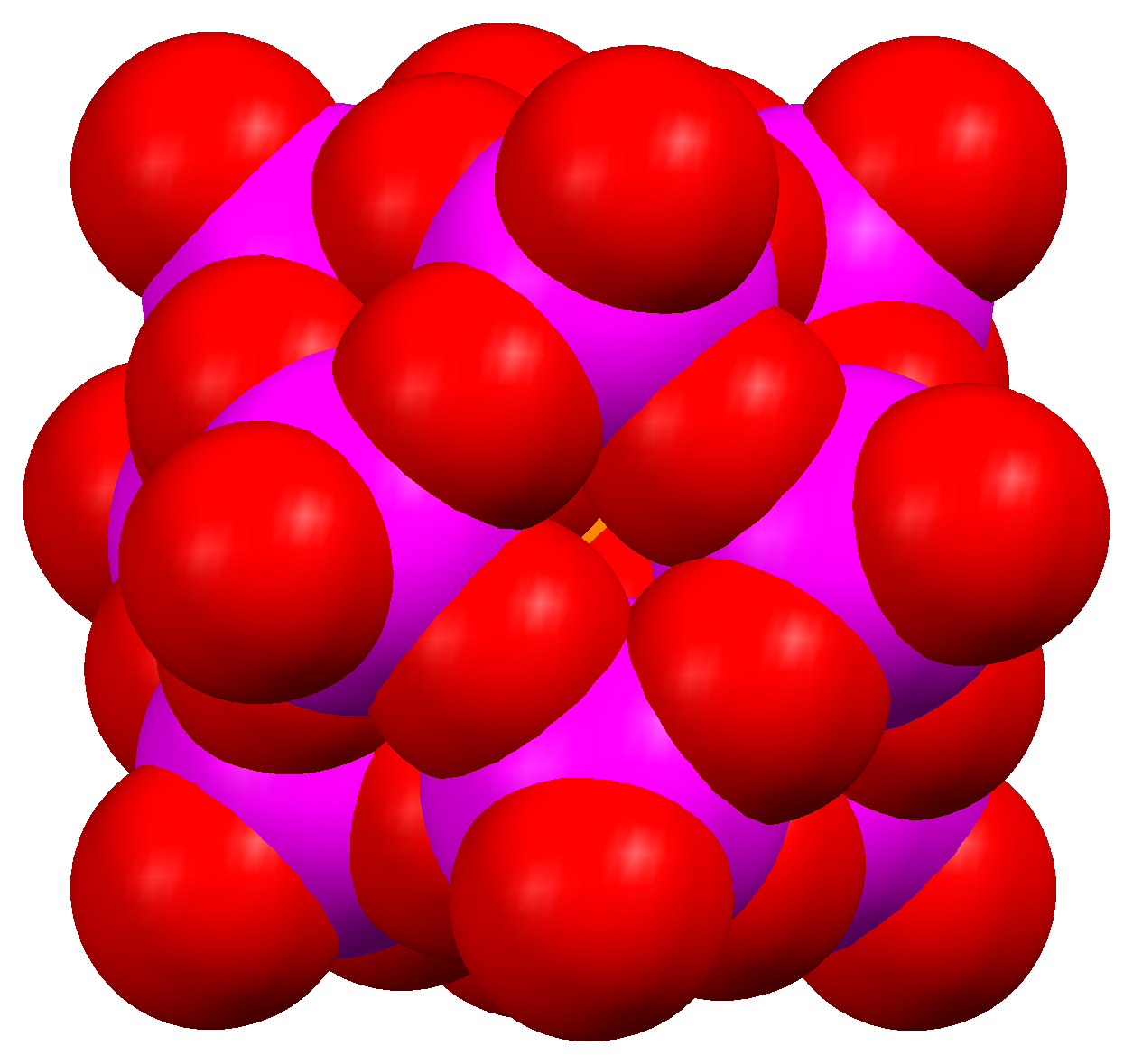
Keggin structure

The Keggin structure is the best known structural form for heteropoly acids. It is the structural form of α-Keggin anions, having a general formula of [XM_{12}O_{40}]^{n}^{−}, where X is the heteroatom (most commonly are pentavalent phosphorus P^{V}, tetravalent silicon Si^{IV}, or trivalent boron B^{III}), M is the addendum atom (most common are molybdenum Mo and tungsten W), and O represents oxygen. The structure self-assembles in acidic aqueous solution and is a commonly used as a type of polyoxometalate catalysts.

== History ==
The first α-Keggin anion, ammonium phosphomolybdate ([NH_{4}]_{3}[PMo_{12}O_{40}]), was first reported by Jöns Jakob Berzelius in 1826. In 1892, Blomstrand proposed the structure of phosphomolybdic acid and other poly-acids as a chain or ring configuration. Alfred Werner, using the coordination compounds ideas of Copaux, attempted to explain the structure of silicotungstic acid. He assumed a central group, [SiO_{4}]^{4−} ion, enclosed by four [RW_{2}O_{6}]^{+}, where R is a unipositive ion. The [RW_{2}O_{6}]^{+} are linked to the central group by primary valences. Two more R_{2}W_{2}O_{7} groups were linked to the central group by secondary valences. This proposal accounted for the characteristics of most poly-acids, but not all.

In 1928, Linus Pauling proposed a structure for α-Keggin anions consisting of a tetrahedral central ion, [XO_{4}]^{n−8}, caged by twelve WO_{6} octahedra. In this proposed structure, three of the oxygen on each of the octahedra shared electrons with three neighboring octahedra. As a result, 18 oxygen atoms were used as bridging atoms between the metal atoms. The remaining oxygen atoms were bonded to a proton. This structure explained many characteristics that were observed such as basicities of alkali metal salts and the hydrated form of some of the salts. However the structure could not explain the structure of dehydrated acids.

James Fargher Keggin with the use of X-ray diffraction experimentally determined the structure of α-Keggin anions in 1934. The Keggin structure accounts for both the hydrated and dehydrated α-Keggin anions without the need for significant structural change. The Keggin structure is the widely accepted structure for the α-Keggin anions.

== Structure and physical properties ==
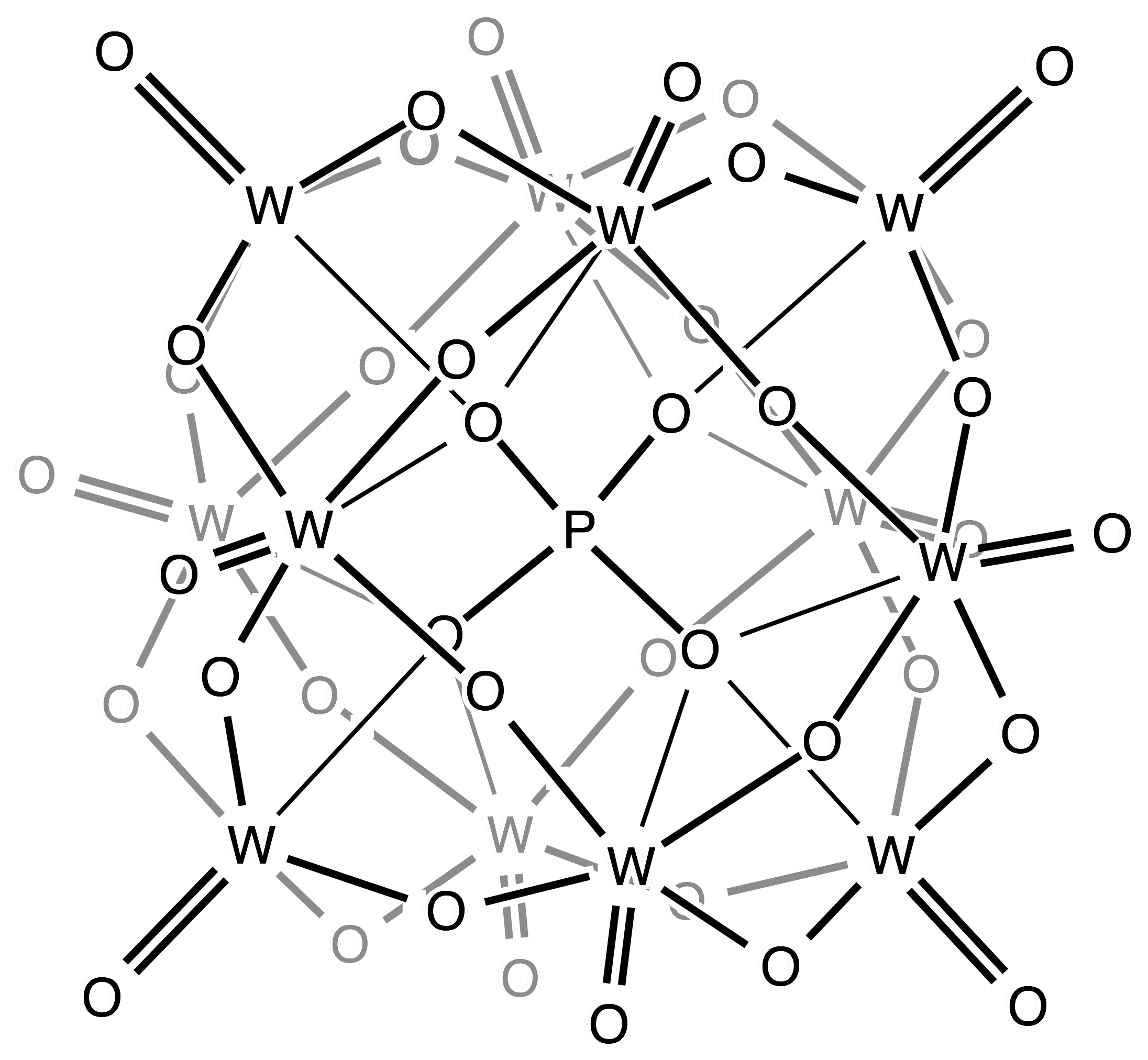
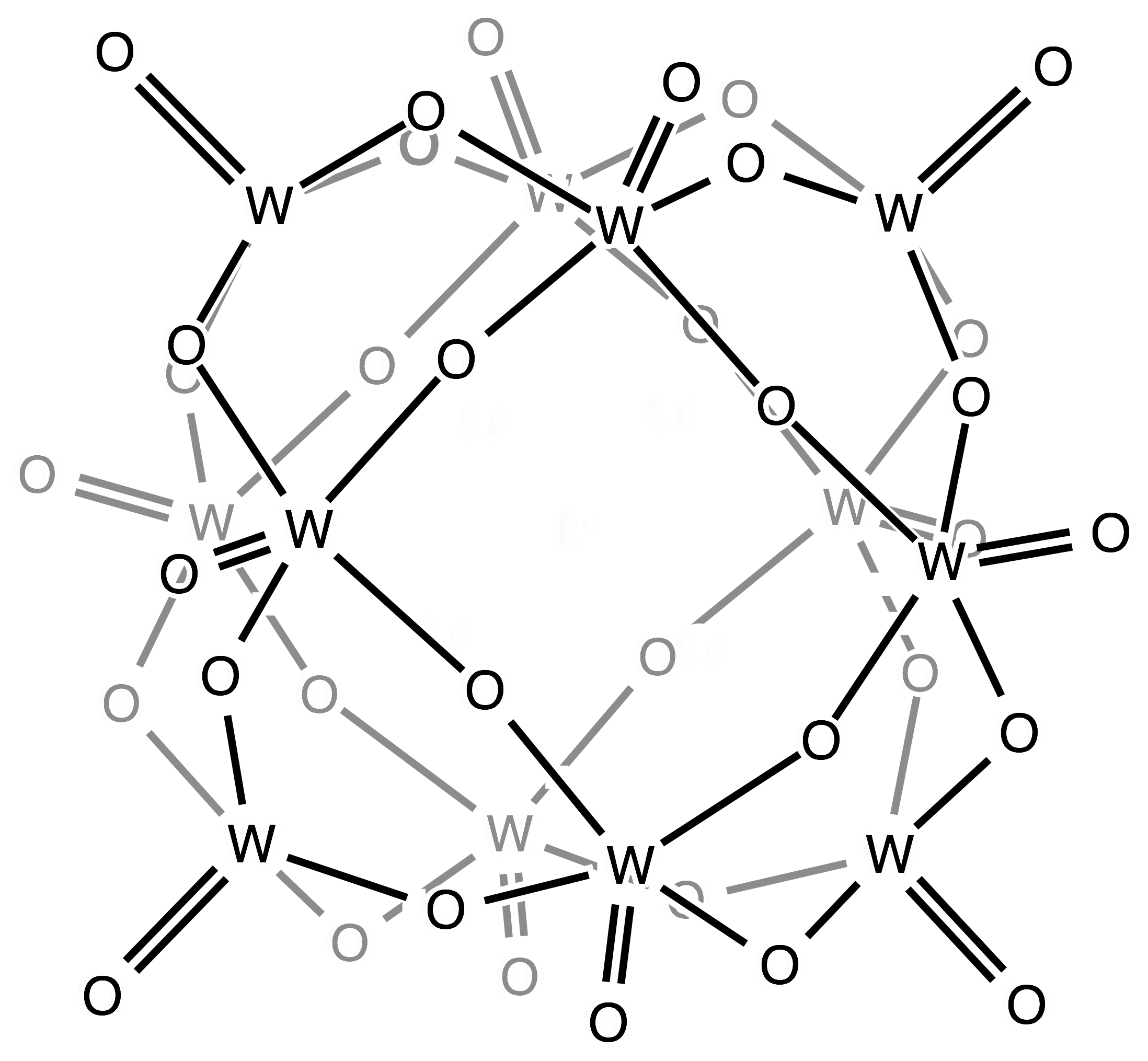
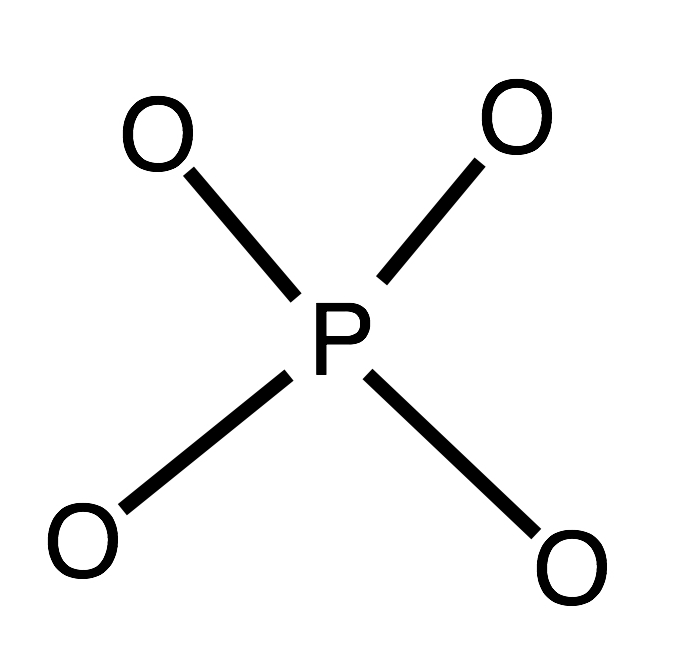
= +

The structure has full tetrahedral symmetry and is composed of one heteroatom surrounded by four oxygen atoms to form a tetrahedron. The heteroatom is located centrally and caged by 12 octahedral MO_{6} units linked to one another by the neighboring oxygen atoms. There are a total of 24 bridging oxygen atoms that link the 12 addenda atoms. The metal centres in the 12 octahedra are arranged on a sphere almost equidistant from each other, in four M_{3}O_{13} units, giving the complete structure an overall tetrahedral symmetry. The bond length between atoms varies depending on the heteroatom (X) and the addenda atoms (M). For the 12–phosphotungstic acid, Keggin determined the bond length between the heteroatom and each the four central oxygen atoms to be 1.5 Å. The bond length forms the central oxygen to the addenda atoms is 2.43 Å. The bond length between the addenda atoms and each of the bridging oxygen is 1.9 Å. The remaining 12 oxygen atoms that are each double bonded to an addenda atom have a bond length of 1.70 Å. The octahedra are therefore distorted. This structure allows the molecule to hydrate and dehydrate without significant structural changes and the molecule is thermally stable in the solid state for use in vapor phase reactions at high temperatures (400−500 °C).

=== Isomerism ===
Including the original Keggin structure there are 5 isomers, designated by the prefixes α-, β-, γ-, δ- and ε-. The original Keggin structure is designated α. These isomers are sometimes termed Baker, Baker–Figgis or rotational isomers, These involve different rotational orientations of the Mo_{3}O_{13} units, which lowers the symmetry of the overall structure.

=== Lacunary Keggin structures ===
The term lacunary is applied to ions which have a fragment missing, sometimes called defect structures. Examples are the [XM_{11}O_{39}]^{n}^{−} and [XM_{9}O_{34}]^{n}^{−} formed by the removal from the Keggin structure of sufficient Mo and O atoms to eliminate 1 or 3 adjacent MO_{6} octahedra. The Dawson structure is made up of two Keggin lacunary fragments with 3 missing octahedra.

=== Group 13 cations with the Keggin structure ===
The cluster cation [Al_{13}O_{4}(OH)_{24}(H_{2}O)_{12}]^{7+} has the Keggin structure with a tetrahedral Al atom in the centre of the cluster coordinated to 4 oxygen atoms. The formula can be expressed as [AlO_{4}Al_{12}(OH)_{24}(H_{2}O)_{12}]^{7+}. This ion is generally called the Al_{13} ion. A Ga_{13} analogue is known an unusual ionic compound with an Al_{13} cation and a Keggin polyoxoanion has been characterised.

=== The iron Keggin ion ===
Due to the similar aqueous chemistries of aluminium and iron, it was earlier thought that an analogous iron polycation should be isolatable from water. Moreover, in 2007, the structure of ferrihydrite was determined and shown to be built of iron Keggin ions. This further captured scientists' imagination and drive to isolate the iron Keggin ion. In 2015, the iron Keggin ion was isolated from water, but as a polyanion with a −17 charge; and protecting chemistry was required. Iron-bound water is very acidic; so it is difficult to capture the intermediate Keggin ion form without bulky and nonprotic ligands instead of the water that is found in the aluminum Keggin ion. However, more important in this synthesis was the bismuth (Bi^{3+}) counterions that provided high positive charge to stabilize the high negative charge of the heptadecavalent polyanion.

== Chemical properties ==
The stability of the Keggin structure allows the metals in the anion to be readily reduced. Depending on the solvent, acidity of the solution and the charge on the α-Keggin anion, it can be reversibly reduced in one- or multiple-electron steps. For example, the silicotungstate anion can be reduced a −20 state. Some anions such as silicotungstic acid are strong enough as an acid as sulfuric acid and can be used in its place as an acid catalyst.

== Preparation ==
In general α-Keggin anions are synthesized in acidic solutions. For example, 12-phosphotungstic acid is formed by condensing phosphate ion with tungstate ions. The heteropolyacid that is formed has the Keggin structure.

PO^{3−}_{4} + 12 WO^{2−}_{4} + 27 H^{+} → H_{3}PW_{12}O_{40} + 12 H_{2}O

== Uses ==
α-Keggin anions have been used as catalyst in the following reactions: hydration, polymerization and oxidation reaction as catalysts. Japanese chemical companies have commercialized the use of the compounds in hydration of propene, oxidation of methacrolein, hydration of isobutene and n-butene, and polymerization of THF.

== Suppliers ==
12-Phosphotungstic acid, the compound James F. Keggin used to determine the structure, can be purchased commercially. Other compounds that contain the α-Keggin anion such as silicotungstic acid and phosphomolybdic acid are also commercially available at Aldrich Chemicals, Fisher Chemicals, Alfa Aesar, VWR Chemical, American Elements, and others.
