= Prins reaction =

Chemical reaction involving organic compounds

Named after	Hendrik Jacobus Prins
Reaction type	Coupling reaction

Identifiers
Organic Chemistry Portal	prins-reaction
RSC ontology ID	RXNO:0000048

The Prins reaction is an organic reaction consisting of an electrophilic addition of an aldehyde or ketone to an alkene or alkyne followed by capture of a nucleophile or elimination of an H^{+} ion. The outcome of the reaction depends on reaction conditions. With water and a protic acid such as sulfuric acid as the reaction medium and formaldehyde the reaction product is a 1,3-diol (3). When water is absent, the cationic intermediate loses a proton to give an allylic alcohol (4). With an excess of formaldehyde and a low reaction temperature the reaction product is a dioxane (5). When water is replaced by acetic acid the corresponding esters are formed.

Scheme 1. The Prins reaction

== History ==
The original reactants employed by Dutch chemist Hendrik Jacobus Prins in his 1919 publication were styrene (scheme 2), pinene, camphene, eugenol, isosafrole and anethole. These procedures have been optimized.

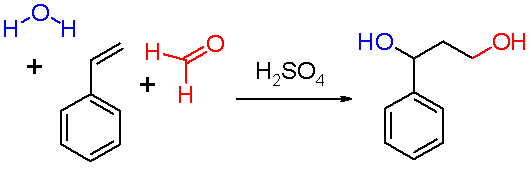
Scheme 2. The Prins reaction with styrene

Hendrik Jacobus Prins discovered two new organic reactions during his doctoral research in the year of 1911–1912. The first one is the addition of polyhalogen compound to olefins and the second reaction is the acid catalyzed addition of aldehydes to olefin compounds. The early studies on Prins reaction are exploratory in nature and did not attract much attention until 1937. The development of petroleum cracking in 1937 increased the production of unsaturated hydrocarbons. As a consequence, commercial availability of lower olefin coupled with an aldehyde produced from oxidation of low boiling paraffin increased the curiosity to study the olefin-aldehyde condensation. Later on, Prins reaction emerged as a powerful C-O and C-C bond forming technique in the synthesis of various molecules in organic synthesis.

In 1937 the reaction was investigated as part of a quest for di-olefins to be used in synthetic rubber.

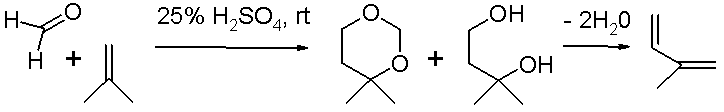
Scheme 3. Isoprene Prins reaction

== Reaction mechanism ==
The reaction mechanism for this reaction is depicted in scheme 5. The carbonyl reactant (2) is protonated by a protic acid and for the resulting oxonium ion 3 two resonance structures can be drawn. This electrophile engages in an electrophilic addition with the alkene to the carbocationic intermediate 4. Exactly how much positive charge is present on the secondary carbon atom in this intermediate should be determined for each reaction set. Evidence exists for neighbouring group participation of the hydroxyl oxygen or its neighboring carbon atom. When the overall reaction has a high degree of concertedness, the charge built-up will be modest.

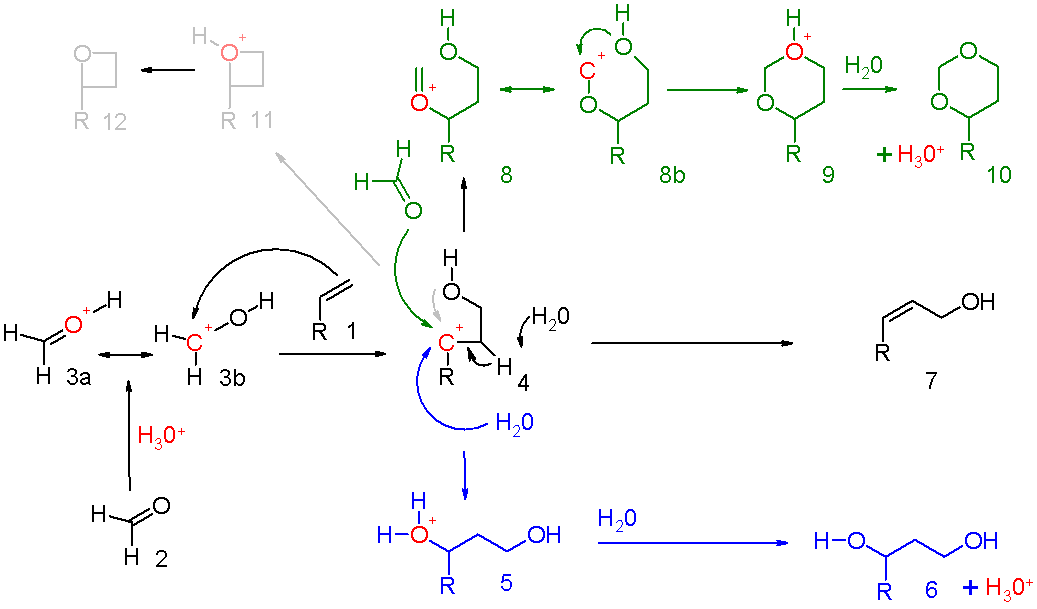
Scheme 5. Prins reaction mechanism

The three reaction modes open to this oxocarbenium intermediate are:

- in blue: capture of the carbocation by water or any suitable nucleophile through 5 to the 1,3-adduct 6.
- in black: proton abstraction in an elimination reaction to unsaturated compound 7. When the alkene carries a methylene group, elimination and addition can be concerted with transfer of an allyl proton to the carbonyl group which in effect is an ene reaction in scheme 6.

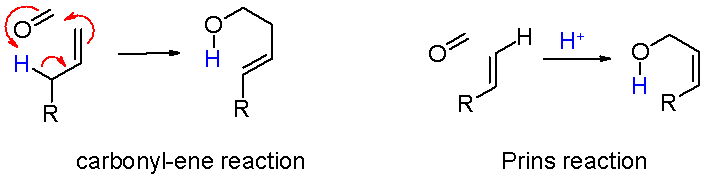
Scheme 6. Carbonyl-ene reaction versus Prins reaction

- in green: capture of the carbocation by additional carbonyl reactant. In this mode the positive charge is dispersed over oxygen and carbon in the resonance structures 8a and 8b. Ring closure leads through intermediate 9 to the dioxane 10. An example is the conversion of styrene to 4-phenyl-m-dioxane.
- in gray: only in specific reactions and when the carbocation is very stable the reaction takes a shortcut to the oxetane 12. The photochemical Paternò–Büchi reaction between alkenes and aldehydes to oxetanes is more straightforward.

== Variations ==
Many variations of the Prins reaction exist because it lends itself easily to cyclization reactions and because it is possible to capture the oxo-carbenium ion with a large array of nucleophiles. The halo-Prins reaction is one such modification with replacement of protic acids and water by lewis acids such as stannic chloride and boron tribromide. The halogen is now the nucleophile recombining with the carbocation. The cyclization of certain allyl pulegones in scheme 7 with titanium tetrachloride in dichloromethane at −78 °C gives access to the decalin skeleton with the hydroxyl group and chlorine group predominantly in cis configuration (91% cis). This observed cis diastereoselectivity is due to the intermediate formation of a trichlorotitanium alkoxide making possible an easy delivery of chlorine to the carbocation ion from the same face. The trans isomer is preferred (98% cis) when the switch is made to a tin tetrachloride reaction at room temperature.

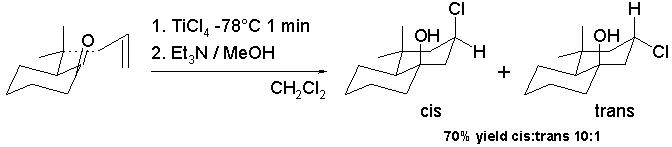
Scheme 7. Halo-Prins reaction

The Prins-pinacol reaction is a cascade reaction of a Prins reaction and a pinacol rearrangement. The carbonyl group in the reactant in scheme 8 is masked as a dimethyl acetal and the hydroxyl group is masked as a triisopropylsilyl ether (TIPS). With lewis acid stannic chloride the oxonium ion is activated and the pinacol rearrangement of the resulting Prins intermediate results in ring contraction and referral of the positive charge to the TIPS ether which eventually forms an aldehyde group in the final product as a mixture of cis and trans isomers with modest diastereoselectivity.

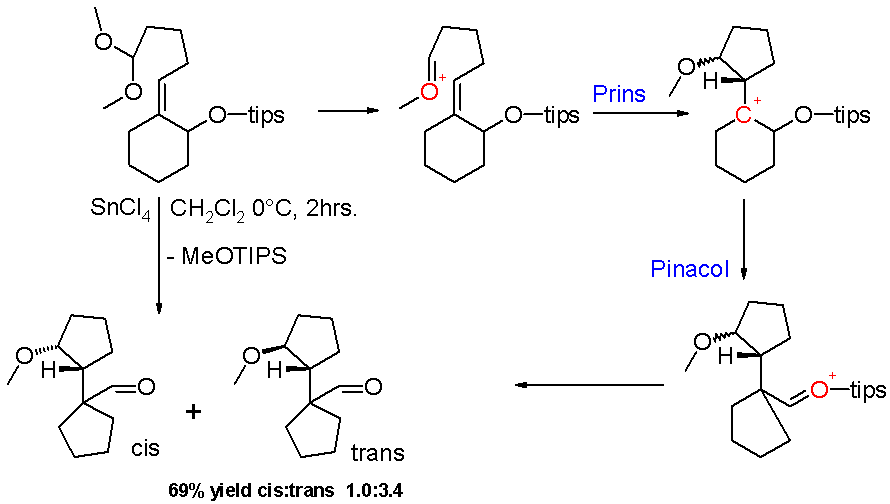
Scheme 8. Halo-Prins reaction

The key oxo-carbenium intermediate can be formed by other routes than simple protonation of a carbonyl. In a key step of the synthesis of exiguolide, it was formed by protonation of a vinylogous ester:

Prins reaction Kwon 2008

== See also ==
- Heteropoly acid
- Ene reaction
