= Phosphomolybdic acid =

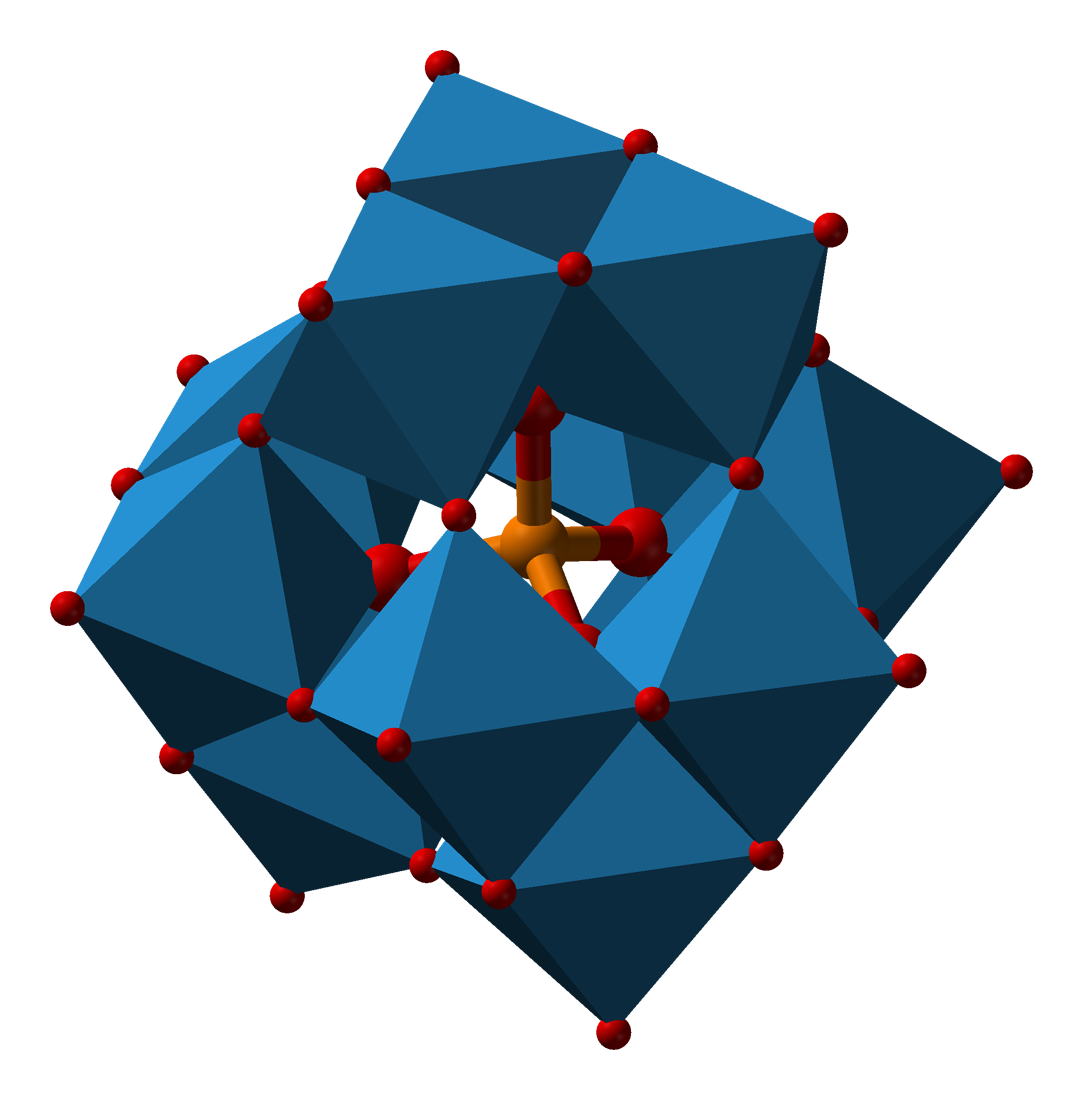

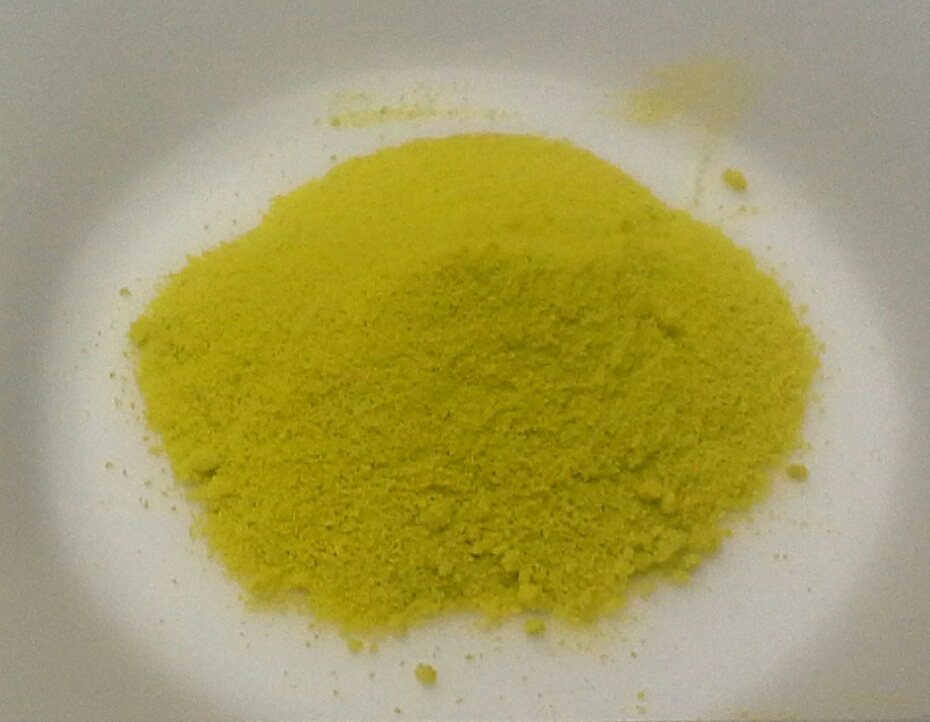

Names
- Other names Molybdophosphoric acid; dodecamolybdophosphoric acid

Identifiers
CAS Number	12026-57-2 (anhydrous); 51429-74-4 (hydrate)
3D model (JSmol)	Interactive image; Interactive image
ChemSpider	9426978
ECHA InfoCard	100.031.544
EC Number	234-713-5
MeSH	Phosphomolybdic+acid
PubChem CID	11251951
UNII	RN225F04V1
- InChI: InChI=1S/12Mo.H3O4P.36O/c;;;;;;;;;;;;1-5(2,3)4;;;;;;;;;;;;;;;;;;;;;;;;;;;;;;;;;;;;/h;;;;;;;;;;;;(H3,1,2,3,4);;;;;;;;;;;;;;;;;;;;;;;;;;;;;;;;;;;; Key: DHRLEVQXOMLTIM-UHFFFAOYSA-N
- SMILES: OP(=O)(O)O.O=[Mo](=O)=O.O=[Mo](=O)=O.O=[Mo](=O)=O.O=[Mo](=O)=O.O=[Mo](=O)=O.O=[Mo](=O)=O.O=[Mo](=O)=O.O=[Mo](=O)=O.O=[Mo](=O)=O.O=[Mo](=O)=O.O=[Mo](=O)=O.O=[Mo](=O)=O; [Mo]18%21%24(O[Mo]%16%18%23(O[Mo]56(O1)(O[Mo]247(O[Mo]9%22(O[Mo]%12%13(O2)(O[Mo]3%11%14(O[Mo]%17%19(O[Mo](O3)(O4)(O5)([O++]67[P+]%15%20[O++]89[Mo]%10(O[Mo](O[Mo](O%10)(O%11)(O%12)([O++]%13%14%15)[O-])(O%16)(O%17)([O++]%18%19%20)[O-])(O%21)(O%22)[O-])[O-])(O%23)[O-])[O-])O)(O%24)[O-])[O-])O)[O-])O

Properties
Chemical formula	H_{3}[PMo_{12}O_{40}]
Molar mass	1825.25 g/mol
Density	1.62 g/ml (hydrate)
Melting point	79-90 °C
Solubility in water	soluble

Hazards
- Occupational safety and health (OHS/OSH)
Main hazards	Oxidiser (hydrate)
- Except where otherwise noted, data are given for materials in their standard state (at 25 °C [77 °F], 100 kPa). verify (what is ?) Infobox references

Phosphomolybdic acid is the heteropolymetalate with the formula H_{3}[Mo_{12}PO_{40}]·12H_{2}O. It is a yellow solid, although even slightly impure samples have a greenish coloration. It is also known as dodeca molybdophosphoric acid or PMA, is a yellow-green chemical compound that is freely soluble in water and polar organic solvents such as ethanol. It is used as a stain in histology and in organic synthesis.

== Histology ==
Phosphomolybdic acid is a component of Masson's trichrome stain.

== Organic synthesis ==
Phosphomolybdic is used as a stain for developing thin-layer chromatography plates, staining phenolics, hydrocarbon waxes, alkaloids, and steroids. Conjugated unsaturated compounds reduce PMA to molybdenum blue. The color intensifies with increasing number of double bonds in the molecule being stained.

Phosphomolybdic acid is also occasionally used in acid-catalyzed reactions in organic synthesis. It has been shown to be a good catalyst for the Skraup reaction for the synthesis of substituted quinolines.

Bismuth phosphomolybdate catalyzes ammoxidation in the Sohio process.

== See also ==
- Phosphotungstic acid
- Folin-Ciocalteu reagent
