= Szenicsite =

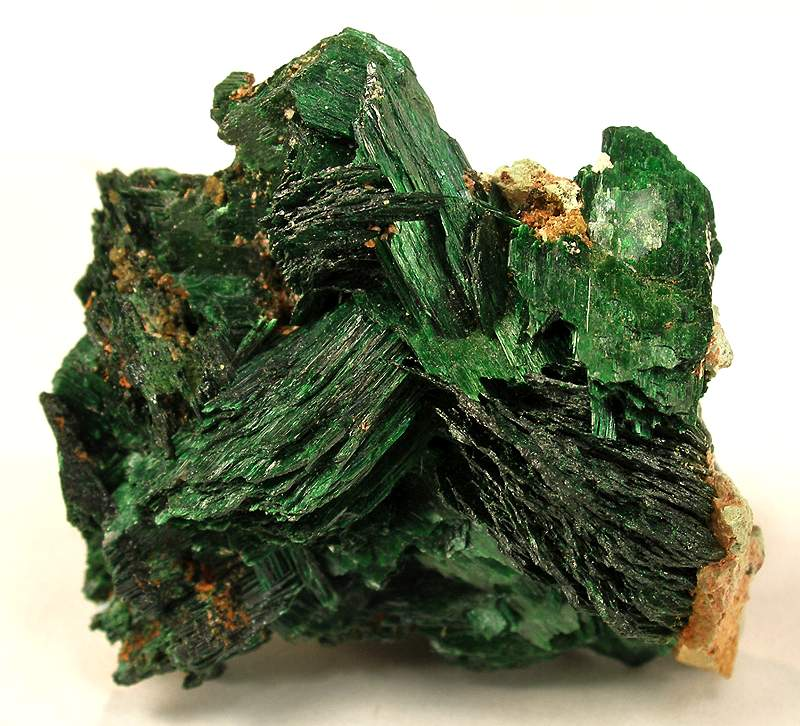

General
- Category: Minerals
- Formula: Cu_{3}(MoO_{4})(OH)_{4}
- IMA symbol: Sze
- Strunz classification: 7.GB.10
- Dana classification: 48.3.5.1
- Crystal system: Orthorhombic
- Crystal class: Dipyramidal; H-M symbol: mmm
- Space group: Pnnm
- Unit cell: 649.79

Identification
- Color: Dark green
- Cleavage: Good on {100} and {010}
- Tenacity: Brittle
- Mohs scale hardness: 3.5 - 4
- Luster: Adamantine, Pearly
- Streak: Green
- Diaphaneity: Transparent, Translucent
- Specific gravity: 4.26
- Density: Measured: 4.26(5); Calculated: 4.279
- Optical properties: Biaxial (+)
- Refractive index: n_{α} = 1.886 n_{β} = 1.892 n_{γ} = 1.903
- Birefringence: 0.017
- Pleochroism: Visible X = Yellow-green; Y = Z = Green
- 2V angle: 74°
- Dispersion: Strong r > v

Szenicsite is a copper hydroxy molybdate mineral, named after husband and wife Terry and Marissa Szenics, American mineral collectors who found the first specimens. When it was first discovered in Atacama, Chile, it was thought to be lindgrenite. The occurrence appeared in an isolated area, which was about one cubic meter in size. The mineral occurred in cavities of copper bearing powellite and matrix rich molybdenite. These cavities were filled with a material resembling clay. Outside of the zone the szenicsite crystals grew, copper levels seemed to decrease, and the mineralization changed to lindgrenite. Moving further from the zone, the minerals growing seemed to be lacking copper, and consisted of powellite blebs in the ore. Szenicsite was approved by the IMA in 1993.

== Properties ==
Szenicsite is a dimorph of markascherite. This mineral is pleochroic, which is an optical phenomenon, meaning that depending on the axis it is being inspected on, it changes colors. When viewed on the X axis, the mineral can be seen as yellow-green, while if inspected on the Y and Z axes, it appears green. Szenicsite consists of copper (45.54%), oxygen (22.92%), molybdenum (22.92%), and further has a negligible, 0.96% hydrogen in its composition. This mineral grows bladed radial crystals. These crystals are thin and lath-like, and form aggregates. They grow from a central point, without creating stellar shapes. Szenicsite does not show any radioactive properties. During an experiment carried out by four Russian mineralogists, it was found out that when heated up to above 350°C, szenicsite decomposes to cupromolybdite and tenorite according to the reaction: 2Cu_{3}(MoO_{4})(OH)_{4} → Cu_{3}O(MoO_{4})_{2} + 3CuO + 2H_{2}↑.

== Occurrences and localities ==
Szenicsite is an uncommon secondary mineral that grows in the oxidized zone. Szenicsite is a type locality at the Jardinera No. 1 Mine, at Chile. By error, the type locality was previously given as "Tierra Amarilla". The mineral is associated with baryte, brochantite, chalcocite, chalcopyrite, chrysocolla, gold, hematite, lindgrenite, molybdenite, powellite and quartz.
