= Group 6 element =

Group of chemical elements

Group 6 in the periodic table
Hydrogen																															Helium
Lithium	Beryllium																									Boron	Carbon	Nitrogen	Oxygen	Fluorine	Neon
Sodium	Magnesium																									Aluminium	Silicon	Phosphorus	Sulfur	Chlorine	Argon
Potassium	Calcium															Scandium	Titanium	Vanadium	Chromium	Manganese	Iron	Cobalt	Nickel	Copper	Zinc	Gallium	Germanium	Arsenic	Selenium	Bromine	Krypton
Rubidium	Strontium															Yttrium	Zirconium	Niobium	Molybdenum	Technetium	Ruthenium	Rhodium	Palladium	Silver	Cadmium	Indium	Tin	Antimony	Tellurium	Iodine	Xenon
Caesium	Barium	Lanthanum	Cerium	Praseodymium	Neodymium	Promethium	Samarium	Europium	Gadolinium	Terbium	Dysprosium	Holmium	Erbium	Thulium	Ytterbium	Lutetium	Hafnium	Tantalum	Tungsten	Rhenium	Osmium	Iridium	Platinum	Gold	Mercury (element)	Thallium	Lead	Bismuth	Polonium	Astatine	Radon
Francium	Radium	Actinium	Thorium	Protactinium	Uranium	Neptunium	Plutonium	Americium	Curium	Berkelium	Californium	Einsteinium	Fermium	Mendelevium	Nobelium	Lawrencium	Rutherfordium	Dubnium	Seaborgium	Bohrium	Hassium	Meitnerium	Darmstadtium	Roentgenium	Copernicium	Nihonium	Flerovium	Moscovium	Livermorium	Tennessine	Oganesson
group 5 ← → group 7
IUPAC group number	6
Name by element	chromium group
CAS group number (US, pattern A-B-A)	VIB
old IUPAC number (Europe, pattern A-B)	VIA

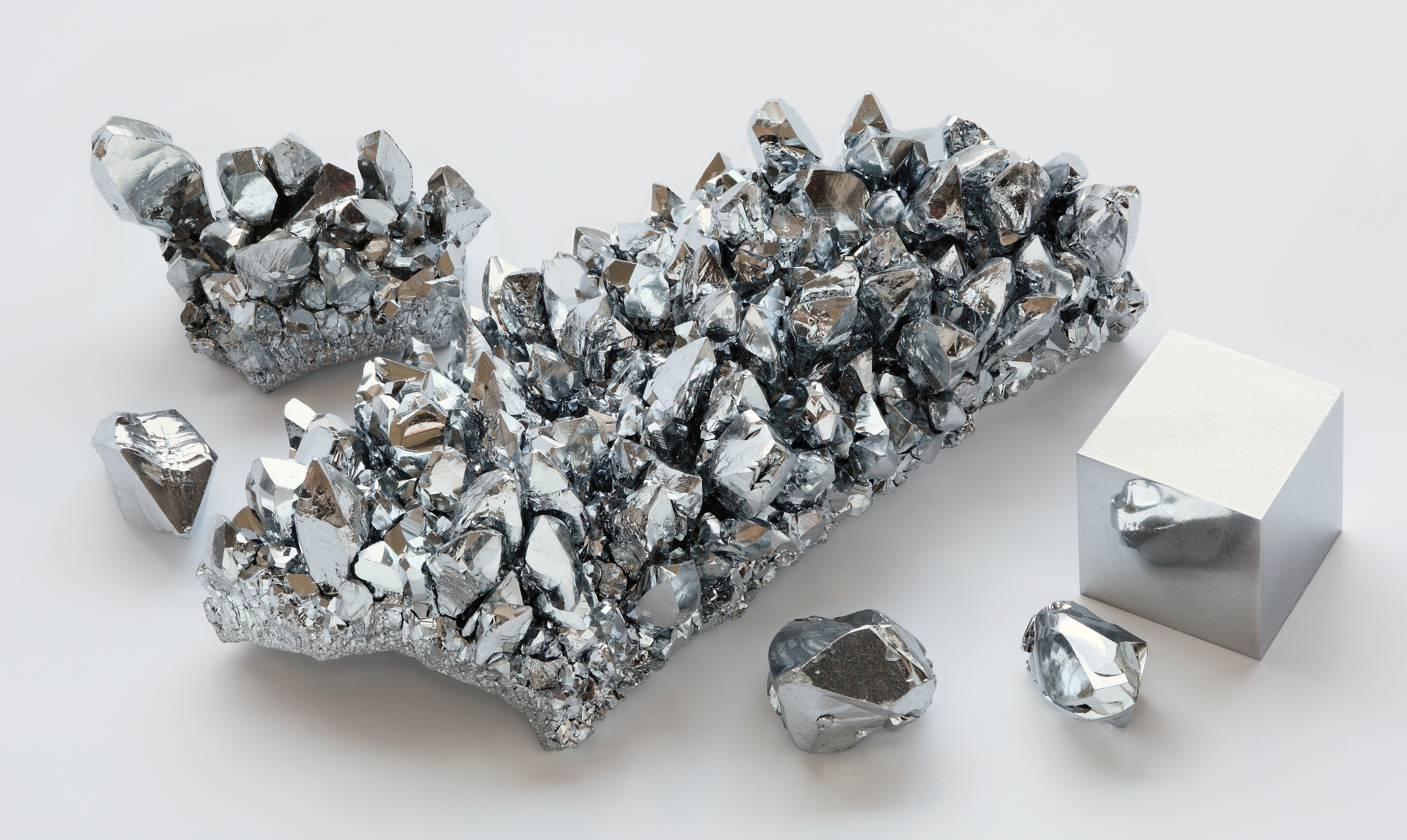
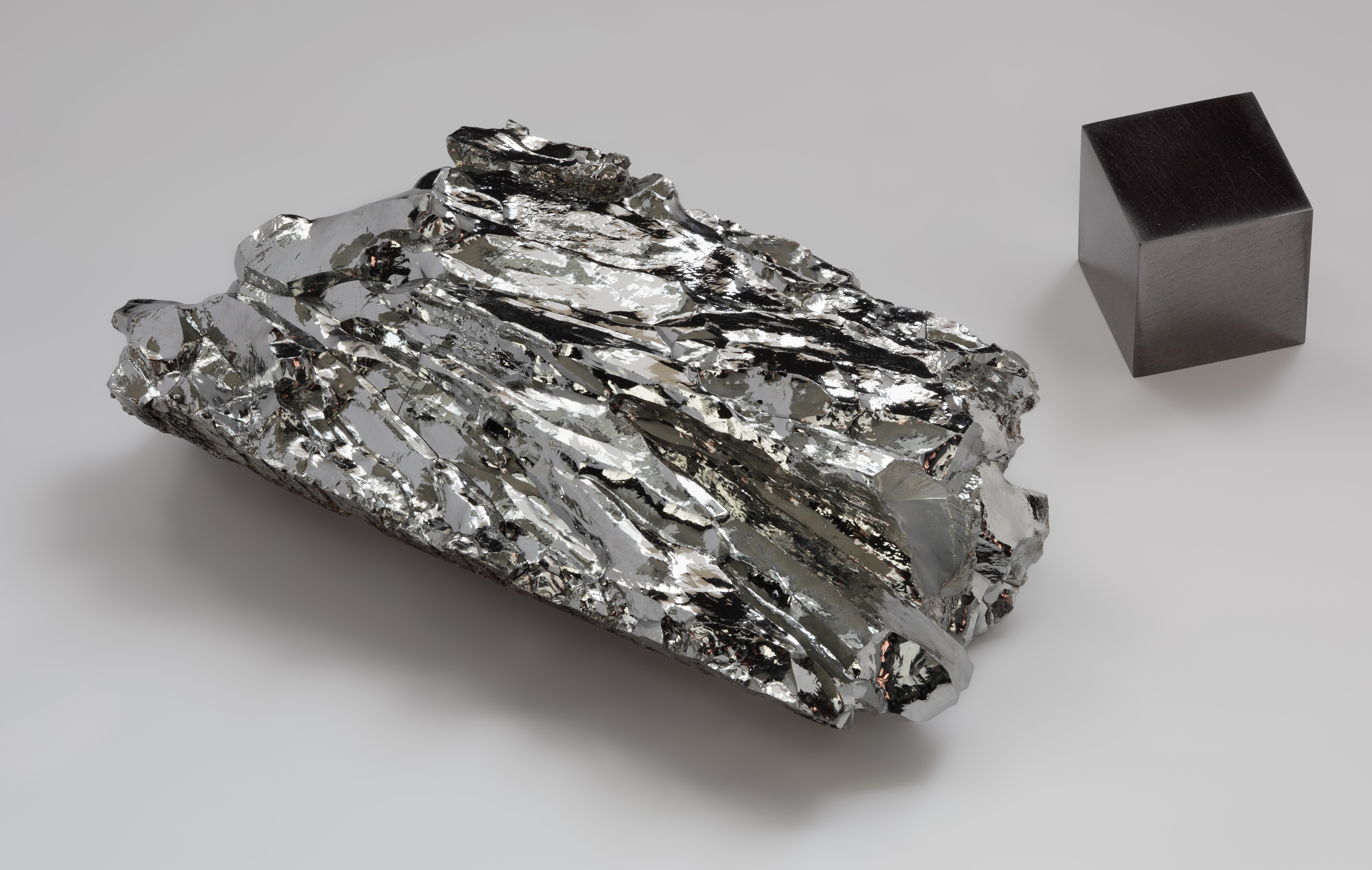
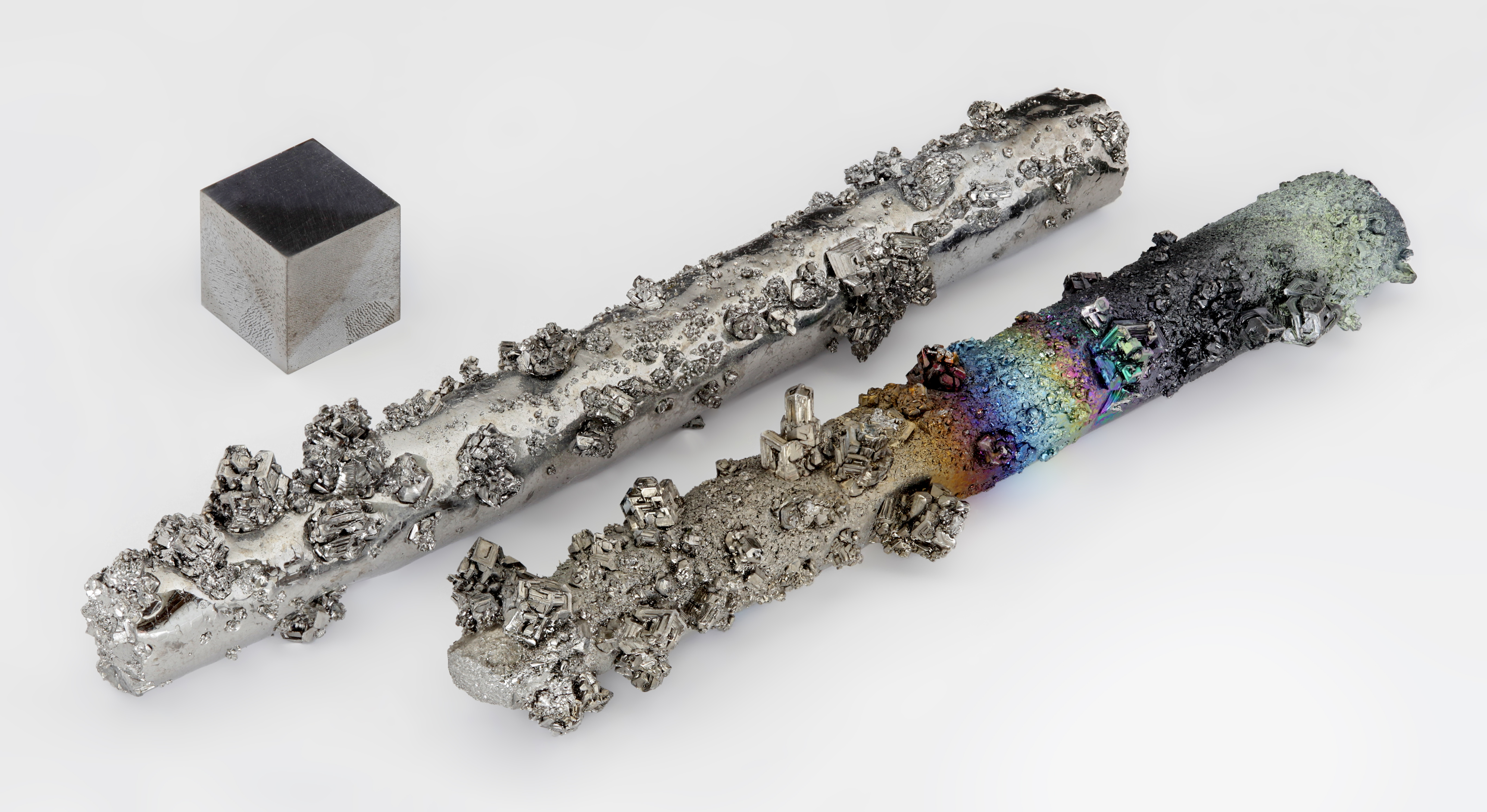
↓ Period
4	Chromium (Cr); 24 Transition metal
5	Molybdenum (Mo); 42 Transition metal
6	Tungsten (W); 74 Transition metal
7	Seaborgium (Sg); 106 Transition metal
Legend primordial element synthetic element

Group 6, numbered by IUPAC style, is a group of elements in the periodic table. Its members are chromium (Cr), molybdenum (Mo), tungsten (W), and seaborgium (Sg). These are all transition metals and chromium, molybdenum and tungsten are refractory metals.

The electron configuration of these elements do not follow a unified trend, though the outermost shells do correlate with trends in chemical behavior:

Z	Element	Electrons per shell
24	chromium	2, 8, 13, 1
42	molybdenum	2, 8, 18, 13, 1
74	tungsten	2, 8, 18, 32, 12, 2
106	seaborgium	2, 8, 18, 32, 32, 12, 2

"Group 6" is the new IUPAC name for this group; the old style name was "group VIB" in the old US system (CAS) or "group VIA" in the European system (old IUPAC). Group 6 must not be confused with the group with the old-style group crossed names of either VIA (US system, CAS) or VIB (European system, old IUPAC). That group is now called group 16.

== History ==
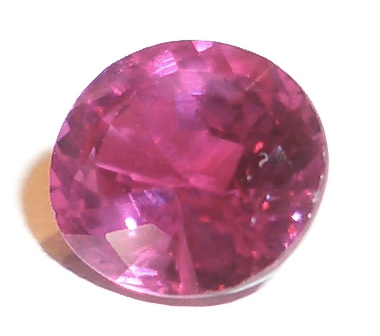
The red colour of rubies is from a small amount of chromium(III).

=== Discoveries ===
Chromium was first reported on July 26, 1761, when Johann Gottlob Lehmann found an orange-red mineral in the Beryozovskoye mines in the Ural Mountains of Russia, which he named "Siberian red lead," which was found out in less than 10 years to be a bright yellow pigment. Though misidentified as a lead compound with selenium and iron components, the mineral was crocoite with a formula of PbCrO_{4}. Studying the mineral in 1797, Louis Nicolas Vauquelin produced chromium trioxide by mixing crocoite with hydrochloric acid, and metallic chromium by heating the oxide in a charcoal oven a year later. He was also able to detect traces of chromium in precious gemstones, such as ruby or emerald.

Molybdenite—the principal ore from which molybdenum is now extracted—was previously known as molybdena, which was confused with and often implemented as though it were graphite. Like graphite, molybdenite can be used to blacken a surface or as a solid lubricant. Even when molybdena was distinguishable from graphite, it was still confused with a galena (a common lead ore), which took its name from Ancient Greek Μόλυβδος molybdos, meaning lead. It was not until 1778 that Swedish chemist Carl Wilhelm Scheele realized that molybdena was neither graphite nor lead. He and other chemists then correctly assumed that it was the ore of a distinct new element, named molybdenum for the mineral in which it was discovered. Peter Jacob Hjelm successfully isolated molybdenum by using carbon and linseed oil in 1781.

Regarding tungsten, in 1781 Carl Wilhelm Scheele discovered that a new acid, tungstic acid, could be made from scheelite (at the time named tungsten). Scheele and Torbern Bergman suggested that it might be possible to obtain a new metal by reducing this acid. In 1783, José and Fausto Elhuyar found an acid made from wolframite that was identical to tungstic acid. Later that year, in Spain, the brothers succeeded in isolating tungsten by reduction of this acid with charcoal, and they are credited with the discovery of the element.

Seaborgium was first produced by a team of scientists led by Albert Ghiorso who worked at the Lawrence Berkeley Laboratory in Berkeley, California, in 1974. They created seaborgium by bombarding atoms of californium-249 with ions of oxygen-18 until seaborgium-263 was produced.

=== Historical development and uses ===
During the 1800s, chromium was primarily used as a component of paints and in tanning salts. At first, crocoite from Russia was the main source, but in 1827, a larger chromite deposit was discovered near Baltimore, United States. This made the United States the largest producer of chromium products until 1848 when large deposits of chromite where found near Bursa, Turkey. Chromium was used for electroplating as early as 1848, but this use only became widespread with the development of an improved process in 1924.

For about a century after its isolation, molybdenum had no industrial use, owing to its relative scarcity, difficulty extracting the pure metal, and the immaturity of the metallurgical subfield. Early molybdenum steel alloys showed great promise in their increased hardness, but efforts were hampered by inconsistent results and a tendency toward brittleness and recrystallization. In 1906, William D. Coolidge filed a patent for rendering molybdenum ductile, leading to its use as a heating element for high-temperature furnaces and as a support for tungsten-filament light bulbs; oxide formation and degradation require that moly be physically sealed or held in an inert gas. In 1913, Frank E. Elmore developed a flotation process to recover molybdenite from ores; flotation remains the primary isolation process. During the first World War, demand for molybdenum spiked; it was used both in armor plating and as a substitute for tungsten in high-speed steels. Some British tanks were protected by 75 mm (3 in) manganese steel plating, but this proved to be ineffective. The manganese steel plates were replaced with 25 mm (1 in) molybdenum-steel plating allowing for higher speed, greater maneuverability, and better protection. After the war, demand plummeted until metallurgical advances allowed extensive development of peacetime applications. In World War II, molybdenum again saw strategic importance as a substitute for tungsten in steel alloys.

In World War II, tungsten played a significant role in background political dealings. Portugal, as the main European source of the element, was put under pressure from both sides, because of its deposits of wolframite ore at Panasqueira. Tungsten's resistance to high temperatures and its strengthening of alloys made it an important raw material for the arms industry.

== Chemistry ==
Unlike other groups, the members of this family do not show patterns in its electron configuration, as two lighter members of the group are exceptions from the Aufbau principle:

Z	Element	Numerical Bohr model
24	chromium	2, 8, 13, 1
42	molybdenum	2, 8, 18, 13, 1
74	tungsten	2, 8, 18, 32, 12, 2
106	seaborgium	2, 8, 18, 32, 32, 12, 2

Most of the chemistry has been observed only for the first three members of the group. The chemistry of seaborgium is not very established and therefore the rest of the section deals only with its upper neighbors in the periodic table. The elements in the group, like those of groups 7–11, have high melting points, and form volatile compounds in higher oxidation states. All the elements of the group are relatively nonreactive metals with a high melting points (1907 °C, 2477 °C, 3422 °C); that of tungsten is the highest of all metals. The metals form compounds in different oxidation states: chromium forms compounds in all states from −2 to +6: disodium pentacarbonylchromate, disodium decacarbonyldichromate, bis(benzene)chromium, tripotassium pentanitrocyanochromate, chromium(II) chloride, chromium(III) oxide, chromium(IV) chloride, potassium tetraperoxochromate(V), and chromium(VI) dichloride dioxide; the same is also true for molybdenum and tungsten, but the stability of the +6 state grows down the group. Depending on oxidation states, the compounds are basic, amphoteric, or acidic; the acidity grows with the oxidation state of the metal.

== Occurrence and production ==
=== Chromium ===
Chromium is a very common naturally occurring element. It is the 21st most abundant element in the Earth's crust with an average concentration of 100 ppm. The most common oxidation states for chromium are zero, trivalent, and hexavalent states. Most naturally occurring chromium is in the hexavalent state. About two-fifths of the worlds chromium are produced in South Africa, with Kazakhstan, India, Russia, and Turkey following. Chromium is mined as chromite ore.

The two main products of chromium refinement are ferrochromium and chromium metal. Ferrochromium is obtained by reducing chromite ore with either aluminium or silicon at high temperatures. For chromium metal, the iron must be separated first using a two-step roasting and leaching process. By heating with sodium and calcium carbonates in air, the chromium is oxidised to its hexavalent form, while the iron forms stable Fe_{2}O_{3}. The insoluble iron oxide is removed in the subsequent leaching process, and the resulting chromium can be isolated by reaction with sulfuric acid (to form the dichromate), reduction with carbon (to form Cr_{2}O_{3}), and finally reduction with aluminium.

=== Molybdenum ===
Molybdenum is the 54th most abundant element in the Earth's crust, and 42nd most abundant in the Universe. It is refined mainly from molybdenite, but is also present in wulfenite (PbMoO_{4}) and powellite (CaMoO_{4}). It is both mined as a principal ore and is also recovered as a byproduct of copper and tungsten mining. It is mainly mined in the United States, China, Chile, and Peru, with the total amount produced being 200,000 tonnes per year.

The processing of molybdenite involves roasting in air at 700 °C to produce MoO_{3}, which is then usually extracted with aqueous ammonia to give ammonium molybdate. Copper impurities are then removed by treatment with hydrogen sulfide. Ammonium molybdate converts to ammonium dimolybdate, which is isolated as a solid and heated to produce molybdenum trioxide. Reduction of this oxide with hydrogen affords molybdenum metal.

=== Tungsten ===
Tungsten is slightly more abundant in the Earth's crust than molybdenum, with an average concentration of 1.25 ppm. It is mainly found in the minerals wolframite and scheelite, and it usually never occurs as a free element in nature. The largest producers of tungsten in the world are China (1,800,000 t), Canada (290,000 t), Russia (160,000 t), Vietnam (95,000 t) and Bolivia.

Tungsten is extracted from its ore through a multi-step process, resulting in WO_{3}. This is then reduced with hydrogen or carbon to produce powdered tungsten. Due to tungsten's very high melting point, it is often sintered with another metal, such as nickel, to produce an alloy with a lower melting point.

=== Seaborgium ===
Seaborgium is a synthetic transuranium element that does not occur in nature. The seaborgium-260 isotope can be made by bombarding lead-207 or -208 with chromium-54 nuclei; seaborgium-263 by bombarding californium-249 with oxygen-18 nuclei; and seaborgium-267 by bombarding hassium-271 with α-particles, among others.

== Precautions ==
While trivalent chromium compounds and chromium metal are insoluble, and are not considered a health hazard, hexavalent chromium compounds are genotoxic carcinogens. The acute oral toxicity of hexavalent chromium is 1.5-3.3 mg/kg, as it enters cells through similar transport mechanisms as sulfate and phosphate. Its strong oxidizing capability causes damage to the kidneys, liver, and red blood cells, resulting in liver and renal failure and hemolysis. Chromate salts can also cause allergic reactions, leading to contact dermatitis, irritant dermatitis, and ulceration, sometimes known as "chrome ulcers".

Molybdenum is an essential element in most organisms, and an essential trace dietary element in humans. However, long-term exposure to molybdenum dust and fumes can be toxic, causing irritation to the eyes and skin at low levels and fatigue, headaches, and joint pain at high levels.

The risk of tungsten dust, particulates, and alloys in cancer and other adverse effects has been highlighted in vitro and in vivo, though varies greatly depending on the animal and method of administration. The National Institute for Occupational Safety and Health (NIOSH) has set a recommended exposure limit (REL) of 5 mg/m^{3} over an 8-hour workday and a short term limit of 10 mg/m^{3}.

Seaborgium is a radioactive synthetic element that is not found in nature; the most stable known isotope has a half-life of approximately 14 minutes.

== Applications ==
- Alloys
- Catalysts
- High temperature and refractory applications, such as welding electrodes and kiln components.
- Metallurgy, sometimes used in jet engines and gas turbines.
- Dyes and pigments
- Tanning
- hard materials

== Biological occurrences ==
Group 6 is notable in that it contains some of the only elements in periods 5 and 6 with a known role in the biological chemistry of living organisms: molybdenum is common in enzymes of many organisms including humans, and tungsten has been identified in an analogous role in enzymes from some archaea, such as Pyrococcus furiosus. In contrast, and unusually for a first-row d-block transition metal, chromium appears to have few biological roles, although it is thought to form part of the glucose metabolism enzyme in some mammals.
