= Lindgrenite =

Copper molybdate mineral

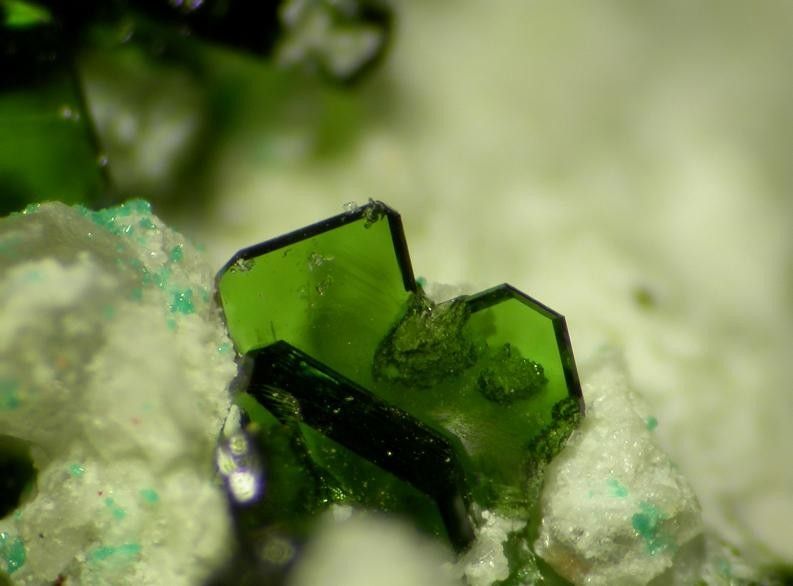
- Lindgrenite specimen from the San Samuel Mine of the Cachiyuyo de Llampos district, Copiapó Province, Atacama Region, Chile (field of view 4 mm)

General
- Category: Molybdate mineral
- Formula: Cu_{3}(MoO_{4})_{2}(OH)_{2}
- IMA symbol: Lgr
- Strunz classification: 7.GB.05
- Dana classification: 48.3.1.1
- Crystal system: Monoclinic
- Crystal class: Prismatic (2/m) (same H-M symbol)
- Space group: P2_{1}/n
- Unit cell: a = 5.394, b = 14.023 c = 5.608 [Å]; β = 98.5°; Z = 2

Identification
- Color: Green to yellowish green
- Crystal habit: Tabular to platey crystals, may be acicular, massive or crust forming
- Cleavage: Perfect on {010} and {101}, poor on {100}
- Fracture: Micaceous
- Tenacity: Brittle
- Mohs scale hardness: 4.5
- Luster: Greasey
- Streak: Pale green
- Diaphaneity: Transparent
- Specific gravity: 4.2
- Optical properties: Biaxial (-)
- Refractive index: n_{α} = 1.930 n_{β} = 2.002 n_{γ} = 2.020
- Birefringence: δ = 0.090
- 2V angle: 71° (measured)

Lindgrenite is an uncommon copper molybdate mineral with formula: Cu_{3}(MoO_{4})_{2}(OH)_{2}. It occurs as tabular to platey monoclinic green to yellow green crystals.

== Discovery and occurrence ==
It was first described in 1935 for an occurrence in the Chuquicamata Mine, Antofagasta, Chile, and named for Swedish–American economic geologist Waldemar Lindgren (1860–1939) of the Massachusetts Institute of Technology.

Lindgrenite occurs in the oxidized portions of copper–molybdenum bearing sulfide ore deposits. Associated minerals include antlerite, molybdenite, powellite, brochantite, chrysocolla, iron oxides and quartz.

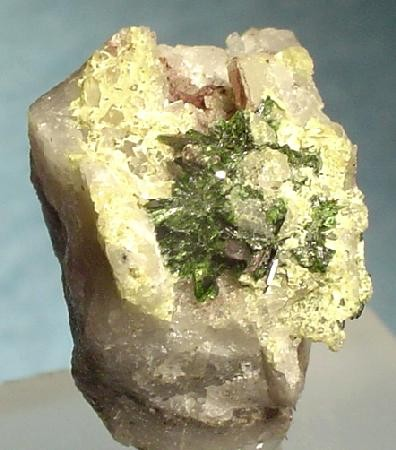
Lindgrenite in a quartz vug from the type locality of Chuquicamata (size: 1.7 x 1.7 x 1.4 cm)

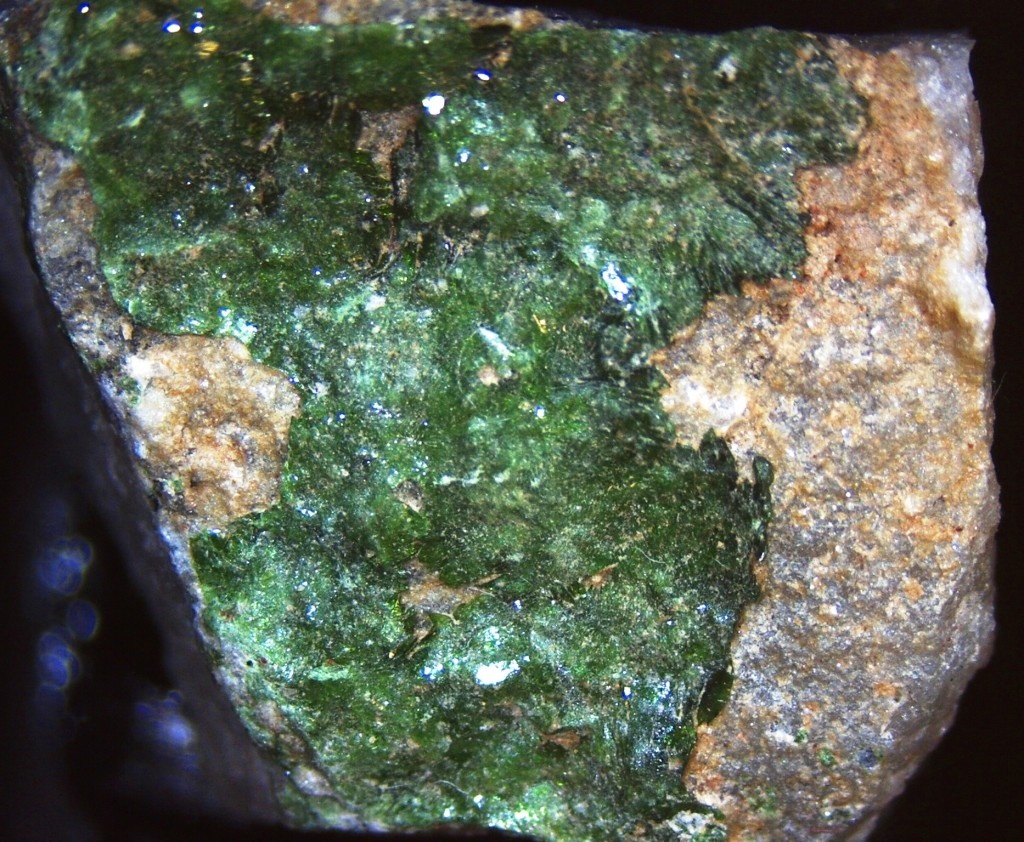
Lindgrenite, Inspiration mine, Arizona. Size 2 cm.
