= Silver molybdate =

Identifiers
CAS Number	13765-74-7
3D model (JSmol)	Interactive image
ChemSpider	10801079
ECHA InfoCard	100.033.962
PubChem CID	16217378
CompTox Dashboard (EPA)	DTXSID20894908
- InChI: InChI=1S/2Ag.Mo.4O/q2*+1;;;;2*-1 Key: MHLYOTJKDAAHGI-UHFFFAOYSA-N; InChI=1/2Ag.Mo.4O/q2*+1;;;;2*-1/r2Ag.MoO4/c;;2-1(3,4)5/q2*+1;-2 Key: ^@€×,&#+=+÷×¥× ndnzjsnssi-QWQXGURBAC
- SMILES: [Ag+].[Ag+].[O-][Mo]([O-])(=O)=O

Properties
Chemical formula	Ag_{2}MoO_{4}
Molar mass	375.67 g/mol
Appearance	yellow crystals
Density	6.18 g/cm^{3}, solid
Melting point	483 °C (901 °F; 756 K)
Solubility in water	slightly soluble

Structure
Crystal structure	cubic

Related compounds
Related compounds	Silver decamolybdate
- Except where otherwise noted, data are given for materials in their standard state (at 25 °C [77 °F], 100 kPa). verify (what is ?) Infobox references

Silver molybdate is an inorganic compound with the chemical formula Ag_{2}MoO_{4}. It is a yellow solid that crystallizes in the cubic system and exhibits dimorphism. It is often used in glass.

== Structure ==
Silver molybdate crystals present two types of electronic structure, depending on the pressure conditions to which the crystal is subjected. At room temperature, it exhibits a spinel-type cubic structure, known as β-Ag_{2}MoO_{4}, which is more stable in nature. However, when exposed to high hydrostatic pressure, the tetragonal α-Ag_{2}MoO_{4} forms as a metastable phase.

== Synthesis and properties ==
=== α-Ag2MoO4 ===
α-Ag_{2}MoO_{4} can be prepared by solution-phase precipitation under ambient conditions, using 3-bis(2-pyridyl)pyrazine (dpp) as a doping agent. The pH of the starting solution influences the growth and formation processes of distinct heterostructures (brooms, flowers and rods).

=== β-Ag2MoO4 ===
β-Ag_{2}MoO_{4} crystals can be prepared by solid-state reaction or oxide mixture at high temperature, melt-quenching, and Czochralski growth.

Additional methods include co-precipitation, microwave-assisted hydrothermal synthesis, a dynamic template route using polymerization of acrylamide assisted templates, and an impregnation/calcination method.

β-Ag_{2}MoO_{4} microcrystals can be synthesized by precipitation employing polar solvents.

Photocatalytic properties of β–Ag_{2}MoO_{4} crystals can be improved through hydrothermal processing at different temperatures. The replacement of Ag atoms with Zn to form silver-zinc molybdate [β–(Ag_{2−2x}Znx)MoO_{4}] microcrystals by a sonochemical method also leads to improvements. These crystals are able to degrade rhodamine B and Remazol Brilliant Violet 5R.

=== Ag-Ag2MoO4 composites ===
Ag-Ag_{2}MoO_{4} composites can be prepared by microwave-assisted hydrothermal synthesis. These composites present photocatalytic activity for the degradation of rhodamine B under visible light.

=== Other properties ===
Ag_{2}MoO_{4} mixed with graphite acts as a good lubricant for Ni-based composites, improving the tribological properties of the system.
