= Silver dichromate =

Names
- IUPAC name Silver dichromate

Identifiers
CAS Number	7784-02-3
3D model (JSmol)	Interactive image
ChemSpider	8108122
ECHA InfoCard	100.029.131
EC Number	232-044-3
PubChem CID	9932493
UNII	S8F2648XD9
CompTox Dashboard (EPA)	DTXSID80228462
- InChI: InChI=1S/2Cr.2Ag.7O/q;;2*+1;;;;;;2*-1; InChI=1/2Cr.2Ag.7O/q;;2*+1;;;;;;2*-1/rCr2O7.2Ag/c3-1(4,5)9-2(6,7)8;;/q-2;2*+1
- SMILES: [Ag+].[Ag+].[O-][Cr](=O)(=O)O[Cr]([O-])(=O)=O

Properties
Chemical formula	Ag_{2}Cr_{2}O_{7}
Molar mass	431.76 g/mol
Appearance	ruby red powder
Density	4.77 g/cm^{3}
Solubility in water	K_{sp} = 2.0×10^{−7}
- Except where otherwise noted, data are given for materials in their standard state (at 25 °C [77 °F], 100 kPa). Infobox references

Silver dichromate is a chemical compound with the formula Ag_{2}Cr_{2}O_{7}. It is insoluble in water and decomposes when treated with hot water. Its anion has a charge of -2.

== Synthesis ==
Silver dichromate can be precipitated by reacting potassium dichromate with silver nitrate:

K_{2}Cr_{2}O_{7} + 2 AgNO_{3} → Ag_{2}Cr_{2}O_{7} + 2 KNO_{3}

Nanostructures can be produced via a sonochemical method using silver salicylate and ammonium dichromate as precursors.

== Applications ==
Related complexes are used as oxidants in organic chemistry. For instance, tetrakis(pyridine)silver dichromate, [Ag_{2}(py)_{4}]^{2+}[Cr_{2}O_{7}]^{2−}, is used to convert benzylic and allylic alcohols to corresponding carbonyl compounds.

Dichromate solutions containing silver ions have been investigated for use in dosimetry.

== General references ==
- Greenwood, Norman N.; Earnshaw, Alan (1997). Chemistry of the Elements (2nd ed.). Butterworth-Heinemann. doi:10.1016/C2009-0-30414-6. ISBN 978-0-08-037941-8.
