= Ferrimolybdite =

Mineral

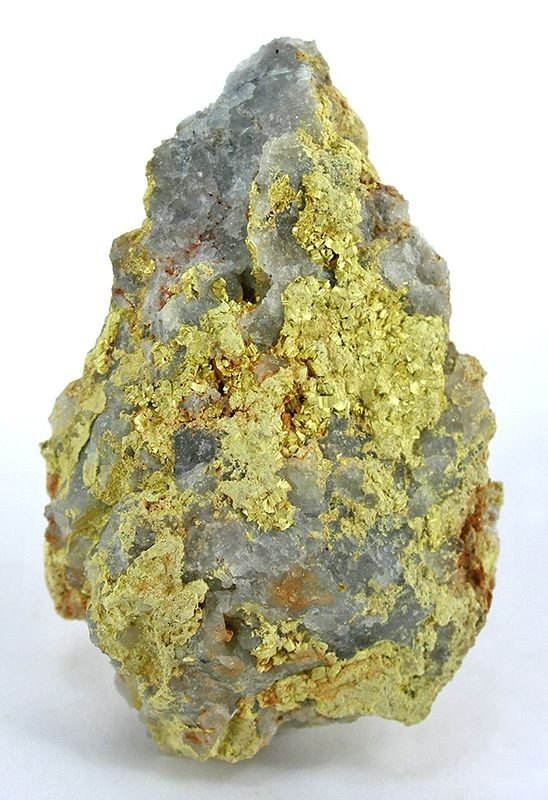
- Ferrimolybdite crystals from the Kingman District, Mohave County, Arizona

General
- Category: Molybdate mineral
- Formula: Fe^{3+}_{2}(MoO_{4})_{3}·8(H_{2}O) or Fe^{3+}_{2}(MoO_{4})_{3}·n(H_{2}O)
- IMA symbol: Fmyb
- Strunz classification: 7.GB.30
- Crystal system: Orthorhombic
- Crystal class: Dipyramidal (mmm); H-M symbol: (2/m 2/m 2/m)
- Space group: Pmmn
- Unit cell: a = 6.665, b = 15.423 c = 29.901 [Å]; Z = 8

Identification
- Color: Canary-yellow, straw-yellow, greenish yellow
- Crystal habit: Acicular tufted to radial aggregates; powdery, earthy
- Cleavage: Distinct on {001}
- Fracture: Uneven
- Mohs scale hardness: 1-2
- Luster: Adamantine, silky, earthy
- Streak: Light yellow
- Diaphaneity: Transparent to translucent
- Specific gravity: 2.99
- Optical properties: Biaxial (+)
- Refractive index: n_{α} = 1.720 - 1.810 n_{β} = 1.730 - 1.830 n_{γ} = 1.850 - 2.040
- Birefringence: δ = 0.130 - 0.230
- Pleochroism: X = Y = clear to nearly colorless; Z = dirty gray to canary-yellow
- 2V angle: 26° to 32° (calculated)

Ferrimolybdite is a hydrous iron molybdate mineral with formula: Fe^{3+}_{2}(MoO_{4})_{3}·8(H_{2}O) or Fe^{3+}_{2}(MoO_{4})_{3}·n(H_{2}O). It forms coatings and radial aggregates of soft yellow needles which crystallize in the orthorhombic system.

== Discovery and occurrence ==
It was first described in 1914 for an occurrence in the Alekseevskii Mine in the Karysh River Basin, Khakassia Republic, Siberia, Russia. It was named for its composition (ferric iron and molybdenum).

It occurs as an oxidation product of molybdenum bearing ore deposits. Associated minerals include: molybdenite, pyrite and chalcopyrite.
