= Tungstate =

Chemical compound containing an oxyanion or mixed oxide of tungsten

Chemical structure of the orthotungstate ion (WO_{4}^{2−})

In chemistry, a tungstate is a compound that contains an oxyanion of tungsten or is a mixed oxide containing tungsten. The simplest tungstate ion is WO_{4}^{2−}, "orthotungstate". Many other tungstates belong to a large group of polyatomic ions that are termed polyoxometalates, ("POMs"), and specifically termed isopolyoxometalates as they contain, along with oxygen and maybe hydrogen, only one other element. Almost all useful tungsten ores are tungstates.

== Structures ==
Orthotungstates feature tetrahedral W(VI) centres with short W–O distances of 1.79 Å (179 pm). Structurally, they resemble sulfates. Six-coordinate, octahedral tungsten dominates in the polyoxotungstates. In these compounds, the W–O distances are elongated.

Some examples of tungstate ions:

- HWO_{4}^{−} (hydrogentungstate)
- polymeric W_{2}O_{7}^{2−} ions of various structures in Na_{2}W_{2}O_{7}, Li_{2}W_{2}O_{7} and Ag_{2}W_{2}O_{7}
- [W_{7}O_{24}]^{6−} (paratungstate A)
- [W_{10}O_{32}]^{4−} (tungstate Y)
- [H_{2}W_{12}O_{42}]^{10−} (paratungstate B)
- α-[H_{2}W_{12}O_{40}]^{6−} (metatungstate)
- β-[H_{2}W_{12}O_{40}]^{6−} (tungstate X)

See the tungstates category for a list of tungstates.

== Occurrence ==
Tungstates occur naturally with molybdates. Scheelite, the mineral calcium tungstate, often contains a small amount of molybdate. Wolframite is manganese and iron tungstate, and all these are valuable sources of tungsten. Powellite is a mineral form of calcium molybdate containing a small amount of tungstate.

== Reactions ==
Solutions of tungstates, like those of molybdates, give intensely blue solutions of complex tungstate(V,VI) analogous to the molybdenum blues when reduced by most organic materials.

Unlike chromate, tungstate is not a good oxidizer, but like chromate, solutions of tungstate condense to give the isopolytungstates upon acidification.

Treatment of tungstate solutions with hydrogen peroxide gives peroxide complexes, including the yellow salts of [W(O_{2})_{4}]^{2−}.
