= Hyposulfite =

Hyposulfite may refer to:

- The sulfoxylate anion (SO^{2−}_{2})
- The thiosulfate anion (S_{2}O^{2−}_{3})
  - Sodium thiosulfate, a salt containing the thiosulfate anion
- S_{2}O^{2−}_{2}, a reported sulfur oxyanion. However salts containing S_{2}O^{2−}_{2} and HS_{2}O^{−}_{2} are not well characterized; they would be conjugate bases derived from the parent thiosulfurous acid (H_{2}S_{2}O_{2}), which is also of doubtful existence.
- Dithionite (S_{2}O^{2−}_{4}) as in sodium dithionite.
