= Molybdovanadate reagent =

The molybdovanadate reagent is a solution containing both the molybdate and vanadate ions. It is commonly used in the determination of phosphate ion content. The reagent used contains ammonium molybdovanadate with the addition of a strong acid such as perchloric acid, sulfuric acid, or nitric acid. It is used for purposes such as the analysis of wine, canned fruits and other fruit-based products such as jams and syrups.

== Physical properties ==
The reagent appears as a clear, yellow liquid without odour. It is harmful if inhaled, a recognised carcinogen and can cause eye burns.
