= Silver decamolybdate =

Names
- Other names: Molybdenum silver oxide

Identifiers
CAS Number	67272-42-8
3D model (JSmol)	Interactive image
- InChI: InChI=1S/6Ag.10Mo.33O/q6*+1;10*+6;33*-2 Key: GLQQEPPBXLRBRG-UHFFFAOYSA-N
- SMILES: [Ag+].[Ag+].[Ag+].[Ag+].[Ag+].[Ag+].[Mo+6].[Mo+6].[Mo+6].[Mo+6].[Mo+6].[Mo+6].[Mo+6].[Mo+6].[Mo+6].[Mo+6].[O-2].[O-2].[O-2].[O-2].[O-2].[O-2].[O-2].[O-2].[O-2].[O-2].[O-2].[O-2].[O-2].[O-2].[O-2].[O-2].[O-2].[O-2].[O-2].[O-2].[O-2].[O-2].[O-2].[O-2].[O-2].[O-2].[O-2].[O-2].[O-2].[O-2].[O-2].[O-2].[O-2]

Properties
Chemical formula	Ag_{6}Mo_{10}O_{33}
Molar mass	2134.68 g·mol^{−1}
Appearance	Yellow solid

Structure
Crystal structure	triclinic
Space group	P1 (No. 1)
Lattice constant	a = 7.59 Å, b = 8.31 Å, c = 11.42 Å α = 82.6°, β = 102.9°, γ = 106.4°
Formula units (Z)	1 formula per cell

Related compounds
Related compounds	Silver molybdate
- Except where otherwise noted, data are given for materials in their standard state (at 25 °C [77 °F], 100 kPa). Infobox references

Silver decamolybdate is an inorganic compound with the chemical formula Ag_{6}Mo_{10}O_{33}. It can be prepared by hydrothermal synthesis and grown into nanorods by melt-quenching. It is used as an alternative to platinum electrocatalysts for oxygen reduction reactions. Silver decamolybdate films can detect ammonia in air at concentrations greater than 2 ppm.

== General references ==
- Kumar, Vipin; Matz, Sebastian; Hoogestraat, Dirk; Bhavanasi, Venkateswarlu; Parida, Kaushik; Al-Shamery, Katharina; Lee, Pooi See (2016). "Design of Mixed-Metal Silver Decamolybdate Nanostructures for High Specific Energies at High Power Density". Advanced Materials. 28 (32): 6966–6975. Bibcode:2016AdM....28.6966K. doi:10.1002/adma.201601158. ISSN 1521-4095. PMID 27185225.
