= Sonochemical synthesis =

Sonochemical synthesis is the process which utilizes the principles of sonochemistry to make molecules undergo a chemical reaction with the application of powerful ultrasound radiation (20 kHz–10 MHz). Sonochemistry generates hot spots that can achieve very high temperatures (5000–25.000 K), pressures of more than 1000 atmospheres, and rates of heating and cooling that can exceed 10^11 K/s. High intensity ultrasound produces chemical and physical effects that can be used for the production or modification of a wide range of nanostructured materials. The principle that causes the modification of nanostructures in the sonochemical process is acoustic cavitation.
