= Ammonium dimolybdate =

Names
- Other names ADM

Identifiers
CAS Number	27546-07-2
3D model (JSmol)	Interactive image
ChemSpider	9306724
ECHA InfoCard	100.044.092
EC Number	248-517-2
PubChem CID	21895884
CompTox Dashboard (EPA)	DTXSID7094399
- InChI: InChI=1S/2Mo.H3N.8O/h;;1H3;;;;;;;;/q;;;;;;;4*-1/p+1 Key: UHQWHVHZVHVJFE-UHFFFAOYSA-O
- SMILES: [NH4+].[O-][Mo](=O)(=O)O[Mo](=O)(=O)[O-].[NH4+]

Properties
Chemical formula	H_{8}N_{2}Mo_{2}O_{7}
Appearance	white solid
Density	2.97 g/cm^{3}
- Except where otherwise noted, data are given for materials in their standard state (at 25 °C [77 °F], 100 kPa). Infobox references

Ammonium dimolybdate (ADM) is the inorganic compound with the formula (NH_{4})_{2}Mo_{2}O_{7}. It is a white, water-soluble solid. ADM is an intermediate in the production of molybdenum compounds from its ores. Roasting typical ore produces crude molybdenum(VI) oxides, which can be extracted into aqueous ammonia, affording ammonium molybdate. Heating solutions of ammonium molybdate gives ADM. Upon heating, solid ammonium dimolybdate decomposes to molybdenum trioxide:

(NH_{4})_{2}Mo_{2}O_{7} → 2 MoO_{3} + 2 NH_{3} + H_{2}O

In terms of its chemical structure, the anion is a polymeric consisting of distorted octahedral Mo centers linked by tetrahedral molybdate centers. When prepared in the absence of water as its tetrabutylammonium salt, dimolybdate adopts the centrosymmetric structure observed for dichromate.
