= Powellite =

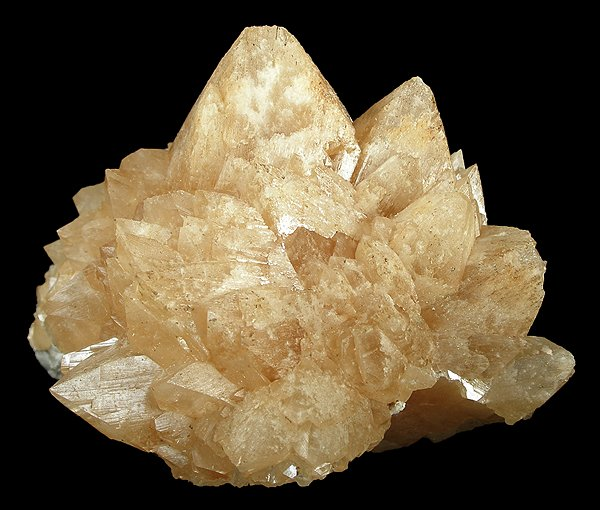

General
- Category: Molybdate minerals
- Formula: CaMoO_{4}
- IMA symbol: Pwl
- Strunz classification: 7.GA.05
- Crystal system: Tetragonal
- Crystal class: Dipyramidal (4/m) (same H-M symbol)
- Space group: I4_{1}/a
- Unit cell: a = 5.222 Å, c = 11.425 Å; Z = 4

Identification
- Formula mass: 200.02 g/mol
- Color: Straw-yellow, greenish yellow, yellow-brown, brown, colorless, may show blue to black zones
- Crystal habit: Flat tabular crystals often paper-thin on {001}, may be crusty to pulverulent or massive
- Cleavage: Indistinct on {011}, {112} and {001}
- Fracture: Conchoidal
- Mohs scale hardness: 3.5-4
- Luster: Adamantine
- Streak: light yellow
- Diaphaneity: Transparent
- Specific gravity: 4.25
- Optical properties: Uniaxial (+)
- Refractive index: n_{ω} = 1.974 n_{ε} = 1.984
- Birefringence: δ = 0.010
- Pleochroism: O = blue; E = green
- Ultraviolet fluorescence: Fluoresces bright yellow under shortwave ultraviolet light, dimmer under longwave

Powellite is a calcium molybdate mineral with formula CaMoO_{4}. Powellite crystallizes with tetragonal – dipyramidal crystal structure as transparent adamantine blue, greenish-brown, yellow-to-grey typically anhedral forms. It exhibits distinct cleavage, and has a brittle-to-conchoidal fracture. It has a Mohs hardness of 3.5 to 4 and a specific gravity of 4.25. It forms a solid solution series with scheelite (calcium tungstate, CaWO_{4}). It has refractive index values of n_{ω}=1.974 and n_{ε}=1.984.

Powellite was first described by William Harlow Melville in 1891 for an occurrence in the Peacock Mine, Adams County, Idaho, and named for American explorer and geologist, John Wesley Powell (1834–1902).

It occurs in hydrothermal ore deposits of molybdenum within the near-surface oxidized zones. It also appears as a rare mineral phase in pegmatite, tactite and basalt. Minerals found in association with powellite include molybdenite, ferrimolybdite, stilbite, laumontite and apophyllite.
