= Cowan–Reines neutrino experiment =

Institute of Technology Experimental confirmation of neutrinos

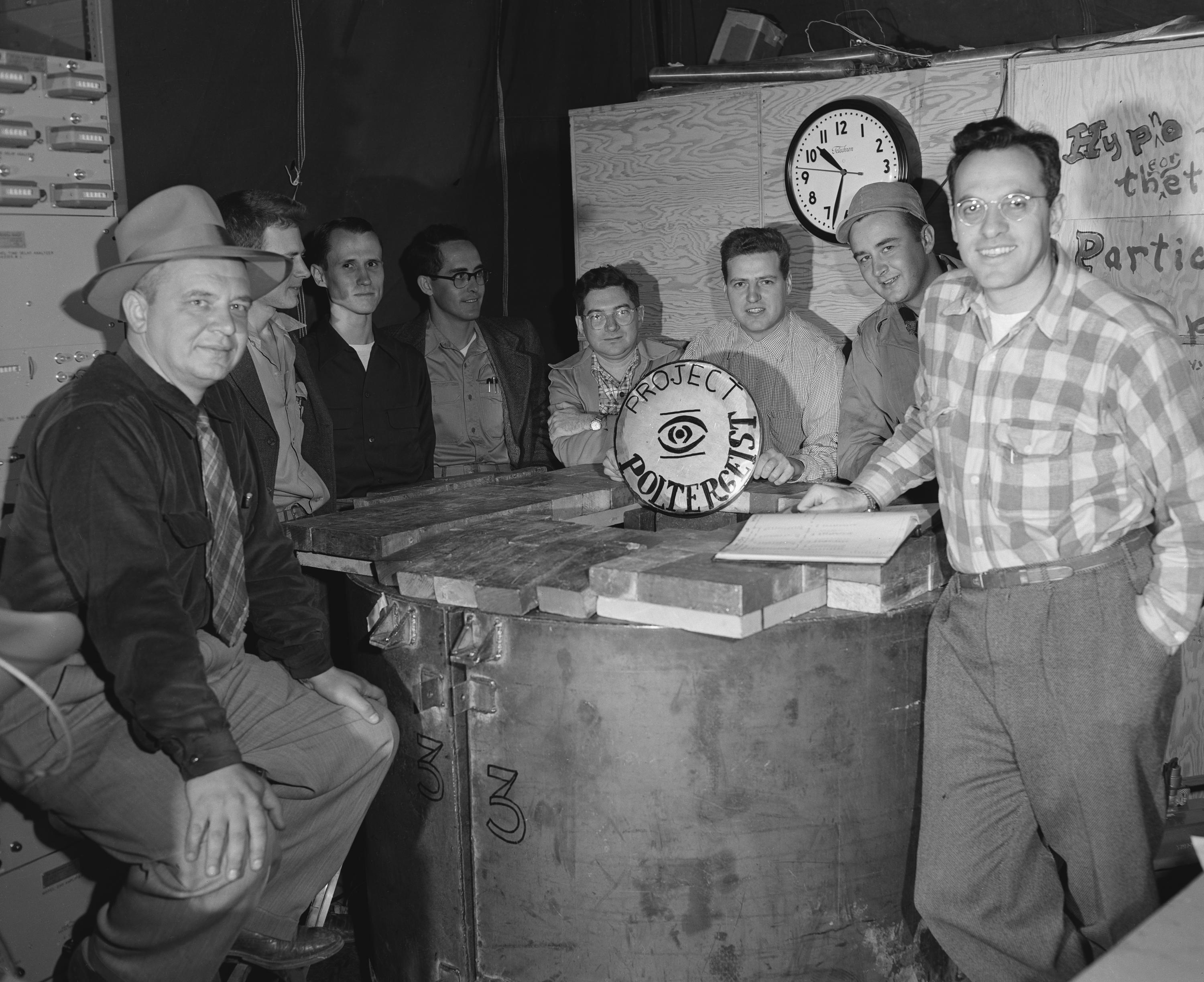
Frederick Reines (far right) with Clyde Cowan (far left) and other members of Project Poltergeist

The Cowan–Reines neutrino experiment was conducted by physicists Clyde Cowan and Frederick Reines in 1956. The experiment confirmed the existence of neutrinos. Neutrinos, subatomic particles with no electric charge and very small mass, had been conjectured to be an essential particle in beta decay processes in the 1930s. With no charge and minuscule mass, such particles appeared to be impossible to detect. The experiment exploited a huge flux of (then hypothetical) electron antineutrinos emanating from a nearby nuclear reactor and a detector consisting of large tanks of water. Neutrino interactions with the protons of the water were observed, verifying the existence and basic properties of this particle for the first time.

== Background ==
During the 1910s and 1920s, the observations of electrons from the nuclear beta decay showed that their energy had a continuous distribution. If the process involved only the atomic nucleus and the electron, the electron's energy would have a single, narrow peak, rather than a continuous energy spectrum. Only the resulting electron was observed, so its varying energy suggested that energy may not be conserved. This quandary and other factors led Wolfgang Pauli to attempt to resolve the issue by postulating the existence of the neutrino in 1930. If the fundamental principle of energy conservation was to be preserved, beta decay had to be a three-body, rather than a two-body, decay. Therefore, in addition to an electron, Pauli suggested that another particle was emitted from the atomic nucleus in beta decay. This particle, the neutrino, had very small mass and no electric charge; it was not observed, but it carried the missing energy.

Pauli's suggestion was developed into a proposed theory for beta decay by Enrico Fermi in 1933. The theory posits that the beta decay process consists of four fermions directly interacting with one another. By this interaction, the neutron decays directly to an electron, the conjectured neutrino (later determined to be an antineutrino) and a proton. The theory, which proved to be remarkably successful, relied on the existence of the hypothetical neutrino. Fermi first submitted his "tentative" theory of beta decay to the journal Nature, which rejected it "because it contained speculations too remote from reality to be of interest to the reader."

One problem with the neutrino conjecture and Fermi's theory was that the neutrino appeared to have such weak interactions with other matter that it would never be observed. In a 1934 paper, Rudolf Peierls and Hans Bethe calculated that neutrinos could easily pass through the Earth without interactions with any matter.

== Potential for experiment ==
By inverse beta decay, the predicted neutrino, more correctly an electron antineutrino ($\bar{\nu}_e$), should interact with a proton (p) to produce a neutron (n) and positron ($e^+$),

$$\bar{\nu}_e + p \to n + e^+$$

The chance of this reaction occurring was small. The probability for any given reaction to occur is in proportion to its cross section. Cowan and Reines predicted a cross section for the reaction to be about 6×10^{−44} cm^{2}. The usual unit for a cross section in nuclear physics is a barn, which is 1×10^{−24} cm^{2} and 20 orders of magnitudes larger.

Despite the low probability of the neutrino interaction, the signatures of the interaction are unique, making detection of the rare interactions possible. The positron, the antimatter counterpart of the electron, quickly interacts with any nearby electron, and they annihilate each other. The two resulting coincident gamma rays (γ) are detectable. The neutron can be detected by its capture by an appropriate nucleus, releasing a third gamma ray. The coincidence of the positron annihilation and neutron capture events gives a unique signature of an antineutrino interaction.

A water molecule is composed of an oxygen and two hydrogen atoms, and most of the hydrogen atoms of water have a single proton for a nucleus. Those protons can serve as targets for antineutrinos, so that simple water can serve as a primary detecting material. The hydrogen atoms are so weakly bound in water that they can be viewed as free protons for the neutrino interaction. The interaction mechanism of neutrinos with heavier nuclei, those with several protons and neutrons, is more complicated, since the constituent protons are strongly bound within the nuclei.

== Setup ==
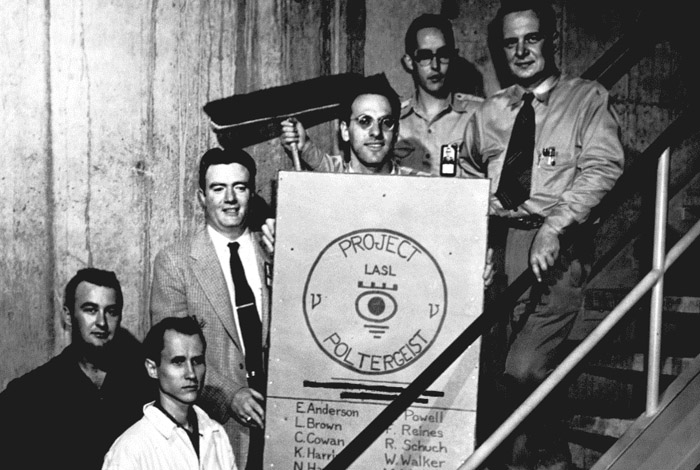
Group portrait of the "Project Poltergeist" team searching for the neutrino; Frederick Reines holds the poster, Clyde Cowan is at far right; Los Alamos Scientific Laboratory, c. 1953

Given the small chance of interaction of a single neutrino with a proton, neutrinos could only be observed using a huge neutrino flux. Beginning in 1951, Cowan and Reines, both then scientists at Los Alamos, New Mexico, initially thought that neutrino bursts from the atomic weapons tests that were then occurring could provide the required flux. For a neutrino source, they proposed using an atomic bomb. Permission for this was obtained from the laboratory director, Norris Bradbury. The plan was to detonate a "20-kiloton nuclear bomb, comparable to that dropped on Hiroshima, Japan". The detector was proposed to be dropped at the moment of explosion into a hole 40 meters from the detonation site "to catch the flux at its maximum"; it was named "El Monstro". They eventually used a nuclear reactor as a source of neutrinos, as advised by Los Alamos physics division leader J.M.B. Kellogg. The reactor had a neutrino flux of 5×10^{13} neutrinos per second per square centimeter, far higher than any flux attainable from other radioactive sources. The source specifically was beta minus decay from fission products, creating electron antineutrinos, for example in the fission production iodine-131:

$\ce{^{131}_{53}I -> ^{131}_{54}Xe^\ast{} + \beta^{-} + \bar\nu_e + 606 keV}$

A detector consisting of two tanks of water was employed, offering a huge number of potential targets in the protons of the water. At those rare instances when neutrinos interacted with protons in the water, neutrons and positrons were created:

$\bar{\nu}_e + p \to n + e^+$

or rather

$\ce{\bar{\nu}_{e} + H2O \to OH^{-}{} + n{} + e^+}$

Electron–positron annihilation then occurs:

$\ce{e^{+}{} + e^{-} \to 2\gamma_{511 keV}}$

The two gamma rays created by positron annihilation were detected by sandwiching the water tanks between tanks filled with liquid scintillator. The scintillator material gives off flashes of light in response to the gamma rays, and these light flashes are detected by photomultiplier tubes. The scintillator used was the wavelength shifter POPOP, which peaks in violet light:

$\ce{\gamma_{511 keV} \ + C24H16N2O2 \to C24H16N2O2 \ + A \gamma_{3 eV}}$

The additional detection of the neutron from the neutrino interaction provided a second layer of certainty. Cowan and Reines detected the neutrons by dissolving cadmium chloride, CdCl_{2}, in the tank. Cadmium is a highly effective neutron absorber and gives off a gamma ray when it absorbs a neutron.

n + ^{108}Cd → ^{109m}Cd → ^{109}Cd + γ

The arrangement was such that after a neutrino interaction event, the two gamma rays from the positron annihilation would be detected, followed by the gamma ray from the neutron absorption by cadmium several microseconds later.

The experiment that Cowan and Reines devised used two tanks with a total of about 200 liters of water with about 40 kg of dissolved CdCl_{2}. The water tanks were sandwiched between three scintillator layers which contained 110 five-inch (127 mm) photomultiplier tubes.

== Results ==
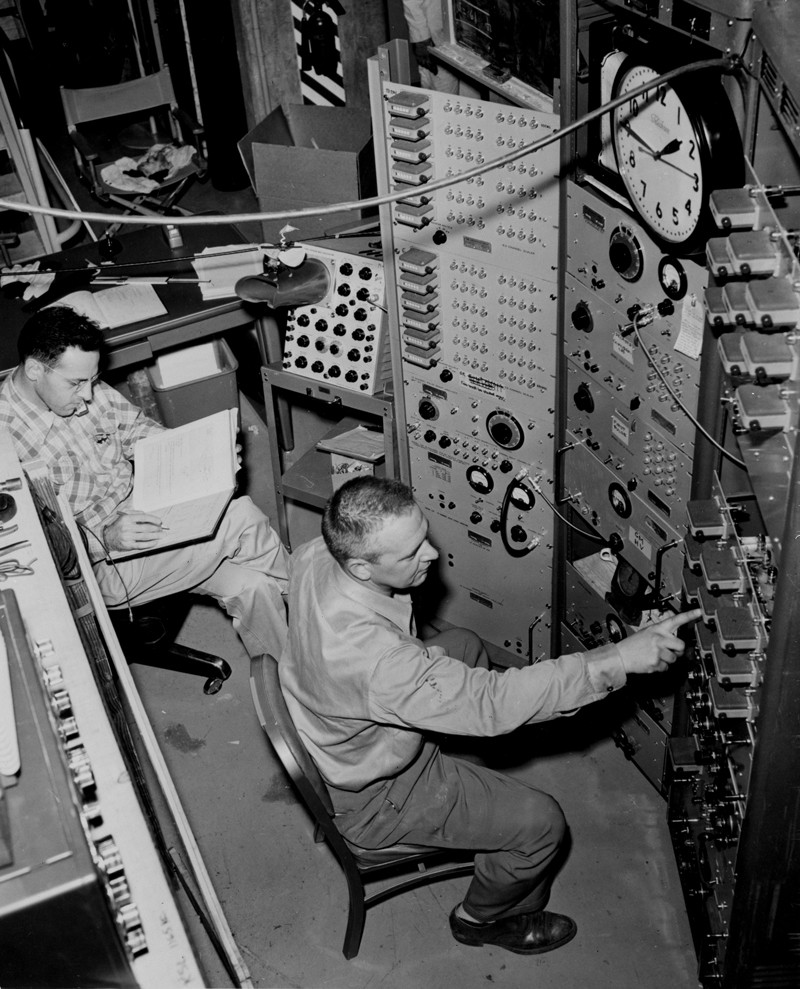
Frederick Reines, left, and Clyde Cowan, at the controls of the Savannah River experiment, 1956

In 1953, Cowan and Reines built a detector they dubbed "Herr Auge" ("Mr. Eye" in German). They called the neutrino-searching experiment "Project Poltergeist", because of "the neutrino's ghostly nature". A preliminary experiment was performed in 1953 at the Hanford Site in Washington state, but in late 1955 the experiment moved to the Savannah River Plant near Aiken, South Carolina. The Savannah River site had better shielding against cosmic rays. This shielded location was 11 m from the reactor and 12 m underground.

After months of data collection, the accumulated data showed about three neutrino interactions per hour in the detector. To be absolutely sure that they were seeing neutrino events from the detection scheme described above, Cowan and Reines shut down the reactor to show that there was a difference in the rate of detected events.

They had predicted a cross-section for the reaction to be about 6×10^{−44} cm^{2} and their measured cross-section was 6.3×10^{−44} cm^{2}. The results were published in the July 20, 1956 issue of Science.

== Legacy ==
Clyde Cowan died in 1974 at the age of 54. In 1995, Frederick Reines was honored with the Nobel Prize for his work on neutrino physics.

The basic strategy of employing massive detectors, often water based, for neutrino research was exploited by several subsequent experiments, including the Irvine–Michigan–Brookhaven detector, Kamiokande and follow-up experiments, the Sudbury Neutrino Observatory and the Homestake Experiment. The Homestake Experiment is a contemporary experiment which detected neutrinos from nuclear fusion in the solar core. Observatories such as these detected neutrino bursts from supernova SN 1987A in 1987, the birth of neutrino astronomy. Through observations of solar neutrinos, the Sudbury Neutrino Observatory was able to demonstrate the process of neutrino oscillation. Neutrino oscillation shows that neutrinos are not massless, a profound development in particle physics.

== See also ==
- List of neutrino experiments
- Subatomic particles
