= Radiation portal monitor =

Passive radiation detection device

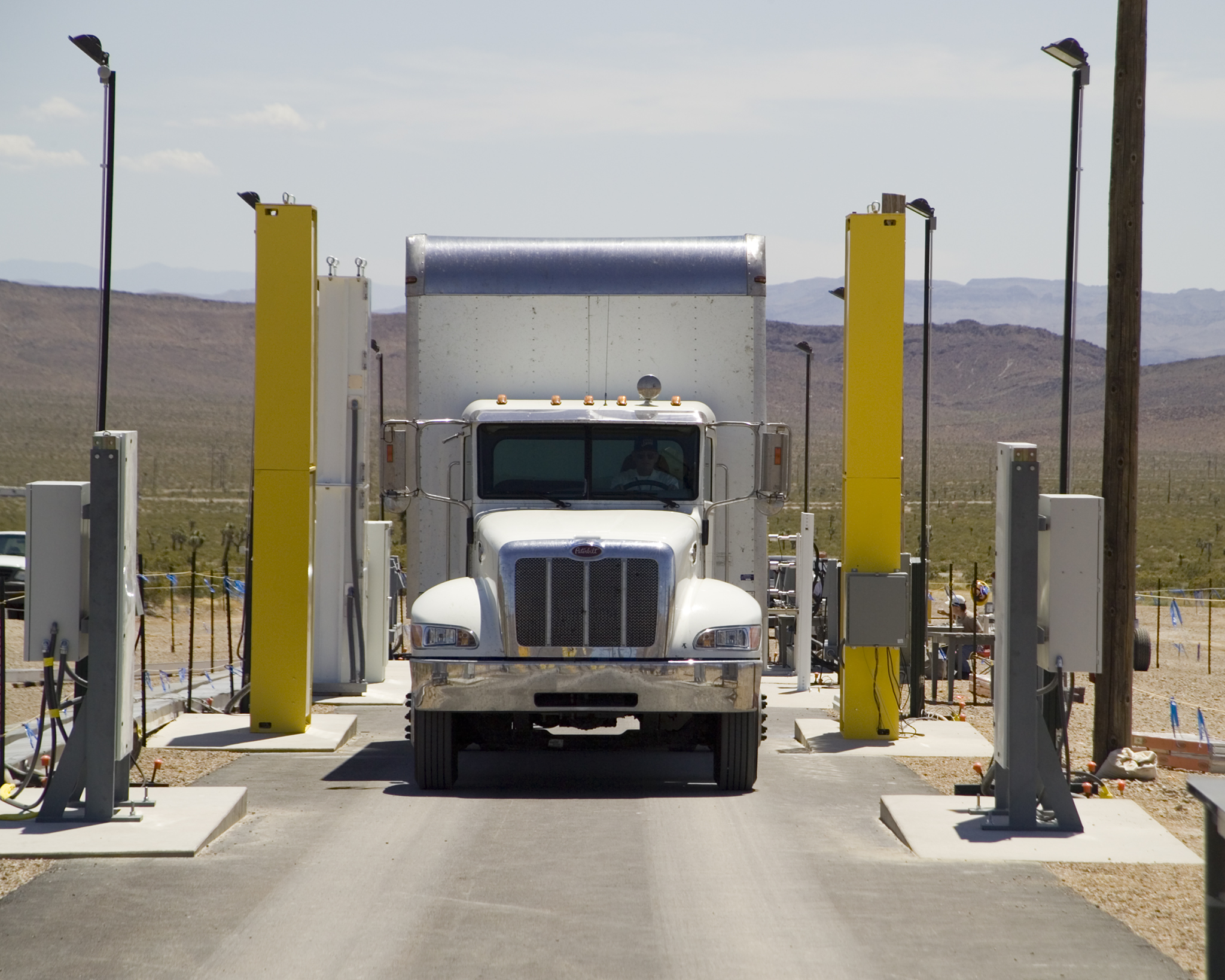
Truck driving through the Radiation Portal Monitor Test Area at the Nevada National Security Site.

Radiation Portal Monitors (RPMs) are passive radiation detection devices used for the screening of individuals, vehicles, cargo or other vectors for detection of illicit sources such as at borders or secure facilities. Fear of terrorist attacks with radiological weapons spurred RPM deployment for cargo scanning since 9/11, particularly in the United States.

== Application ==
RPMs were originally developed for screening individuals and vehicles at secure facilities such as weapons laboratories. They were deployed at scrap metal facilities to detect radiation sources mixed among scrap that could contaminate a facility and result in a costly clean up. As part of the effort to thwart nuclear smuggling after the breakup of the Soviet Union, RPMs were deployed around that territory, and later around many other European and Asian countries, by the US Department of Energy (DOE) National Nuclear Security Administration (NNSA) Second Line of Defense Program (SLD) starting in the late 1990s. After the attack of 9/11, the US Customs and Border Protection (CBP) started the Radiation Portal Monitor Program (RPMP) to deploy RPMs around all US borders (land, sea and air).

== Detected radiation ==
Radiation Portal Monitor (RPM) was designed to detect traces of radiation emitted from an object passing through a RPM. Gamma radiation is detected, and in some cases complemented by neutron detection when sensitivity for nuclear material is desired.

== Technology ==
=== PVT (gamma ray detection) ===
First generation RPMs often rely on PVT scintillators for gamma counting. They provide limited information on energy of detected photons, and as a result, they were criticized for their inability to distinguish gamma rays originating from nuclear sources from gamma rays originating from a large variety of benign cargo types that naturally emit radioactivity, including cat litter, granite, porcelain, stoneware, bananas etc. Those Naturally Occurring Radioactive Materials, called NORMs account for 99% of nuisance alarms. It is worth noting that bananas have erroneously been reported as the source of radiation alarms; they are not. Most produce contains potassium-40, but packing density of fruits and vegetables is too low to produce a significant signal. PVT does have the ability to provide some energy discrimination, which can be exploited to limit nuisance alarms from NORM.

=== NaI(Tl) (gamma ray detection) ===
In attempt to reduce the high nuisance alarm rates of first generation RPMs, the Advanced Spectroscopic Portal (ASP) program was called into life. Some of the portal monitors evaluated for this purposes are based on NaI(Tl) scintillating crystals. These devices, having better energy resolution than PVT, were supposed to reduce nuisance alarm rates by distinguishing threats from benign sources on the basis of the detected gamma radiation spectra. ASPs based on NaI(Tl) had a cost several times that of first generation RPMs. To date, NaI(Tl) based ASPs have not been able to demonstrate significantly better performance than PVT based RPMs.

The ASP program was canceled in 2011 after continued problems, including a high rate of false positives and difficulty maintaining stable operation.

=== HPGe (gamma ray detection) ===
In the scope of the ASP program, high purity germanium (HPGe) based portal monitors were evaluated. HPGe, having significantly better energy resolution than NaI(Tl), allows rather precise measurement of the isotopes contributing to gamma ray spectra. However, due to very high costs and major constraints such as cryo-cooling requirements, US government support for HPGe based portal monitors was dropped.

=== ^{3}He (thermal neutron detection) ===
RPMs geared for interception of nuclear threats usually incorporate a neutron detection technology. The vast majority of all neutron detectors deployed in RPMs to date relies on He-3 tubes surrounded by neutron moderators. Since the end of 2009, however, the global He-3 supply crisis has made this technology unavailable. The search for alternative neutron detection technologies has yielded satisfactory results.

=== ^{4}He (fast neutron detection) ===
The latest technology being deployed at ports uses pressurized natural helium to directly detect fast neutrons, without the need for bulky neutron moderators. Utilizing recoil nuclei following neutron scatter events, natural helium glows (scintillates), allowing photomultipliers (e.g. SiPMs) to produce an electrical signal. Introducing moderators and lithium-6 to capture thermalized neutrons further increases the detection capabilities of natural helium, at the expense of losing the initial information of the neutrons (such as energy) and reducing sensitivity to shielded neutron-emitting materials.

== Radiological threats ==
RPMs are deployed with the aim to intercept radiological threats as well as to deter malicious groups from deploying such threats.

=== Radiological dispersal devices ===
Radiological dispersal devices (RDDs) are weapons of mass disruption rather than weapons of mass destruction. "Dirty bombs" are examples of RDDs. As the name suggests, an RDD aims at dispersing radioactive material over an area, causing high cleanup costs, psychological, and economic damage. Nevertheless, direct human losses caused by RDDs are low and not attributed to the radiological aspect. RDDs are easily fabricated and components readily obtainable. RDDs are comparatively easy to detect with RPMs due to their high level of radioactivity. RDDs emit gamma radiation as well as sometimes, depending on what isotopes are used, neutrons.

=== Nuclear devices ===
Improvised nuclear devices (INDs) and nuclear weapons are weapons of mass destruction. They are difficult to acquire, manufacture, refurbish, and handle. While INDs can be constructed to emit only low amounts of radiation making them difficult to detect with RPMs, all INDs emit some amounts of gamma and neutron radiation.

== Alarms ==
Gamma radiation as well as neutron radiation can cause RPMs to trigger an alarm procedure. Alarms caused by statistical fluctuations of detection rates are referred to as false alarms. Alarms caused by benign radioactive sources are referred to as nuisance alarms. Causes of nuisance alarms can be broken up into several large categories:

- Naturally occurring radioactive materials (NORM) and technically enhanced NORM (TENORM)
  - Ceramic, tiles, porcelain, pottery, granite, clay, and other rock and clay based products contain elevated levels of naturally occurring potassium-40 and to a smaller degree thorium-232 and other isotopes.
  - Propane gas tankers, full or empty, contain elevated levels of radium-226.
  - Many fertilizers and potash contain elevated levels of potassium-40.
  - Cat litter contains elevated levels of thorium-232.
- Medical isotope alarms constitute the majority of alarms in privately owned vehicle lanes at land borders and are usually due to medical treatment of the driver or passengers, mostly due to technetium-99m and thallium-201 and iodine-131.

== Deployment ==
This article relates primarily to RPMs deployed for screening trucks at ports of entry. Over 1400 RPMs are deployed at US borders and a similar number at foreign locations for the purpose of interdicting illicit radiological and nuclear material. The US deployments cover all land border vehicles, all seaport containerized cargo, and all mail and express courier facilities. Efforts are also being made to deploy similar measures to other cross border vectors including:

- Pedestrian radiation portal monitoring
- Air freight radiation portal monitoring
- Crane based radiation portal monitoring
- Air luggage radiation portal monitoring
- Railway radiation portal monitoring

RPMs are also deployed at civilian and military nuclear facilities to prevent theft of radiological materials. Steel mills often use RPMs to screen incoming scrap metal to avoid radioactive sources illegally disposed in this way. Garbage incineration plants often monitor incoming material to avoid contamination.
