= Lyso =

Lyso can refer to:

- Lutetium-yttrium oxyorthosilicate, known as LYSO, a scintillator crystal.

== See also ==
Lysol (disambiguation)
