= Cargo scanning =

Goods inspection system

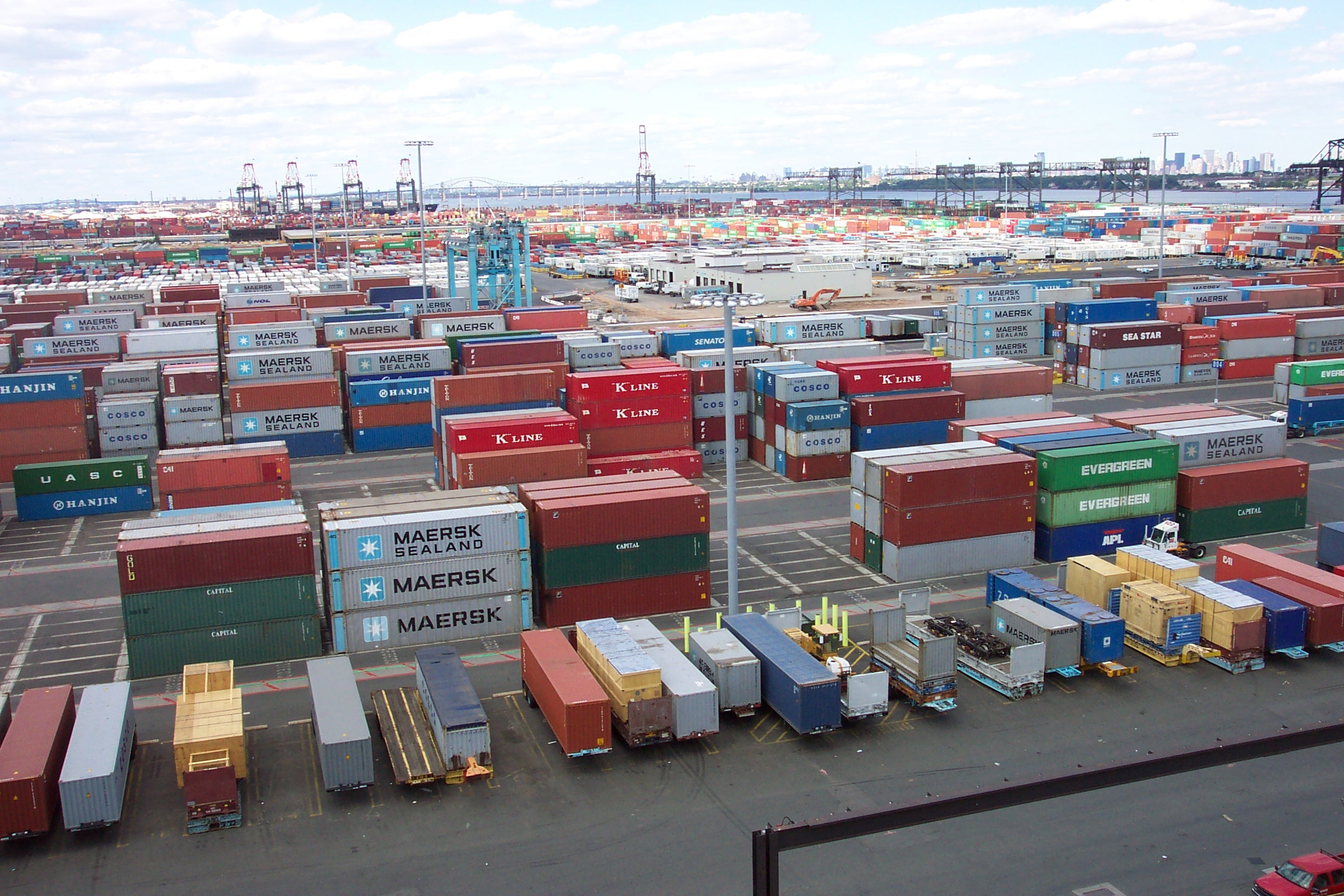
Intermodal shipping containers

Cargo scanning or non-intrusive inspection (NII) refers to non-destructive methods of inspecting and identifying goods in transportation systems. It is often used for scanning of intermodal freight shipping containers. In the US, it is spearheaded by the Department of Homeland Security and its Container Security Initiative (CSI) trying to achieve one hundred percent cargo scanning by 2012 as required by the US Congress and recommended by the 9/11 Commission. In the US the main purpose of scanning is to detect special nuclear materials (SNMs), with the added bonus of detecting other types of suspicious cargo. In other countries the emphasis is on manifest verification, tariff collection and the identification of contraband. In February 2009, approximately 80% of US incoming containers were scanned. To bring that number to 100% researchers are evaluating numerous technologies, described in the following sections.

== Radiography ==
=== Gamma-ray radiography ===
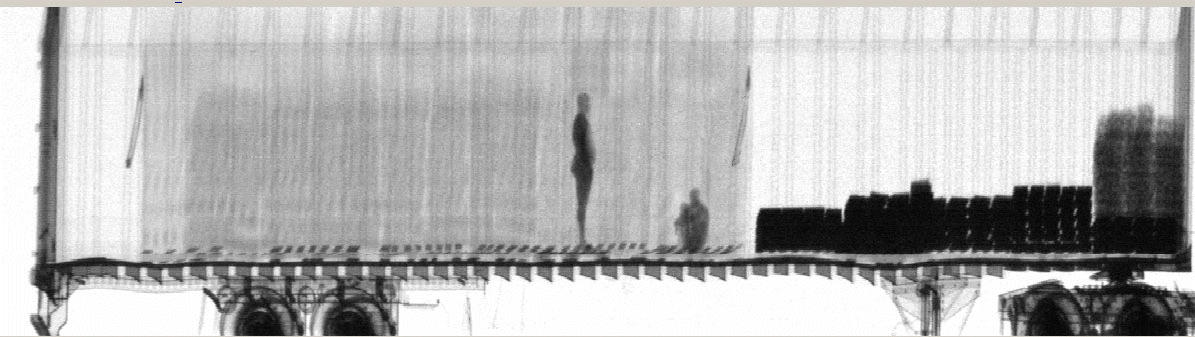
Gamma-ray image of a shipping container showing two stowaways hidden inside

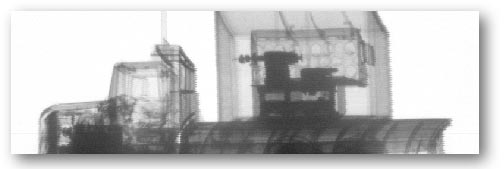
Gamma-ray image of a truck showing goods inside a shipping container

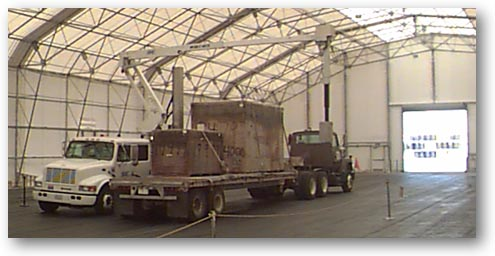
A truck entering a gamma-ray radiography system

Gamma-ray radiography systems capable of scanning trucks usually use cobalt-60 or caesium-137 as a radioactive source and a vertical tower of gamma detectors. This gamma camera is able to produce one column of an image. The horizontal dimension of the image is produced by moving either the truck or the scanning hardware. The cobalt-60 units use gamma photons with a mean energy 1.25 MeV, which can penetrate up to 15–18 cm of steel. The systems provide good quality images which can be used for identifying cargo and comparing it with the manifest, in an attempt to detect anomalies. It can also identify high-density regions too thick to penetrate, which would be the most likely to hide nuclear threats.

=== X-ray radiography ===
X-ray radiography is similar to gamma-ray radiography but instead of using a radioactive source, it uses a high-energy bremsstrahlung spectrum with energy in the 5–10 MeV range created by a linear particle accelerator (LINAC). Such X-ray systems can penetrate up to 30–40 cm of steel in vehicles moving with velocities up to 13 km/h. They provide higher penetration but also cost more to buy and operate. They are more suitable for the detection of special nuclear materials than gamma-ray systems. They also deliver about 1000 times higher dose of radiation to potential stowaways.

=== Dual-energy X-ray radiography ===
Dual-energy X-ray radiography

=== Backscatter X-ray radiography ===
Backscatter X-ray radiography

=== Neutron activation systems ===
Examples of neutron activation systems include: pulsed fast neutron analysis (PFNA), fast neutron analysis (FNA), and thermal neutron analysis (TNA). All three systems are based on neutron interactions with the inspected items and examining the resultant gamma rays to determine the elements being irradiated. TNA uses thermal neutron capture to generate the gamma rays. FNA and PFNA use fast neutron scattering to generate the gamma rays. Additionally, PFNA uses a pulsed collimated neutron beam. With this, PFNA generates a three-dimensional elemental image of the inspected item.

== Passive radiation detectors ==
=== Muon tomography ===
Cosmic radiation image identifying muon production mechanisms in Earth's atmosphere

Muon tomography is a technique that uses cosmic ray muons to generate three-dimensional images of volumes using information contained in the Coulomb scattering of the muons. Since muons are much more deeply penetrating than X-rays, muon tomography can be used to image through much thicker material than x-ray based tomography such as CT scanning. The muon flux at the Earth's surface is such that a single muon passes through a volume the size of a human hand per second.

Muon imaging was originally proposed and demonstrated by Alvarez. The method was re-discovered and improved upon by a research team at Los Alamos National Laboratory, muon tomography is completely passive, exploiting naturally occurring cosmic radiation. This makes the technology ideal for high throughput scanning of volume material where operators are present, such as at a marine cargo terminal. In these cases, truck drivers and customs personnel do not have to leave the vehicle or exit an exclusion zone during scanning, expediting cargo throughput.

Multi-mode passive detection systems (MMPDS), based upon muon tomography, are currently in use by Decision Sciences International Corporation at Freeport, Bahamas, and the Atomic Weapons Establishment in the United Kingdom. An MMPDS system has also been contracted by Toshiba to determine the location and the condition of the nuclear fuel in the Fukushima Daiichi Nuclear Power Plant.

=== Gamma radiation detectors ===
Radiological materials emit gamma photons, which gamma radiation detectors, also called radiation portal monitors (RPM), are good at detecting. Systems currently used in US ports (and steel mills) use several (usually 4) large PVT panels as scintillators and can be used on vehicles moving up to 16 km/h.

They provide very little information on energy of detected photons, and as a result, they were criticized for their inability to distinguish gammas originating from nuclear sources from gammas originating from a large variety of benign cargo types that naturally emit radioactivity, including bananas, cat litter, granite, porcelain, stoneware, etc. Those naturally occurring radioactive materials, called NORMs account for 99% of nuisance alarms. Some radiation, like in the case of large loads of bananas is due to potassium and its rarely occurring (0.0117%) radioactive isotope potassium-40, other is due to radium or uranium that occur naturally in earth and rock, and cargo types made out of them, like cat litter or porcelain.

Radiation originating from earth is also a major contributor to background radiation.

Another limitation of gamma radiation detectors is that gamma photons can be easily suppressed by high-density shields made from lead or steel, preventing detection of nuclear sources. Those types of shields do not stop fission neutrons produced by plutonium sources, however. As a result, radiation detectors usually combine gamma and neutron detectors, making shielding only effective for certain uranium sources.

=== Neutron radiation detectors ===
Fissile materials emit neutrons. Some nuclear materials, such as the weapons usable plutonium-239, emit large quantities of neutrons, making neutron detection a useful tool to search for such contraband. Radiation Portal Monitors often use Helium-3 based detectors to search for neutron signatures. However, a global supply shortage of He-3 has led to the search for other technologies for neutron detection.

== See also ==
- Industrial radiography
- Gamma spectroscopy
