= Cadmium tungstate =

Names
- IUPAC name Cadmium(II) tungstate

Identifiers
CAS Number	7790-85-4
3D model (JSmol)	Interactive image
ChemSpider	10636623
ECHA InfoCard	100.029.297
EC Number	232-226-2
PubChem CID	3080645
UNII	ZNL5ZHP0Q7
- InChI: InChI=1S/Cd.4O.W/q+2;;;2*-1; Key: OUMLAYUZCYYIOD-UHFFFAOYSA-N
- SMILES: [O-][W](=O)(=O)[O-].[Cd+2]

Properties
Chemical formula	CdWO_{4}
Molar mass	360.25 g·mol^{−1}
Appearance	colorless crystals with a yellow tint
Density	7.9 g/cm^{3}, solid
Melting point	1,325 °C (2,417 °F; 1,598 K)
Solubility in water	0.04642 g/100 mL (20 °C)

Hazards
- GHS labelling
Pictograms	(GHS07: Exclamation mark) (GHS09: Environmental hazard)
Signal word	Warning
Hazard statements	H302, H312, H332, H410
Precautionary statements	P261, P264, P270, P271, P273, P280, P301+P312, P302+P352, P304+P312, P304+P340, P312, P322, P330, P363, P391, P501
- NIOSH (US health exposure limits)
PEL (Permissible)	[1910.1027] TWA 0.005 mg/m^{3} (as Cd)
REL (Recommended)	Ca
IDLH (Immediate danger)	Ca [9 mg/m^{3} (as Cd)]
- Except where otherwise noted, data are given for materials in their standard state (at 25 °C [77 °F], 100 kPa). verify (what is ?) Infobox references

Cadmium tungstate (CdWO_{4} or CWO), the cadmium salt of tungstic acid, is a dense, chemically inert solid which is used as a scintillation crystal to detect gamma rays. It has density of 7.9 g/cm^{3} and melting point of 1325 °C. It is toxic if inhaled or swallowed. Its crystals are transparent, colorless, with slight yellow tint. It is odorless. Its CAS number is 7790-85-4. It is not hygroscopic.

The crystal is transparent and emits light when it is hit by gamma rays and x-rays, making it useful as a detector of ionizing radiation. Its peak scintillation wavelength is 480 nm (with emission range between 380 and 660 nm), and efficiency of 13000 photons/MeV. It has a relatively high light yield, its light output is about 40% of NaI(Tl), but the time of scintillation is quite long (12−15 μs). It is often used in computed tomography. Combining the scintillator crystal with externally applied piece of boron carbide allows construction of compact detectors of gamma rays and neutron radiation.

Cadmium tungstate was used as a replacement of calcium tungstate in some fluoroscopes since the 1940s. Very high radiopurity allows use of this scintillator as a detector of rare nuclear processes (double beta decay, other rare alpha and beta decays) in low-background applications. For example, the first indication of the natural alpha activity of tungsten (alpha decay of ^{180}W) was found in 2003 with CWO detectors. Due to different time of light emission for different types of ionizing particles, the alpha-beta discrimination technique has been developed for CWO scintillators.

Cadmium tungstate films can be deposited by sol-gel technology. Cadmium tungstate nanorods can be synthesized by a hydrothermal process.

Similar materials are calcium tungstate (scheelite) and zinc tungstate.

It is toxic, as are all cadmium compounds.
