= PVT =

PVT may refer to:

== Medicine ==
- Paraventricular nucleus of thalamus, a portion of the thalamus
- Portal vein thrombosis, a liver disease involving blood clots
- Psychomotor vigilance task, a sustained-attention, reaction-timed task that measures the speed with which subjects respond to a visual stimulus
- Pulseless ventricular tachycardia, a type of ventricular tachycardia

== Science and engineering ==
- PV/T or PV-T: photovoltaic thermal: photovoltaic thermal hybrid solar collector
- Physical vapor transport, another term for physical vapor deposition
- Polyvinyl toluene, an organic polymer
- Process, voltage, and temperature: process corners in electrical engineering
- Pressure, volume, and temperature: in an equation of state in physics and engineering
- Position, velocity, and time: in navigation systems
  - Especially in satellite navigation
- Production validation test, a type of engineering validation test

== Military ==
- Private (rank), a grade of military rank
- Rogožarski PVT, a Yugoslavian advanced trainer aircraft of World War II

== Other uses ==
- Parallel vote tabulation: quick count as an estimation of election returns
- Private: privacy
- Private limited company (Pvt Ltd), in Commonwealth countries such as Australia and India
- PVT (band), an experimental musical band
- Programme vacances travail (French: working holiday visa)
- Panja Vaishnav Tej, Indian actor
