= Phoswich detector =

Phoswich detectors were developed to detect low-intensity, low-energy gamma rays, X-rays, as well as alpha and beta particles efficiently in a higher-energy ambient background. Some detector designs can measure and separately identify all energies simultaneously.

A phoswich ("phosphor sandwich") is a combination of scintillators with dissimilar pulse shape characteristics optically coupled to each other and to a common PMT (or PMTs). Pulse shape analysis distinguishes the signals from the two scintillators, identifying in which scintillator the event occurred.

In 2010 development of a monolithic phoswich sensor technology was announced, departing from the discrete designs. This novel development, termed the continuous phoswich scintillator and detector, provides a number of bits of depth-of-interaction (DOI) information, a significant improvement over the 1 to 2 bits available previously with discrete phoswich scintillators.

Phoswich applications are frequently seen in sensitive and low-background radiation sensors used in space research.
