= Gadolinium oxyorthosilicate =

Scintillating inorganic crystal

Names
- IUPAC name dioxido(oxo)silane;gadolinium(3+);oxygen(2-)
- Other names: Gadolinium(III) oxyorthosilicate

Identifiers
CAS Number	12207-95-3
3D model (JSmol)	Interactive image
ChemSpider	57449448
EC Number	235-386-1
PubChem CID	44150499
CompTox Dashboard (EPA)	DTXSID60924071
- InChI: InChI=1S/2Gd.O3Si.2O/c;;1-4(2)3;;/q2*+3;3*-2 Key: XEVCWPDRHSBFQW-UHFFFAOYSA-N
- SMILES: [O-2].[O-2].[O-][Si](=O)[O-].[Gd+3].[Gd+3]

Properties
Chemical formula	Gd_{2}O_{5}Si
Molar mass	422.58 g·mol^{−1}
Density	6.7 g/cm^{3}
Melting point	1,900 °C (3,450 °F; 2,170 K)
- Except where otherwise noted, data are given for materials in their standard state (at 25 °C [77 °F], 100 kPa). Infobox references

Gadolinium oxyorthosilicate (known as GSO) is a type of scintillating inorganic crystal used for imaging in nuclear medicine and for calorimetry in particle physics.

The formula is Gd_{2}SiO_{5}. Its main properties are shown below:

Density (g/cm3)	6.7
Melting Point (°C)	1900
Radiation Length (cm)	1.38
Decay Constant (ns)	50-60
Light Yield (relative BGO=100%)	110
Index of Refraction	1.87
Peak Excitation (nm)	350
Radiation Hardness (rad)	>106
Hygroscopic	No
