= Birks' law =

Formula for light yield per path length

Birks' law (named after British physicist John B. Birks) is an empirical formula for the light yield per path length as a function of the energy loss per path length for a particle traversing a scintillator, and gives a relation that is not linear at high loss rates.

== Overview ==
The relation is:

$$\frac{dL}{dx} = S \frac{\frac{dE}{dx}}{1+kB\frac{dE}{dx}}.$$

where L is the light yield, S is the scintillation efficiency, dE/dx is the specific energy loss of the particle per path length, k is the probability of quenching, and B is a constant of proportionality linking the local density of ionized molecules at a point along the particle's path to the specific energy loss; "Since k and B appear only as a product, they act as one parameter, kB, called Birks' coefficient, which has units of distance per energy. Its value depends on the scintillating material."

kB is 1.32 × 10^{−2} g MeV^{−1} cm^{−2} (or equivalently, 0.126 mm/MeV) for polystyrene-based scintillators and 1.26–2.07 × 10^{−2} g MeV^{−1} cm^{−2} for polyvinyltoluene-based scintillators.

Birks speculated that the loss of linearity is due to recombination and quenching effects between the excited molecules and the surrounding substrate. Birks' law has mostly been tested for organic scintillators. Its applicability to inorganic scintillators is debated. A good discussion can be found in Particle Detectors at Accelerators: Organic scintillators. A compilation of Birks' constant for various materials can be found in Semi-empirical calculation of quenching factors for ions in scintillators. A more complete theory of scintillation saturation, that gives Birks' law when only unimolecular de-excitation is included, can be found in a paper by Blanc, Cambou, and De Laford.
