= Sanmartinite =

- Sanmartinite specimen from Mulatos, Sahuaripa Municipality, Sonora, Mexico

General
- Category: Oxide mineral
- Formula: ZnWO_{4}
- IMA symbol: Sma
- Strunz classification: 4.DB.30
- Dana classification: 48.01.01.03
- Crystal system: Monoclinic
- Space group: P2/_{1}c
- Unit cell: a = 4.69 Å, b = 5.73 Å, c = 4.92 Å; β = 90.8°; Z = 2

Identification
- Color: Reddish brown to dark brown or black-brown
- Cleavage: Perfect on {010}
- Mohs scale hardness: 5
- Luster: Resinous
- Streak: Reddish brown
- Diaphaneity: Translucent
- Density: 6.70 g/cm^{3} (measured); 7.87 g/cm^{3} (calculated for synthetic ZnWO_{4})
- Optical properties: Biaxial (+)

Sanmartinite is a rare tungstate mineral with the ideal chemical formula ZnWO_{4}. It is the zinc analogue of ferberite, FeWO_{4}, and hübnerite, MnWO_{4}, and belongs to the wolframite group.

Sanmartinite crystallizes in the monoclinic crystal system. It has only been found as fibrous to fine-grained masses and as microscopic tabular crystals up to about 60 μm in size.

== Etymology and history ==
Sanmartinite was first discovered in tungsten ore samples from the Los Cerillos deposit, about 7 km southwest of San Martín, San Luis Province, Argentina. It was described in 1948 by Victorio Angelelli and Samuel G. Gordon, who named it after its type locality.

Because sanmartinite was described before the establishment of the International Mineralogical Association in 1958, it is accepted as a grandfathered mineral.

Type material is held in several mineral collections, including the Harvard Mineralogical Museum, the Natural History Museum, London, the National Museum of Natural History in Washington, D.C., and the Academy of Natural Sciences of Philadelphia.

== Composition ==
The ideal composition of sanmartinite is ZnWO_{4}. In natural specimens, however, part of the zinc is commonly replaced by Fe^{2+} and minor Mn^{2+}, so the mineral is often represented more generally as (Zn,Fe)WO_{4}.

Analyses of material from the type locality gave compositions ranging approximately from (Zn_{0.52}Fe_{0.46}Mn_{0.02})WO_{4} to (Zn_{0.81}Fe_{0.18}Mn_{0.01})WO_{4}.

== Crystal structure ==
Sanmartinite is isostructural with the other members of the wolframite group. It crystallizes in space group P2/_{1}c, with lattice parameters approximately a = 4.69 Å, b = 5.73 Å, c = 4.92 Å and β = 90.8°, with two formula units per unit cell.

The structure consists of chains of edge-sharing octahedra containing Zn and W, characteristic of the wolframite structure type.

== Physical properties ==
Sanmartinite has a Mohs hardness of about 5 and perfect cleavage on {010}. Its measured density is about 6.70 g/cm^{3}, lower than the calculated value of 7.87 g/cm^{3} for pure synthetic ZnWO_{4}, reflecting substitution of iron and manganese in natural material.

It is translucent, with a resinous lustre. Its colour ranges from reddish brown with dark red internal reflections to dark brown or black-brown, and its streak is reddish brown.

== Occurrence ==
Sanmartinite is a very rare mineral. At its type locality it occurs as an alteration product associated with scheelite in quartz veins cutting granites and granitic pegmatites within Precambrian crystalline schists.

Associated minerals include beryl, chalcopyrite, muscovite, pyrite, sphalerite, tourmaline, willemite, scheelite and quartz.

Apart from the Los Cerillos type locality, sanmartinite has been reported from the Los Cóndores mine in San Luis Province, Argentina; the Chojlla mine in Bolivia; Lime Hill in Nova Scotia, Canada; and near Mulatos in Sonora, Mexico.

== See also ==
- List of minerals
- Zinc(II) tungstate
