= GAGG:Ce =

Scintillator material

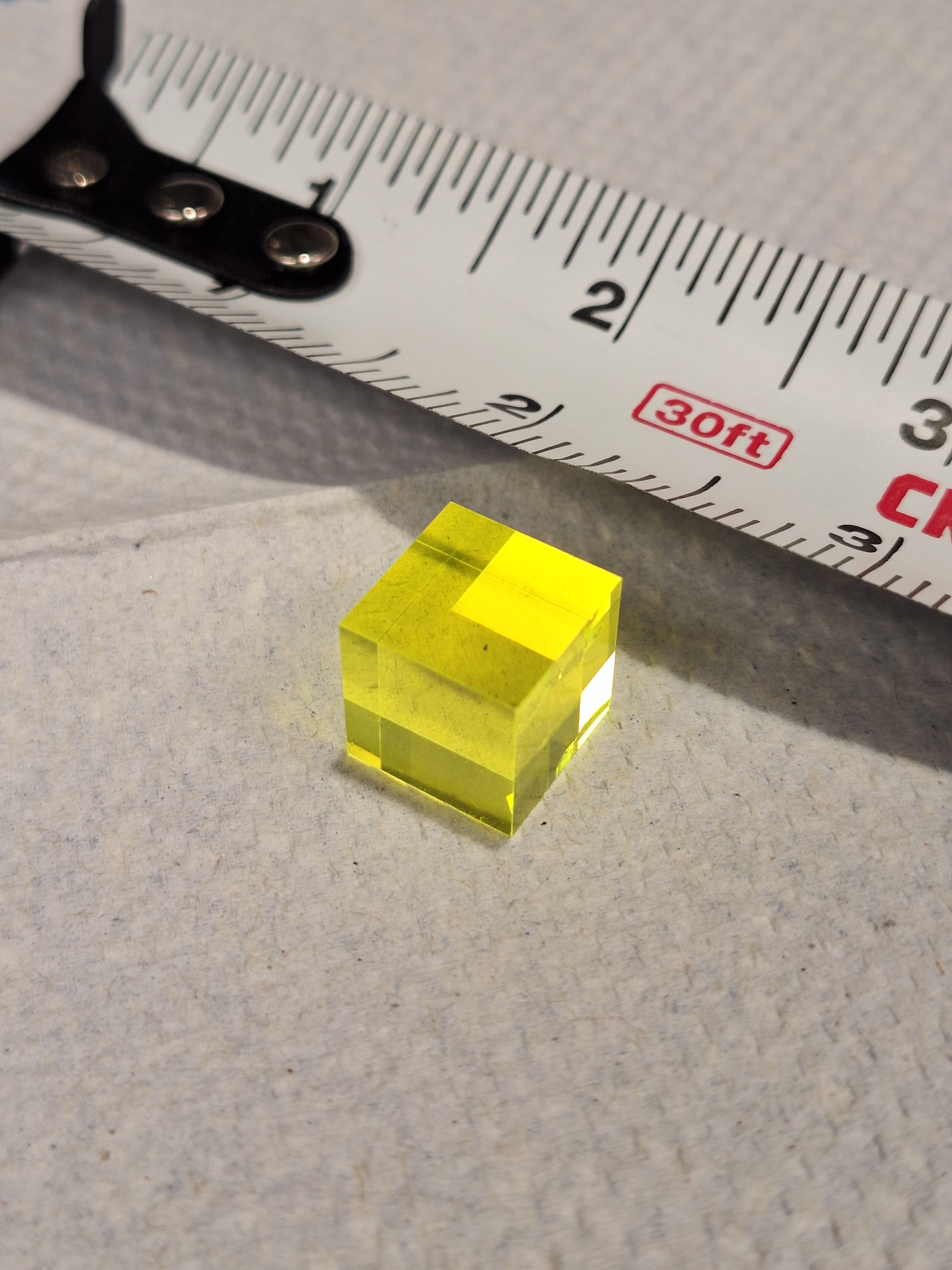
A 5 cubic cm sample of GAGG:Ce. It has a small crack down the side.

Cerium-doped gadolinium aluminium gallium garnet (GAGG:Ce) is a single-crystal scintillator material (can also be used as ceramic poly-crystal scintillator). It is being considered for applications in astrophysics, such as in high-energy gamma ray detection.

The Gamma-ray Transients Monitor (a space telescope), which tracks Gamma Ray Bursts (GRBs) and other bright gamma-ray transients with energies ranging from 50 keV to 2 MeV uses a GAGG scintillator array (50 mm x 50 mm x 8 mm) as its sensor units.
