= POPOP =

Names
- Preferred IUPAC name 2,2′-(1,4-Phenylene)bis(5-phenyl-1,3-oxazole)
- Other names POPOP

Identifiers
CAS Number	1806-34-4
3D model (JSmol)	Interactive image
ChEBI	CHEBI:52236
ChemSpider	14960
ECHA InfoCard	100.015.731
EC Number	217-304-6
PubChem CID	15732
UNII	MDI740G2Q0
CompTox Dashboard (EPA)	DTXSID7061984
- InChI: InChI=1S/C24H16N2O2/c1-3-7-17(8-4-1)21-15-25-23(27-21)19-11-13-20(14-12-19)24-26-16-22(28-24)18-9-5-2-6-10-18/h1-16H Key: MASVCBBIUQRUKL-UHFFFAOYSA-N; InChI=1/C24H16N2O2/c1-3-7-17(8-4-1)21-15-25-23(27-21)19-11-13-20(14-12-19)24-26-16-22(28-24)18-9-5-2-6-10-18/h1-16H Key: MASVCBBIUQRUKL-UHFFFAOYAO
- SMILES: C1=CC=C(C=C1)C2=CN=C(O2)C3=CC=C(C=C3)C4=NC=C(O4)C5=CC=CC=C5

Properties
Chemical formula	C_{24}H_{16}N_{2}O_{2}
Molar mass	364.40 g/mol
- Except where otherwise noted, data are given for materials in their standard state (at 25 °C [77 °F], 100 kPa). verify (what is ?) Infobox references

POPOP or 1,4-bis(5-phenyloxazol-2-yl) benzene is a scintillator. It is used as a wavelength shifter (also called a "secondary scintillator"), which means that it converts shorter wavelength light to longer wavelength light. Its output spectrum peaks at 410 nm, which is violet. POPOP is used in both solid and liquid organic scintillators.
