= Lutetium–yttrium oxyorthosilicate =

Identifiers
CAS Number	100% Lu: 12168-86-4; 100% Y: 100403-12-1
3D model (JSmol)	100% Lu: Interactive image; 100% Y: Interactive image
EC Number	100% Lu: 235-337-4; 100% Y: 309-553-5
PubChem CID	100% Lu: 44146686; 100% Y: 156620211
- InChI: 100% Lu: InChI=1S/2Lu.O3Si.2O/c;;1-4(2)3;;/q2*+3;3*-2 Key: CQWPFSRJOYBVLT-UHFFFAOYSA-N; 100% Y: InChI=1S/O4Si.O.2Y/c1-5(2,3)4;;;/q-4;-2;2*+3 Key: GCIFCXOUMNEOGC-UHFFFAOYSA-N
- SMILES: 100% Lu: [O-2].[O-2].[O-][Si](=O)[O-].[Lu+3].[Lu+3]; 100% Y: [O-2].[O-][Si]([O-])([O-])[O-].[Y+3].[Y+3]

Properties
Chemical formula	Lu_{2(1-x)}Y_{2x}SiO_{5}
Molar mass	988.21 g/mol
Density	Between 4.44 g/cm^{3} and 7.4 g/cm^{3}, depending on Y/Lu ratio
Melting point	2,047 °C (3,717 °F; 2,320 K)
Refractive index (n_{D})	1.82
- Except where otherwise noted, data are given for materials in their standard state (at 25 °C [77 °F], 100 kPa). Infobox references

Lutetium–yttrium oxyorthosilicate, also known as LYSO, is an inorganic chemical compound with main use as a scintillator crystal for gamma radiation detection. Its chemical formula is Lu_{2(1-x)}Y_{2x}SiO_{5}. The percentage of yttrium varies considerably, with values in the literature ranging from 5% to 70%. It is commonly used to build screens and electromagnetic calorimeters in particle physics. LYSO crystals have the advantages of high light output and density, quick decay time, excellent energy resolution. The crystals are often grown in boules using the Czochralski process, and cutting or polishing can be challenging because LYSO is brittle and hard.

== Intrinsic radiation in gamma spectroscopy ==
LYSO scintillators contain naturally occurring ^{176}Lu, a radioactive isotope of lutetium that undergoes beta decay, emitting gamma radiation at 88 keV, 202 keV, and 307 keV. This intrinsic activity introduces background signals that can interfere with low-energy gamma detection, making LYSO less suitable for applications requiring ultra-low background noise. However, the intrinsic peaks can be used for energy calibration and gain stabilization, and advanced signal processing techniques—such as background subtraction, energy windowing, or coincidence timing discrimination—can help mitigate these effects, allowing LYSO to remain a viable choice for mid-to-high-energy gamma.
