= Lysol (disambiguation) =

Lysol is a trade name for common household cleaners.

Lysol may also refer to:

- Lysol (album), a 1992 album by The Melvins
- Lysol, a character portrayed by muMs da Schemer "The Mad Real World" skit on Chappelle's Show
- Lysol 200, an event in the 1999 NASCAR Busch Series
