= Scintillator =

Material which glows when excited by ionizing radiation

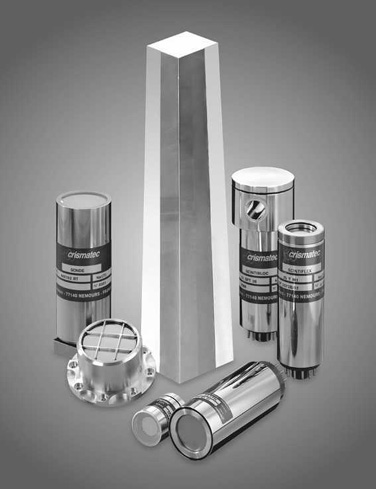
Scintillation crystal surrounded by various scintillation detector assemblies

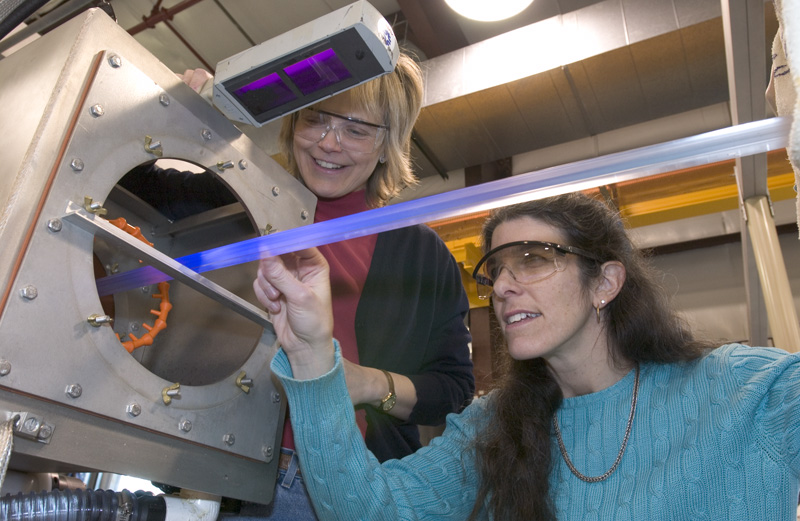
Extruded plastic scintillator material fluorescing under a UV inspection lamp at Fermilab for the MINERνA project

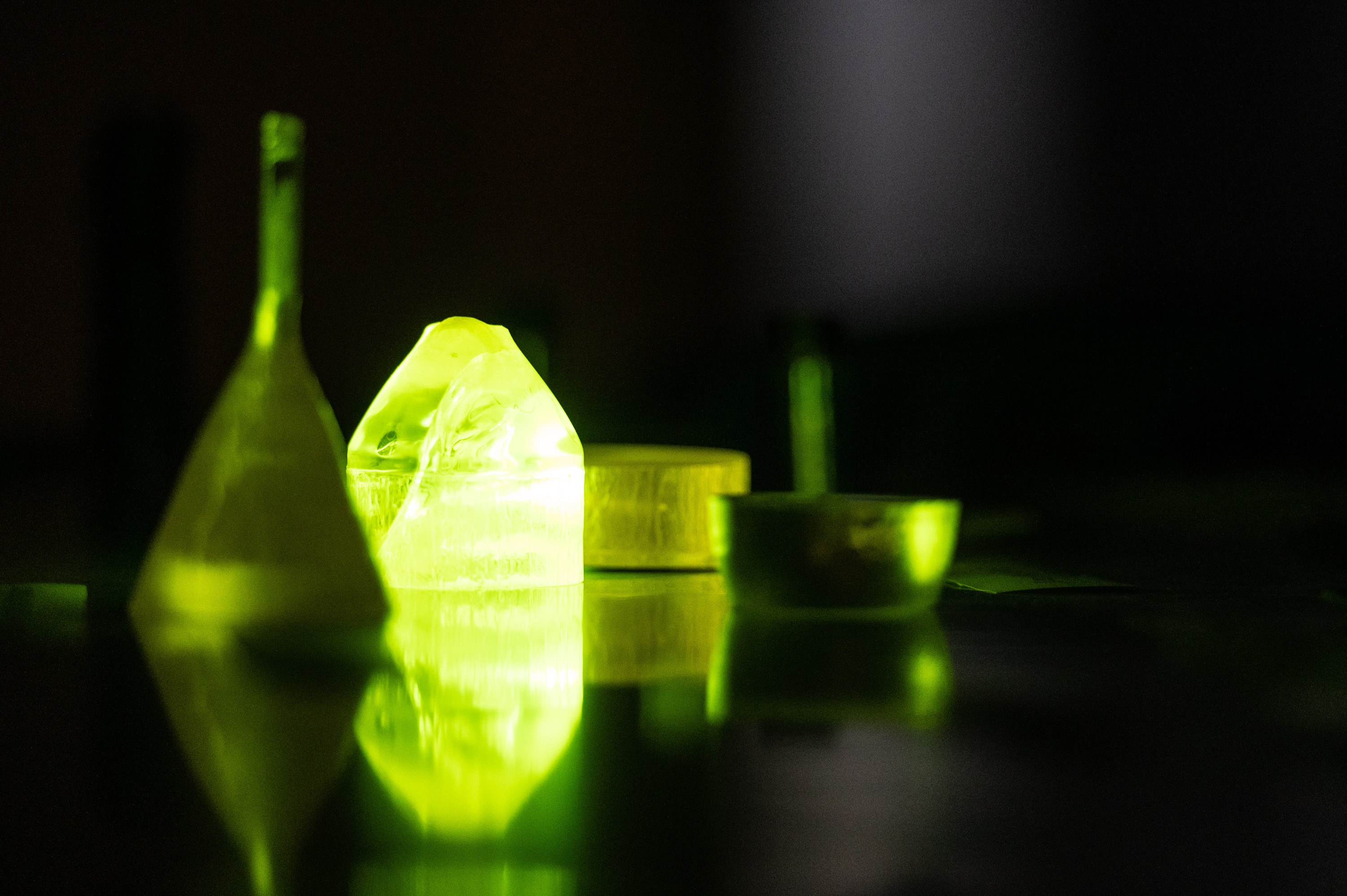
Various scintillation crystals. The second crystal from the left is targeted by an UV source and shines brightly in visible light.

A scintillator (/ˈsɪntɪleɪtər/ SIN-til-ay-ter) is a material that exhibits scintillation (also termed radioluminescence), a kind of luminescence, when excited by ionizing radiation. Luminescent materials, when struck by an incoming particle, absorb its energy and scintillate (i.e. re-emit the absorbed energy in the form of light). (Note: In this article, "particle" is used to mean "ionizing radiation" and can refer either to charged particulate radiation, such as electrons and heavy charged particles, or to uncharged radiation, such as photons and neutrons, provided that they have enough energy to induce ionization.) Sometimes, the excited state is metastable, so the relaxation back down from the excited state to lower states is delayed (necessitating anywhere from a few nanoseconds to hours depending on the material). The process then corresponds to one of two phenomena: delayed fluorescence or phosphorescence. The correspondence depends on the type of transition and hence the wavelength of the emitted optical photon.

== Principle of operation ==
A scintillation detector or scintillation counter is obtained when a scintillator is coupled to an electronic light sensor such as a photomultiplier tube (PMT), photodiode, or silicon photomultiplier (SiPM). PMTs absorb the light emitted by the scintillator and re-emit it in the form of electrons via the photoelectric effect. The subsequent multiplication of those electrons (sometimes called photo-electrons) results in an electrical pulse which can then be analyzed and yield meaningful information about the particle that originally struck the scintillator.

Vacuum photodiodes are similar but do not amplify the signal while silicon photodiodes, on the other hand, detect incoming photons by the excitation of charge carriers directly in the silicon. Silicon photomultipliers consist of an array of photodiodes which are reverse-biased with sufficient voltage to operate in avalanche mode, enabling each pixel of the array to be sensitive to single photons.

== History ==
The first device which used a scintillator was built in 1903, by Sir William Crookes and used a ZnS screen. The scintillations produced by the screen were visible if viewed by a microscope in a darkened room; the device was known as a spinthariscope. The technique led to a number of important discoveries but was obviously tedious. Scintillators gained additional attention in 1944, when Curran and Baker replaced the naked eye measurement with the newly developed PMT. This was the birth of the modern scintillation detector.

== Applications for scintillators ==
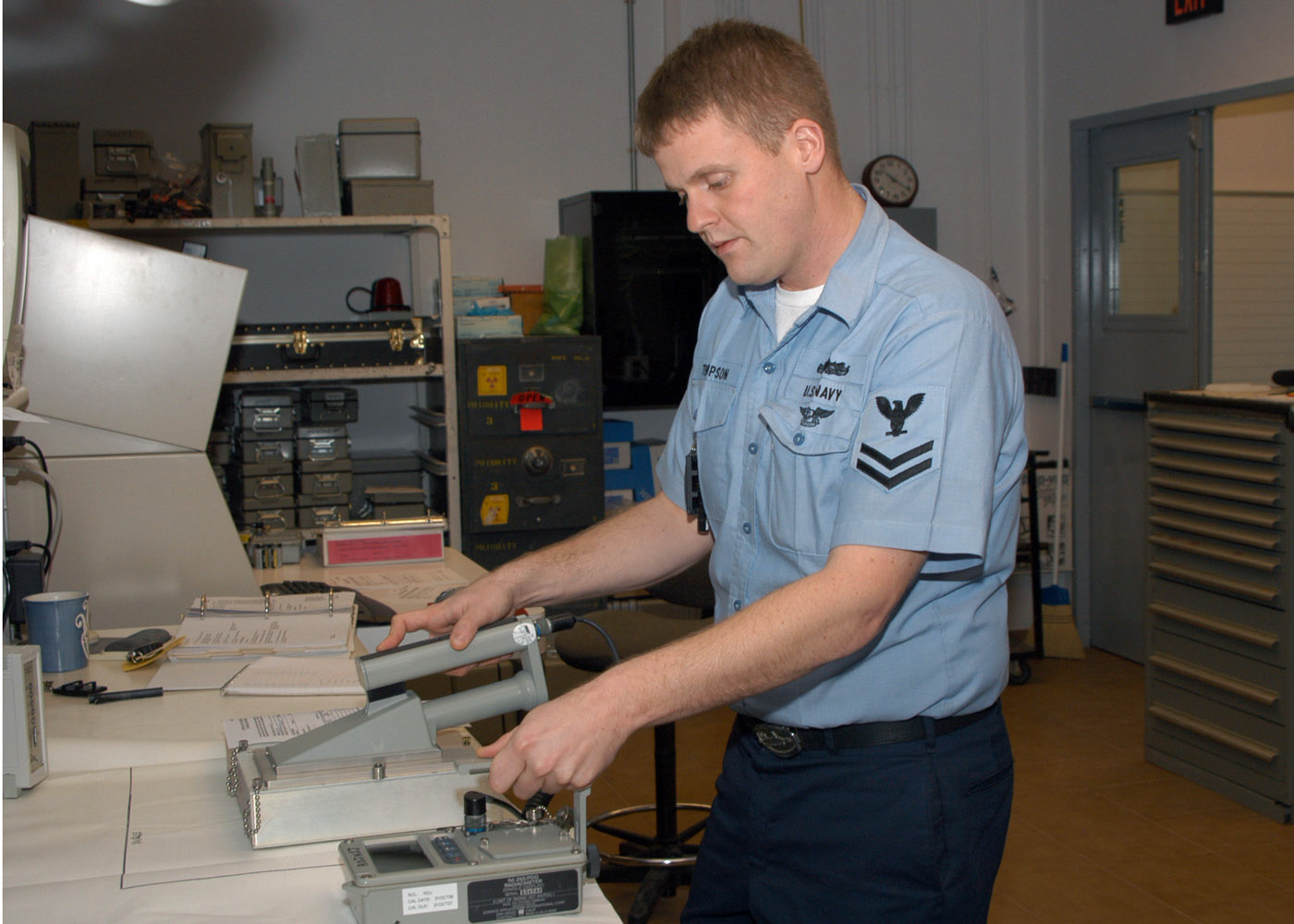
Alpha scintillation probe for detecting surface contamination is being tested.

Scintillators are used by the American government as Homeland Security radiation detectors. Scintillators can also be used in particle detectors, new energy resource exploration, X-ray security, nuclear cameras, computed tomography and gas exploration.

Other applications of scintillators include CT scanners and gamma cameras in medical diagnostics, and screens in older style CRT computer monitors and television sets. Scintillators have also been proposed as part of theoretical models for the harnessing of gamma-ray energy through the photovoltaic effect, for example in a nuclear battery.

The use of a scintillator in conjunction with a photomultiplier tube finds wide use in hand-held survey meters used for detecting and measuring radioactive contamination and monitoring nuclear material. Scintillators generate light in fluorescent tubes, to convert the ultra-violet of the discharge into visible light. Scintillation detectors are also used in the petroleum industry as detectors for Gamma Ray logs.

== Properties of scintillators ==
There are many desired properties of scintillators, such as high density, fast operation speed, low cost, radiation hardness, production capability, and durability of operational parameters. High density reduces the material size of showers for high-energy γ-quanta and electrons. The range of Compton scattered photons for lower energy γ-rays is also decreased via high density materials. This results in high segmentation of the detector and leads to better spatial resolution. Usually high density materials have heavy ions in the lattice (e.g., lead, cadmium), significantly increasing the contribution of photoelectric effect (~Z^{4}). The increased photo-fraction is important for some applications such as positron emission tomography.

High stopping power for electromagnetic component of the ionizing radiation needs greater photo-fraction; this allows for a compact detector. High operating speed is needed for good resolution of spectra. Precision of time measurement with a scintillation detector is proportional to √τ_{sc}. Short decay times are important for the measurement of time intervals and for the operation in fast coincidence circuits. High density and fast response time can allow detection of rare events in particle physics. Particle energy deposited in the material of a scintillator is proportional to the scintillator's response.

Charged particles, γ-quanta and ions have different slopes when their response is measured. Thus, scintillators could be used to identify various types of γ-quanta and particles in fluxes of mixed radiation. Another consideration of scintillators is the cost of producing them. Most crystal scintillators require high-purity chemicals and sometimes rare-earth metals that are fairly expensive. Not only are the materials an expenditure, but many crystals require expensive furnaces and almost six months of growth and analyzing time. Currently, other scintillators are being researched for reduced production cost.

Several other properties are also desirable in a good detector scintillator: a low gamma output (i.e., a high efficiency for converting the energy of incident radiation into scintillation photons), transparency to its own scintillation light (for good light collection), efficient detection of the radiation being studied, a high stopping power, good linearity over a wide range of energy, a short rise time for fast timing applications (e.g., coincidence measurements), a short decay time to reduce detector dead-time and accommodate high event rates, emission in a spectral range matching the spectral sensitivity of existing PMTs (although wavelength shifters can sometimes be used), an index of refraction near that of glass (≈1.5) to allow optimum coupling to the PMT window. Ruggedness and good behavior under high temperature may be desirable where resistance to vibration and high temperature is necessary (e.g., oil exploration). The practical choice of a scintillator material is usually a compromise among those properties to best fit a given application.

Among the properties listed above, the light output is the most important, as it affects both the efficiency and the resolution of the detector (the efficiency is the ratio of detected particles to the total number of particles impinging upon the detector; the energy resolution is the ratio of the full width at half maximum of a given energy peak to the peak position, usually expressed in %). The light output is a strong function of the type of incident particle or photon and of its energy, which therefore strongly influences the type of scintillation material to be used for a particular application.

The presence of quenching effects results in reduced light output (i.e., reduced scintillation efficiency). Quenching refers to all radiationless de‑excitation processes in which the excitation is degraded mainly to heat. The overall signal production efficiency of the detector, however, also depends on the quantum efficiency of the PMT (typically ~30% at peak), and on the efficiency of light transmission and collection (which depends on the type of reflector material covering the scintillator and light guides, the length/shape of the light guides, any light absorption, etc.). The light output is often quantified as a number of scintillation photons produced per keV of deposited energy. Typical numbers are (when the incident particle is an electron): ≈40 photons/keV for NaI(Tl), ~10 photons/keV for plastic scintillators, and ~8 photons/keV for bismuth germanate (BGO).

Scintillation detectors are generally assumed to be linear. This assumption is based on two requirements: (1) that the light output of the scintillator is proportional to the energy of the incident radiation; (2) that the electrical pulse produced by the photomultiplier tube is proportional to the emitted scintillation light. The linearity assumption is usually a good rough approximation, although deviations can occur (especially pronounced for particles heavier than the proton at low energies).

Resistance and good behavior under high-temperature, high-vibration environments is especially important for applications such as oil exploration (wireline logging, measurement while drilling). For most scintillators, light output and scintillation decay time depends on the temperature. This dependence can largely be ignored for room-temperature applications since it is usually weak. The dependence on the temperature is also weaker for organic scintillators than it is for inorganic crystals, such as NaI-Tl or BGO. Strong dependence of decay time on the temperature in BGO scintillator is used for remote monitoring of temperature in vacuum environment. The coupled PMTs also exhibit temperature sensitivity, and can be damaged if submitted to mechanical shock. Hence, high temperature rugged PMTs should be used for high-temperature, high-vibration applications.

The time evolution of the number of emitted scintillation photons N in a single scintillation event can often be described by linear superposition of one or two exponential decays. For two decays, we have the form:

$$N = A\exp\left(-\frac{t}{ {\tau}_f}\right) + B\exp\left(-\frac{t}{ {\tau}_s}\right)$$

where τ_{f} and τ_{s} are the fast (or prompt) and the slow (or delayed) decay constants. Many scintillators are characterized by 2 time components: one fast (or prompt), the other slow (or delayed). While the fast component usually dominates, the relative amplitude A and B of the two components depend on the scintillating material. Both of these components can also be a function of the energy loss dE/dx. In cases where this energy loss dependence is strong, the overall decay time constant varies with the type of incident particle. Such scintillators enable pulse shape discrimination, i.e., particle identification based on the decay characteristics of the PMT electric pulse. For instance, when BaF_{2} is used, γ rays typically excite the fast component, while α particles excite the slow component: it is thus possible to identify them based on the decay time of the PMT signal.

== Types of scintillators ==
=== Organic crystals ===
Organic scintillators are aromatic hydrocarbon compounds which contain benzene ring structures interlinked in various ways. Their luminescence typically decays within a few nanoseconds.

Some organic scintillators are pure crystals. The most common types are anthracene (C_{14}H_{10}, decay time ≈30 ns), stilbene (C_{14}H_{12}, 4.5 ns decay time), and naphthalene (C_{10}H_{8}, few ns decay time). They are very durable, but their response is anisotropic (which spoils energy resolution when the source is not collimated), and they cannot be easily machined, nor can they be grown in large sizes; hence they are not very often used. Anthracene has the highest light output of all organic scintillators and is therefore chosen as a reference: the light outputs of other scintillators are sometimes expressed as a percentage of anthracene light output.

=== Organic liquids ===
These are liquid solutions of one or more organic scintillators in an organic solvent. The typical solutes are fluors such as p-terphenyl (C_{18}H_{14}), PBD (C_{20}H_{14}N_{2}O), butyl PBD (C_{24}H_{22}N_{2}O), PPO (C_{15}H_{11}NO), and wavelength shifter such as POPOP (C_{24}H_{16}N_{2}O). The most widely used solvents are toluene, xylene, benzene, phenylcyclohexane, triethylbenzene, and decalin. Liquid scintillators are easily loaded with other additives such as wavelength shifters to match the spectral sensitivity range of a particular PMT, or ^{10}B to increase the neutron detection efficiency of the scintillation counter itself (since ^{10}B has a high interaction cross section with thermal neutrons). Newer approaches combine several solvents or load different metals to achieve identification of incident particles. For many liquids, dissolved oxygen can act as a quenching agent and lead to reduced light output, hence the necessity to seal the solution in an oxygen-free, airtight enclosure.

=== Plastic scintillators ===
The term "plastic scintillator" typically refers to a scintillating material in which the primary fluorescent emitter, called a fluor, is suspended in the base, a solid polymer matrix. While this combination is typically accomplished through the dissolution of the fluor prior to bulk polymerization, the fluor is sometimes associated with the polymer directly, either covalently or through coordination, as is the case with many Li6 plastic scintillators. Polyethylene naphthalate has been found to exhibit scintillation by itself without any additives and is expected to replace existing plastic scintillators due to higher performance and lower price.

The advantages of plastic scintillators include fairly high light output and a relatively quick signal, with a decay time of 2–4 nanoseconds, but perhaps the biggest advantage of plastic scintillators is their ability to be shaped, through the use of molds or other means, into almost any desired form with what is often a high degree of durability. Plastic scintillators are known to show light output saturation when the energy density is large (Birks' law).

==== Bases ====
The most common bases used in plastic scintillators are the aromatic plastics, polymers with aromatic rings as pendant groups along the polymer backbone, amongst which polyvinyltoluene (PVT) and polystyrene (PS) are the most prominent. While the base does fluoresce in the presence of ionizing radiation, its low yield and negligible transparency to its own emission make the use of fluors necessary in the construction of a practical scintillator. Aside from the aromatic plastics, the most common base is polymethylmethacrylate (PMMA), which carries two advantages over many other bases: high ultraviolet and visible light transparency and mechanical properties and higher durability with respect to brittleness. The lack of fluorescence associated with PMMA is often compensated through the addition of an aromatic co-solvent, usually naphthalene. A plastic scintillator based on PMMA in this way boasts transparency to its own radiation, helping to ensure uniform collection of light.

Other common bases include polyvinyl xylene (PVX) polymethyl, 2,4-dimethyl, 2,4,5-trimethyl styrenes, polyvinyl diphenyl, polyvinyl naphthalene, polyvinyl tetrahydronaphthalene, and copolymers of these and other bases.

==== Fluors ====
Also known as luminophors, these compounds absorb the scintillation of the base and then emit at larger wavelength, effectively converting the ultraviolet radiation of the base into the more easily transferred visible light. Further increasing the attenuation length can be accomplished through the addition of a second fluor, referred to as a spectrum shifter or converter, often resulting in the emission of blue or green light.

Common fluors include polyphenyl hydrocarbons, oxazole and oxadiazole aryls, especially, n-terphenyl (PPP), 2,5-diphenyloxazole (PPO), 1,4-di-(5-phenyl-2-oxazolyl)-benzene (POPOP), 2-phenyl-5-(4-biphenylyl)-1,3,4-oxadiazole (PBD), and 2-(4'-tert-butylphenyl)-5-(4″-biphenylyl)-1,3,4-oxadiazole (B-PBD).

=== Inorganic crystals ===
Inorganic scintillators are usually crystals grown in high temperature furnaces, for example, alkali metal halides, often with a small amount of activator impurity. The most widely used is NaI(Tl) (thallium-doped sodium iodide); its scintillation light is blue. Other inorganic alkali halide crystals are: CsI(Tl), CsI(Na), CsI(pure), CsF, KI(Tl), LiI(Eu). Some non-alkali crystals include: BGO, BaF_{2}, CaF_{2}(Eu), ZnS(Ag), CaWO_{4}, CdWO_{4}, YAG(Ce) (Y_{3}Al_{5}O_{12}(Ce)), GSO, LSO, GAGG:Ce. (For more examples, see also phosphors).

Newly developed products include LaCl_{3}(Ce), lanthanum chloride doped with cerium, as well as a cerium-doped lanthanum bromide, LaBr_{3}(Ce). They are both very hygroscopic (i.e., damaged when exposed to moisture in the air) but offer excellent light output and energy resolution (63 photons/keV γ for LaBr_{3}(Ce) versus 38 photons/keV γ for NaI(Tl)), a fast response (16 ns for LaBr_{3}(Ce) versus 230 ns for NaI(Tl)), excellent linearity, and a very stable light output over a wide range of temperatures. In addition LaBr_{3}(Ce) offers a higher stopping power for γ rays (density of 5.08 g/cm^{3} versus 3.67 g/cm^{3} for NaI(Tl)). LYSO (Lu_{1.8}Y_{0.2}SiO_{5}(Ce)) has an even higher density (7.1 g/cm^{3}, comparable to BGO), is non-hygroscopic, and has a higher light output than BGO (32 photons/keV γ), in addition to being rather fast (41 ns decay time versus 300 ns for BGO).

A disadvantage of some inorganic crystals, e.g., NaI, is their hygroscopicity, a property which requires them to be housed in an airtight container to protect them from moisture. CsI(Tl) and BaF_{2} are only slightly hygroscopic and do not usually need protection. CsF, NaI(Tl), LaCl_{3}(Ce), LaBr_{3}(Ce) are hygroscopic, while BGO, CaF_{2}(Eu), LYSO, and YAG(Ce) are not.

Inorganic crystals can be cut to small sizes and arranged in an array configuration so as to provide position sensitivity. Such arrays are often used in medical physics or security applications to detect X-rays or γ rays: high-Z, high density materials (e.g. LYSO, BGO) are typically preferred for this type of applications.

Scintillation in inorganic crystals is typically slower than in organic ones, ranging typically from 1.48 ns for ZnO(Ga) to 9000 ns for CaWO_{4}. Exceptions are CsF (~5 ns), fast BaF_{2} (0.7 ns; the slow component is at 630 ns), as well as the newer products (LaCl_{3}(Ce), 28 ns; LaBr_{3}(Ce), 16 ns; LYSO, 41 ns).

For the imaging application, one of the advantage of inorganic crystals is very high light yield. Some high light yield scintillators above 100,000 photons/MeV at 662 keV are very recently reported for LuI_{3}(Ce), SrI_{2}(Eu), and Cs_{2}HfCl_{6}.

Many semiconductor scintillator phosphors are known, such as ZnS(Ag) (mentioned in the history section), CdS(Ag), ZnO(Zn), ZnO(Ga), CdS(In), ZnSe(O), and ZnTe(O), but none of these are available as single crystals. CdS(Te) and ZnSe(Te) have been commercially available in single crystal form, but their luminosity is partially quenched at room temperature.

GaAs(Si,B) is a recently discovered cryogenic semiconductor scintillator with high light output in the infra-red and apparently no afterglow. In combination with ultra-low noise cryogenic photodetectors it is the target in experiments to detect rare, low-energy electronic excitations from interacting dark matter.

=== Gaseous scintillators ===
Gaseous scintillators consist of nitrogen and the noble gases helium, argon, krypton, and xenon, with helium and xenon receiving the most attention. The scintillation process is due to the de-excitation of single atoms excited by the passage of an incoming particle. This de-excitation is very rapid (~1 ns), so the detector response is quite fast. Coating the walls of the container with a wavelength shifter is generally necessary as those gases typically emit in the ultraviolet and PMTs respond better to the visible blue-green region. In nuclear physics, gaseous detectors have been used to detect fission fragments or heavy charged particles.

=== Glasses ===
The most common glass scintillators are cerium-activated lithium or boron silicates. Since both lithium and boron have large neutron cross-sections, glass detectors are particularly well suited to the detection of thermal (slow) neutrons. Lithium is more widely used than boron since it has a greater energy release on capturing a neutron and therefore greater light output. Glass scintillators are however sensitive to electrons and γ rays as well (pulse height discrimination can be used for particle identification). Being very robust, they are also well-suited to harsh environmental conditions. Their response time is ≈10 ns, their light output is however low, typically ≈30% of that of anthracene.

=== Solution-based perovskite scintillators ===
Scintillation properties of organic-inorganic methylamonium (MA) lead halide perovskites under proton irradiation were first reported by Shibuya et al. in 2002 and the first γ-ray pulse height spectrum, although still with poor energy resolution, was reported on ((C_{6}H_{5}(CH_{2})_{2}NH_{3})_{2}PbBr_{4}) by van Eijk et al. in 2008 . Birowosuto at al. studied the scintillation properties of 3-D and 2-D layered perovskites under X-ray excitation. MAPbBr_{3} (CH_{3}NH_{3}PbBr_{3}) emits at 550 nm and MAPbI_{3} (CH_{3}NH_{3}PbI_{3}) at 750 nm which is attributed to exciton emission near the band gap of the compounds. In this first generation of Pb-halide perovskites the emission is strongly quenched at room temperature and less than 1 000 ph/MeV survive. At 10 K however intense emission is observed and write about yields up to 200 000 ph/MeV. The quenching is attributed to the small e-h binding energy in the exciton that decreases for Cl to Br to I . Interestingly one may replace the organic MA group with Cs+ to obtain full inorganic CsPbX_{3} halide perovskites. Depending on the Cl, Br, I content the triplet X-ray excited exciton emission can be tuned from 430 nm to 700 nm . One may also dilute Cs with Rb to obtain similar tuning.

Above very recent developments demonstrate that the organic-inorganic and all inorganic Pb-halide perovskites have various scintillation properties; however, the recent two-dimensional perovskite single crystals with light yields between 10 000 and 40 000 ph/MeV and decay times below 10 ns at room temperature may have much larger Stokes shift up to 200 nm in comparison with CsPbBr_{3} quantum dot scintillators.This is essential to prevent self reabsorption for scintillators.

More recently, a new material class first reported by Professor Biwu Ma's research group, called 0D organic metal halide hybrid (OMHH), an extension of the perovskite materials. This class of materials exhibits strong exciton binding of hundreds of meV, resulting in their high photoluminescent quantum efficiency of almost unity. Their large stoke shift and reabsorption-free properties make them desirable. Their potential applications for scintillators have been reported by the same group, and others. In 2020,(C38H34P2)MnBr4 was reported to have a light yield up to 80 000 Photon/MeV despite its low Z compared to traditional all inorganic. Impressive light yields from other 0D OMHH have been reported. There is a great potential to realize new generation scintillators from this material class. However, they are limited by their relatively long response time in microseconds, which is an area of intense research.

== Physics of scintillation ==
=== Organic scintillators ===
Transitions made by the free valence electrons of the molecules are responsible for the production of scintillation light in organic crystals. These electrons are associated with the whole molecule rather than any particular atom and occupy the so-called -molecular orbitals. The ground state S_{0} is a singlet state above which are the excited singlet states (S^{*}, S^{**}, ...), the lowest triplet state (T_{0}), and its excited levels (T^{*}, T^{**}, ...). A fine structure corresponding to molecular vibrational modes is associated with each of those electron levels. The energy spacing between electron levels is ≈1 eV; the spacing between the vibrational levels is about 1/10 of that for electron levels.

An incoming particle can excite either an electron level or a vibrational level. The singlet excitations immediately decay (< 10 ps) to the S^{*} state without the emission of radiation (internal degradation). The S^{*} state then decays to the ground state S_{0} (typically to one of the vibrational levels above S_{0}) by emitting a scintillation photon. This is the prompt component or fluorescence. The transparency of the scintillator to the emitted photon is due to the fact that the energy of the photon is less than that required for an S_{0} → S^{*} transition (the transition is usually being to a vibrational level above S_{0}).

When one of the triplet states gets excited, it immediately decays to the T_{0} state with no emission of radiation (internal degradation). Since the T_{0} → S_{0} transition is very improbable, the T_{0} state instead decays by interacting with another T_{0} molecule:

$$T_0 + T_0 \rightarrow S^{*} + S_0 + \text{photons}$$

and leaves one of the molecules in the S^{*} state, which then decays to S_{0} with the release of a scintillation photon. Since the T_{0}-T_{0} interaction takes time, the scintillation light is delayed: this is the slow or delayed component (corresponding to delayed fluorescence). Sometimes, a direct T_{0} → S_{0} transition occurs (also delayed), and corresponds to the phenomenon of phosphorescence. Note that the observational difference between delayed-fluorescence and phosphorescence is the difference in the wavelengths of the emitted optical photon in an S^{*} → S_{0} transition versus a T_{0} → S_{0} transition.

Organic scintillators can be dissolved in an organic solvent to form either a liquid or plastic scintillator. The scintillation process is the same as described for organic crystals (above); what differs is the mechanism of energy absorption: energy is first absorbed by the solvent, then passed onto the scintillation solute (the details of the transfer are not clearly understood).

=== Inorganic scintillators ===
The scintillation process in inorganic materials is due to the electronic band structure found in crystals and is not molecular in nature as is the case with organic scintillators. An incoming particle can excite an electron from the valence band to either the conduction band or the exciton band (located just below the conduction band and separated from the valence band by an energy gap; see picture). This leaves an associated hole behind, in the valence band. Impurities create electronic levels in the forbidden gap. The excitons are loosely bound electron-hole pairs which wander through the crystal lattice until they are captured as a whole by impurity centers.

The latter then rapidly de-excite by emitting scintillation light (fast component). The activator impurities are typically chosen so that the emitted light is in the visible range or near-UV where photomultipliers are effective. The holes associated with electrons in the conduction band are independent from the latter. Those holes and electrons are captured successively by impurity centers exciting certain metastable states not accessible to the excitons. The delayed de-excitation of those metastable impurity states again results in scintillation light (slow component).

BGO (bismuth germanium oxide) is a pure inorganic scintillator without any activator impurity. There, the scintillation process is due to an optical transition of the Bi^{3+} ion, a major constituent of the crystal. In tungstate scintillators CaWO_{4} and CdWO_{4} the emission is due to radiative decay of self-trapped excitons.

The scintillation process in GaAs doped with silicon and boron impurities is different from conventional scintillators in that the silicon n-type doping provides a built-in population of delocalized electrons at the bottom of the conduction band. Some of the boron impurity atoms reside on arsenic sites and serve as acceptors. A scintillation photon is produced whenever an acceptor atom such as boron captures an ionization hole from the valence band and that hole recombines radiatively with one of the delocalized electrons.

Unlike many other semiconductors, the delocalized electrons provided by the silicon are not "frozen out" at cryogenic temperatures. Above the Mott transition concentration of 8×10^{15} free carriers per cm^{3}, the "metallic" state is maintained at cryogenic temperatures because mutual repulsion drives any additional electrons into the next higher available energy level, which is in the conduction band. The spectrum of photons from this process is centered at 930 nm (1.33 eV) and there are three other emission bands centered at 860, 1070, and 1335 nm from other minor processes. Each of these emission bands has a different luminosity and decay time. The high scintillation luminosity is surprising because (1) with a refractive index of about 3.5, escape is inhibited by total internal reflection and (2) experiments at 90K report narrow-beam infrared absorption coefficients of several per cm.

Recent Monte Carlo and Feynman path integral calculations have shown that the high luminosity could be explained if most of the narrow beam absorption is actually a novel optical scattering from the conduction electrons with a cross section of about 5 × 10^{−18} cm^{2} that allows scintillation photons to escape total internal reflection. This cross section is about 10^{7} times larger than Thomson scattering but comparable to the optical cross section of the conduction electrons in a metal mirror.

=== Gases ===
In gases, the scintillation process is due to the de-excitation of single atoms excited by the passage of an incoming particle (a very rapid process: ≈1 ns).

== Response to various radiations ==
=== Heavy ions ===
Scintillation counters are usually not ideal for the detection of heavy ions for three reasons:

1. The very high ionizing power of heavy ions induces quenching effects which result in a reduced light output (e.g. for equal energies, a proton will produce 1/4 to 1/2 the light of an electron, while alphas will produce only about 1/10 the light);
2. The high stopping power of the particles also results in a reduction of the fast component relative to the slow component, increasing detector dead-time;
3. Strong non-linearities are observed in the detector response especially at lower energies.

The reduction in light output is stronger for organics than for inorganic crystals. Therefore, where needed, inorganic crystals, e.g. CsI(Tl), ZnS(Ag) (typically used in thin sheets as α-particle monitors), CaF_{2}(Eu), should be preferred to organic materials. Typical applications are α-survey instruments, dosimetry instruments, and heavy ion dE/dx detectors. Gaseous scintillators have also been used in nuclear physics experiments.

=== Electrons ===
The detection efficiency for electrons is essentially 100% for most scintillators. But because electrons can make large angle scatterings (sometimes backscatterings), they can exit the detector without depositing their full energy in it. The back-scattering is a rapidly increasing function of the atomic number Z of the scintillator material. Organic scintillators, having a lower Z than inorganic crystals, are therefore best suited for the detection of low-energy (< 10 MeV) beta particles. The situation is different for high energy electrons: since they mostly lose their energy by bremsstrahlung at the higher energies, a higher-Z material is better suited for the detection of the bremsstrahlung photon and the production of the electromagnetic shower which it can induce.

=== Gamma rays ===
High-Z materials, e.g. inorganic crystals, are best suited for the detection of gamma rays. The three basic ways that a gamma ray interacts with matter are: the photoelectric effect, Compton scattering, and pair production. The photon is completely absorbed in photoelectric effect and pair production, while only partial energy is deposited in any given Compton scattering. The cross section for the photoelectric process is proportional to Z^{5}, that for pair production proportional to Z^{2}, whereas Compton scattering goes roughly as Z. A high-Z material therefore favors the former two processes, enabling the detection of the full energy of the gamma ray. If the gamma rays are at higher energies (>5 MeV), pair production dominates.

=== Neutrons ===
Since the neutron is not charged it does not interact via the Coulomb force and therefore does not ionize the scintillation material. It must first transfer some or all of its energy via the strong force to a charged atomic nucleus. The positively charged nucleus then produces ionization. Fast neutrons (generally >0.5 MeV) primarily rely on the recoil proton in (n,p) reactions; materials rich in hydrogen, e.g. plastic scintillators, are therefore best suited for their detection. Slow neutrons rely on nuclear reactions such as the (n,γ) or (n,α) reactions, to produce ionization. Their mean free path is therefore quite large unless the scintillator material contains nuclides having a high cross section for these nuclear reactions such as ^{6}Li or ^{10}B. Materials such as LiI(Eu) or glass silicates are therefore particularly well-suited for the detection of slow (thermal) neutrons.

== List of inorganic scintillators ==
The following is a list of commonly used inorganic crystals:

- BaF_{2} or barium fluoride: BaF_{2} contains a very fast and a slow component. The fast scintillation light is emitted in the UV band (220 nm) and has a 0.7 ns decay time (smallest decay time for any scintillator), while the slow scintillation light is emitted at longer wavelengths (310 nm) and has a 630 ns decay time. It is used for fast timing applications, as well as applications for which pulse shape discrimination is needed. The light yield of BaF_{2} is about 12 photons/keV. BaF_{2} is not hygroscopic.
- BGO or bismuth germanate: bismuth germanate has a higher stopping power, but a lower optical yield than NaI(Tl). It is often used in coincidence detectors for detecting back-to-back gamma rays emitted upon positron annihilation in positron emission tomography machines.
- CdWO_{4} or cadmium tungstate: a high density, high atomic number scintillator with a very long decay time (14 μs), and relatively high light output (about 1/3 of that of NaI(Tl)). CdWO_{4} is routinely used for X-ray detection (CT scanners). Having very little ^{228}Th and ^{226}Ra contamination, it is also suitable for low activity counting applications.
- CaF_{2}(Eu) or calcium fluoride doped with europium: The material is not hygroscopic, has a 940 ns decay time, and is relatively low-Z. The latter property makes it ideal for detection of low energy β particles because of low backscattering, but not very suitable for γ detection. Thin layers of CaF_{2}(Eu) have also been used with a thicker slab of NaI(Tl) to make phoswiches capable of discriminating between α, β, and γ particles.
- CaWO_{4} or calcium tungstate: exhibits long decay time 9 μs and short wavelength emission with maximum at 420 nm matching sensitivity curve of bi‑alkali PMT. The light yield and energy resolution of the scintillator (6.6% for ^{137}Cs) is comparable with that of CdWO_{4}.
- CsI: undoped cesium iodide emits predominantly at 315 nm, is only slightly hygroscopic, and has a very short decay time (16 ns), making it suitable for fast timing applications. The light output is quite low at room temperature, however, it significantly increases with cooling.
- CsI(Na) or cesium iodide doped with sodium: the crystal is less bright than CsI(Tl), but comparable in light output to NaI(Tl). The wavelength of maximum emission is at 420 nm, well matched to the photocathode sensitivity of bi‑alkali PMTs. It has a slightly shorter decay time than CsI(Tl) (630 ns versus 1000 ns for CsI(Tl)). CsI(Na) is hygroscopic and needs an airtight enclosure for protection against moisture.
- CsI(Tl) or cesium iodide doped with thallium: these crystals are one of the brightest scintillators. Its maximum wavelength of light emission is in the green region at 550 nm. CsI(Tl) is only slightly hygroscopic and does not usually require an airtight enclosure.
- GaAs or gallium arsenide (suitably doped with silicon and boron impurities) is a cryogenic n-type semiconductor scintillator with a low cryogenic bandgap (1.52 eV) and high light output (100 photons/keV) in the infra-red (930 nm). The absence of thermally stimulated luminescence is evidence for the absence of afterglow, which makes it attractive for detecting rare, low energy electronic excitations from interacting dark matter. Large (5 kg) high-quality crystals are commercially grown for electronic applications.
- Gd_{2}O_{2}S or gadolinium oxysulfide has a high stopping power due to its relatively high density (7.32 g/cm^{3}) and the high atomic number of gadolinium. The light output is also good, making it useful as a scintillator for x-ray imaging applications.
- LaBr_{3}(Ce) (or lanthanum bromide doped with cerium): a better (novel) alternative to NaI(Tl); denser, more efficient, much faster (having a decay time about ~20ns), offers superior energy resolution due to its very high light output. Moreover, the light output is very stable and quite high over a very wide range of temperatures, making it particularly attractive for high temperature applications. Depending on the application, the intrinsic activity of ^{138}La can be a disadvantage. LaBr_{3}(Ce) is very hygroscopic.
- LaCl_{3}(Ce) (or lanthanum chloride doped with cerium): very fast, high light output. LaCl_{3}(Ce) is a cheaper alternative to LaBr_{3}(Ce). It is also quite hygroscopic.
- PbWO_{4} or lead tungstate: due to its high-Z, PbWO_{4} is suitable for applications where a high stopping power is required (e.g. γ ray detection).
- LuI_{3} or lutetium iodide.
- LSO or lutetium oxyorthosilicate (Lu_{2}SiO_{5}): used in positron emission tomography because it exhibits properties similar to bismuth germanate (BGO), but with a higher light yield. Its only disadvantage is the intrinsic background from the beta decay of natural ^{176}Lu.
- LYSO (Lu_{1.8}Y_{0.2}SiO_{5}(Ce)): comparable in density to BGO, but much faster and with much higher light output; excellent for medical imaging applications. LYSO is non-hygroscopic.
- NaI(Tl) or sodium iodide doped with thallium: NaI(Tl) is by far the most widely used scintillator material. It is available in single crystal form or the more rugged polycrystalline form (used in high vibration environments, e.g. wireline logging in the oil industry). Other applications include nuclear medicine, basic research, environmental monitoring, and aerial surveys. NaI(Tl) is very hygroscopic and needs to be housed in an airtight enclosure.
- YAG(Ce) or yttrium aluminum garnet: YAG(Ce) is non-hygroscopic. The wavelength of maximum emission is at 550 nm, well-matched to red-resistive PMTs or photo-diodes. It is relatively fast (70 ns decay time). Its light output is about 1/3 of that of NaI(Tl). The material exhibits some properties that make it particularly attractive for electron microscopy applications (e.g. high electron conversion efficiency, good resolution, mechanical ruggedness and long lifetime).
- ZnS(Ag) or zinc sulfide: ZnS(Ag) is one of the older inorganic scintillators (the first experiment making use of a scintillator by Sir William Crookes (1903) involved a ZnS screen). It is only available as a polycrystalline powder, however. Its use is therefore limited to thin screens used primarily for α particle detection.
- ZnWO_{4} or zinc tungstate is similar to CdWO_{4} scintillator exhibiting long decay constant 25 μs and slightly lower light yield.

== See also ==
- Gamma spectroscopy
- Liquid scintillation counting
- Scintillation counter
- Scintillating bolometer
- Neutron detection
- Total absorption spectroscopy

== Sources ==
- Aozhen, X.; Hettiarachchi, C.; Witkowski, M.; Drozdowski, W.; Birowosuto, M. D.; Wang, H.; Dang, C. (2018). "Thermal Quenching and Dose Studies of X-ray Luminescence in Single Crystals of Halide Perovskites". The Journal of Physical Chemistry C. 122 (28): 16265–16273. doi:10.1021/acs.jpcc.8b03622. S2CID 103801315.
- Birowosuto, M. D.; Cortecchia, D.; Drozdowski, W.; Brylew, K.; Lachmanski, W.; Bruno, A.; Soci, C. (2016). "X-ray Scintillation in Lead Halide Perovskite Crystals". Scientific Reports. 6 (1) 37254. arXiv:1611.05862. Bibcode:2016NatSR...637254B. doi:10.1038/srep37254. PMC 5111063. PMID 27849019.
- Chen, Quishui (2018). "All-inorganic perovskite nanocrystal scintillators". Nature. 561 (7721): 88–93. Bibcode:2018Natur.561...88C. doi:10.1038/s41586-018-0451-1. PMID 30150772. S2CID 52096794.
- Duclos, Steven J. (1998). "Scintillator Phosphors for Medical Imaging" (PDF). The Electrochemical Society Interface. 7 (2): 34–39. doi:10.1149/2.F07982IF. ISSN 1944-8783. S2CID 125268222.
- Dyer, Stephen A. (2001). Survey of Instrumentation and Measurement. Wiley-Blackwell. ISBN 978-0-471-39484-6.
- He, Qingquan; Zhou, Chenkun; Xu, Liangjin; Lee, Sujin; Lin, Xinsong; Neu, Jennifer; Worku, Michael; Chaaban, Maya; Ma, Biwu (1 June 2020). "Highly Stable Organic Antimony Halide Crystals for X-ray Scintillation". ACS Materials Letters. 2 (6): 633–638. Bibcode:2020ACSML...2..633H. doi:10.1021/acsmaterialslett.0c00133. S2CID 219027416.
- Guo, Jimei; Bücherl, Thomas; Zou, Yubin; Guo, Zhiyu; Tang, Guoyou (2009). "Comparison of the performance of different converters for neutron radiography and tomography using fission neutrons". Nuclear Instruments and Methods in Physics Research Section A. 605 (1–2): 69–72. Bibcode:2009NIMPA.605...69G. doi:10.1016/j.nima.2009.01.129.
- Knoll, Glenn F. (2010). Radiation detection and measurement (4th ed.). Wiley. ISBN 978-0-470-13148-0.
- Leo, William R. (1994). Techniques for Nuclear and Particle Physics Experiments (2nd ed.). Springer. doi:10.1007/978-3-642-57920-2. ISBN 978-3-540-57280-0.
- Liakos, John K. (2011). "Gamma-Ray-Driven Photovoltaic Cells via a Scintillator Interface". Journal of Nuclear Science and Technology. 48 (12): 1428–1436. Bibcode:2011JNST...48.1428L. doi:10.1080/18811248.2011.9711836. S2CID 98136174.
- Mikhailik, V. B.; Kraus, H. (2010). "Scintillators for cryogenic applications; state-of-art". Journal of Physical Studies. 14 (4): 4201–4206. doi:10.30970/jps.14.4201. S2CID 251315071.
- Mikhailik, V.; Kapustyanyk, V.; Tsybulskyi, V.; Rudyk, V.; Kraus, H. (2015). "Luminescence and scintillation properties of CsI: A potential cryogenic scintillator". Physica Status Solidi B. 252 (4): 804–810. arXiv:1411.6246. Bibcode:2015PSSBR.252..804M. doi:10.1002/pssb.201451464. S2CID 118668972.
- Mykhaylyk, V.; Wagner, A.; Kraus, H. (2017). "Non-contact luminescence lifetime cryothermometry for macromolecular crystallography". Journal of Synchrotron Radiation. 24 (3): 636–645. arXiv:1703.02448. Bibcode:2017JSynR..24..636M. doi:10.1107/S1600577517003484. PMC 5477482. PMID 28452755.
- L'Annunziata, Michael (2012). Handbook of Radioactivity Analysis (3rd ed.). Academic. ISBN 978-0-12-384873-4.
- Moser, S. W.; Harder, W. F.; Hurlbut, C. R.; Kusner, M. R. (1993). "Principles and Practice of Plastic Scintillator Design". Radiation Physics and Chemistry. 41 (1–2): 31–36. Bibcode:1993RaPC...41...31M. doi:10.1016/0969-806X(93)90039-W.
- Moszyński, M.; Balcerzyk, M.; Czarnacki, W.; Nassalski, A.; Szczęśniak, T.; Kraus, H.; Mikhailik, V. B.; Solskii, I. M. (2005). "Characterization of CaWO_{4} scintillator at room and liquid nitrogen temperatures". Nuclear Instruments and Methods in Physics Research Section A. 553 (2): 578–591. Bibcode:2005NIMPA.553..578M. doi:10.1016/j.nima.2005.07.052.
- Nakamura, H.; Shirakawa, Y.; Takahashi, S.; Shimizu, H. (2011). "Evidence of deep-blue photon emission at high efficiency by common plastic". EPL. 95 (2) 22001. Bibcode:2011EL.....9522001N. doi:10.1209/0295-5075/95/22001. hdl:2433/141973. S2CID 55710210.
- Salimgareeva, V. N.; Kolesov, S. V. (2005). "Plastic Scintillators Based on Polymethyl Methacrylate: A Review". Instruments and Experimental Techniques. 48 (3): 273–282. Bibcode:2005IET....48..273S. doi:10.1007/s10786-005-0052-8. S2CID 119475427.
- Shibuya, K; Koshimizu, M; Takeoka, Y; Asai, K (2002). "Scintillation properties of (C_{6}H_{13}NH_{3})_{2}PbI_{4}: Exciton luminescence of an organic/inorganic multiple quantum well structure compound". Nuclear Instruments and Methods in Physics Research A. 194 (2): 207–212. doi:10.1016/S0168-583X(02)00671-7.
- Sun, Siqi; Lu, Min; Gao, Xupeng; Shi, Zhifeng; Bai, Xue; Yu, William W.; Zhang, Yu (24 October 2021). "0D Perovskites: Unique Properties, Synthesis, and Their Applications". Advanced Science. 8 (24) 2102689. Bibcode:2021AdvSc...802689S. doi:10.1002/advs.202102689. PMC 8693037. PMID 34693663.
- van Eijk, Carel; de Haas, Johan T. M.; Rodnyi, Piotr; Khodyuk, Ivan; Shibuya, Kengo; Nishikido, Fumihiko; Koshimizu, Masanori (2008). "Scintillation properties of a crystal of (C_{6}H_{5}(CH_{2})_{2}NH_{3})_{2}PBBR_{4}". 2008 IEEE Nuclear Science Symposium Conference Record. Vol. N69. pp. 3525–3528. doi:10.1109/NSSMIC.2008.4775096. ISBN 978-1-4244-2714-7. S2CID 43279318.
- Xu, Liang-Jin; Lin, Xinsong; He, Qingquan; Worku, Michael; Ma, Biwu (28 August 2020). "Highly efficient eco-friendly X-ray scintillators based on an organic manganese halide". Nature Communications. 11 (1): 4329. Bibcode:2020NatCo..11.4329X. doi:10.1038/s41467-020-18119-y. PMC 7455565. PMID 32859920. S2CID 221366833.
