= Zinc tungstate =

Names
- Other names Zinc tungsten oxide

Identifiers
CAS Number	13597-56-3
ECHA InfoCard	100.033.670
EC Number	237-053-6
PubChem CID	22022519

Properties
Chemical formula	ZnWO_{4}
Molar mass	313.22 g/mol
Appearance	White crystalline solid
Density	7.87 g/cm^{3}
Melting point	1,200 °C (2,190 °F; 1,470 K)
Solubility in water	Practically insoluble in water
Refractive index (n_{D})	2.1–2.2

Structure
Crystal structure	Monoclinic, wolframite type
Space group	P2/c, No. 13
- Except where otherwise noted, data are given for materials in their standard state (at 25 °C [77 °F], 100 kPa). Infobox references

Zinc tungstate is an inorganic compound with the chemical formula ZnWO_{4}. It is a white crystalline solid that is practically insoluble in water. It occurs naturally as the zinc-rich mineral sanmartinite and has been investigated as a scintillator, optical material and photocatalyst.

== Structure and properties ==
Zinc tungstate crystallizes in the monoclinic crystal system with the wolframite structure, in space group P2/c (No. 13). The structure consists of distorted ZnO_{6} and WO_{6} octahedra arranged in chains.

At pressures above approximately 30 GPa (300,000 bar), ZnWO_{4} undergoes a structural phase transition to a high-pressure phase related to the β-fergusonite structure.

ZnWO_{4} is a wide-bandgap semiconductor. Reported experimental and calculated band-gap values are generally around 3.5–4 eV, depending on preparation method and measurement technique. Its optical properties underlie its use in scintillation and photocatalysis.

== Occurrence ==
Zinc tungstate occurs naturally as sanmartinite, a member of the wolframite group. Natural sanmartinite commonly contains some iron and is generally written (Zn,Fe)WO_{4}.

Sanmartinite was first described in 1948 and is a valid, grandfathered mineral species.

== Preparation ==
Zinc tungstate can be prepared by precipitation from aqueous solutions of a soluble zinc salt and sodium tungstate. For example, zinc chloride reacts according to:

ZnCl_{2} + Na_{2}WO_{4} → ZnWO_{4}↓ + 2 NaCl

Zinc nitrate can be used in the same way.

Nanocrystalline ZnWO_{4} has also been prepared by hydrothermal, solvothermal, sonochemical and electrochemical methods.

== Applications ==
Single crystals of ZnWO_{4} are used as scintillator materials. They combine high density, good light yield and low intrinsic radioactivity, and have been studied for rare-event and low-background particle-detection experiments.

Zinc tungstate has also been widely investigated as a heterogeneous photocatalyst for degradation of organic contaminants in water. Doping and formation of heterojunctions with other semiconductors can extend its photoresponse and improve charge separation.

Other investigated uses include optical fibres, photoluminescent materials, humidity sensors and electrochemical devices.

== Reactions ==
At elevated temperature, zinc tungstate can react with rare-earth tungstates to form mixed zinc–rare-earth tungstates of the general composition ZnRE_{4}W_{3}O_{16} (RE = Y, Nd, Sm, Eu, Gd, Dy, Ho, Er or Lu).
