= Wavelength shifter =

A wavelength shifter is a photofluorescent material that absorbs higher frequency photons and emits lower frequency photons. The material absorbs one photon, and emits one or multiple lower-energy photons. The relaxation time of the excited molecule is usually in the order of nanoseconds.

== Applications ==
Wavelength shifters are often used in particle physics to collect scintillation or Cherenkov light in particle detectors. Materials, such as acrylic slaps or optical fibers, are typically either doped with wavelength-shifting molecules or coated with wavelength-shifting paint.

Wavelength-shifting technology is of particular interest for low-background supernova neutrino detectors such as IceCube, Super-Kamiokande or its successor Hyper-Kamiokande. Here, wavelength shifters offer two advantages: As these types of detectors are based on the emission of Cherenkov radiation from secondary particles traveling faster than the phase velocity of light in the medium from the neutrino interaction, absorbing more photons in the UV range and shifting them to the visible range detectable by conventional PMTs is beneficial. In addition, with wavelength shifters larger collection areas can be covered price-efficiently as compared to standard PMT-based sensors. An example of a sensor making use of wavelength-shifting technology is the Wavelength-shifting Optical Module (WOM) envisaged for an extension of the IceCube detector.

Furthermore, wavelength shifting materials can be used to increase the efficiency of a photovoltaic cell (solar cell) by changing one "too-high" energy photon into multiple "just-right" energy photons.

Besides the scientific application, wavelength shifters are sometimes used to achieve UV resistance of plastics instead of absorbers. Wavelength shifter are also used to shift UV light to the visible spectrum in Fluorescent lamps or LEDs, in most cases this is done with a Phosphor that can be considered a wavelength shifter with a long ($>1\,$ms) relaxation time.

== Chemical structure ==
Organic wavelength shifters usually contain one or more benzene-ring(s) (e.g. de:1,4-Bis(2-methylstyryl)benzol or p-Terphenyl) since the $\sigma_s$ and $\sigma_p$ bonds here are useful in the absorption/emission of the photon and the energy transport within the molecule. Modifications of the molecules allow in some cases the tuning of the acceptance and emission wavelength regime. The wavelength shift occurs due to the Franck–Condon principle, while excess energy is usually carried away in form of phonons.

Most organic wavelength shifters are planar molecules, causing a decrease in wavelength shifting efficiency when crystallized due to energy exchange between the molecules. Current research has also created 3 dimensional wavelength shifters that show the opposite effect since clustering together limits the energy that can be stored as rotational energy.

== Spectral characteristics ==
Wavelength shifter usually have many absorption and emission lines that are broad enough to create an absorption and emission spectrum. The separation between absorption and emission spectrum is defined by the so-called Stokes shift.
