= Polyvinyl toluene =

Synthetic polymer

Polyvinyltoluene (PVT, polyvinyl toluene) is a synthetic polymer of alkylbenzenes with a linear formula [CH_{2}CH(C_{6}H_{4}CH_{3})]_{n}. Commercial vinyl toluene is a mixture of methyl styrene isomers.

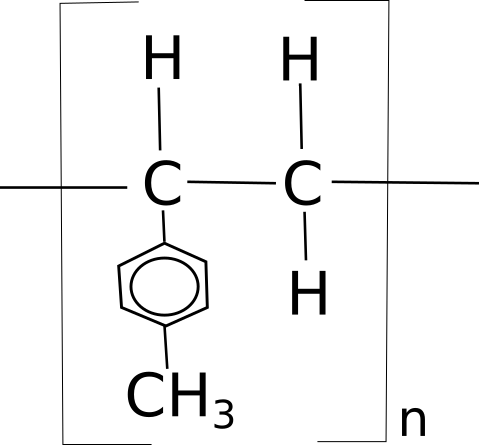
chemical formula for PVT

== Uses ==
PVT can be doped with anthracene or other wavelength-shifting dopants to produce a plastic scintillator. When subjected to ionizing radiation (both particle radiation and gamma radiation), the amount of visible radiation emitted is proportional to the absorbed dose as long as the energy loss per length is not too large. A relation applicable to a wide range of values for energy loss per unit length is given by Birks' law.

PVT can be damaged by radiation with high stopping power, e.g. ion beams or by any kind of ionizing radiation. A review of radiation damage for PVT and other similar plastic scintillators can be found in Instrumentation in High Energy Physics. Such radiation breaks the C-H bonds and creates color centers which absorb the produced light, significantly reducing the light output.

Following the increase in interest in Vinyl Records (as of 2022), PVT is being looked at as a replacement for PVC, the usual and historic material used to make Vinyl Records. PVT is considered more environmentally friendly than its older cousin PVC.
