= Tungsten oxide =

Tungsten has several oxidation states, and therefore oxides:

- Tungsten(III) oxide
- Tungsten(IV) oxide, also known as tungsten dioxide
- Tungsten(VI) oxide, also known as tungsten trioxide
- Tungsten pentoxide
