= Tungsten nitride =

Chemical compound of tungsten and nitrogen

Tungsten nitride (W_{2}N, WN, WN_{2}) is an inorganic compound, a nitride of tungsten. It is a hard, solid, brown-colored ceramic material that is electrically conductive and decomposes in water.

It is used in microelectronics as a contact material, for conductive layers, and barrier layers between silicon and other metals, e.g. tungsten or copper. It is less commonly used than titanium nitride or tungsten films.

Tungsten nitride forms together with tungsten dioxide, tungsten trioxide, and tungsten pentoxide when an incandescent light bulb breaks while the filament is heated.

Tungsten silicide is another material with similar use.

== High-pressure tungsten nitrides ==
In addition to the tungsten nitrides used industrially, two novel ultra-incompressible tungsten nitrides, W_{2}N_{3} and W_{3}N_{5}, were synthesized in 2024 through the direct reaction of tungsten with molecular nitrogen at 35 and 56 GPa respectively, in laser-heated diamond anvil cells. Their crystal structures were solved using synchrotron single-crystal X-ray diffraction: W_{2}N_{3} contains only discrete N^{3−} nitride anions, while W_{3}N_{5} also features N_{2}^{4−} pernitride dimers. Both compounds are built from WN_{7} polyhedra and have experimentally determined bulk moduli of 380 and 406 GPa respectively, qualifying them as ultra-incompressible. Density functional theory calculations found Vickers hardness values of 30 and 34 GPa for W_{2}N_{3} and W_{3}N_{5}, and predicted superconducting transition temperatures at ambient pressure of 11.6 K and 9.4 K; transport measurements on W_{2}N_{3} at 50 GPa showed a resistance drop consistent with superconductivity at 11.2 K, close to the calculated value. Both nitrides were found to be recoverable to ambient conditions and stable in air.
