= Nickel tungstate =

Names
- Other names Nickel(II) tungstate Nickel tungsten oxide

Identifiers
CAS Number	14177-51-6
3D model (JSmol)	Interactive image
ChemSpider	75997
ECHA InfoCard	100.034.560
EC Number	238-032-4
PubChem CID	84240
CompTox Dashboard (EPA)	DTXSID5065720
- InChI: InChI=1S/Ni.4O.W/q+2;;;2*-1; Key: QLTKZXWDJGMCAR-UHFFFAOYSA-N
- SMILES: [O-][W](=O)(=O)[O-].[Ni+2]

Properties
Chemical formula	NiWO_{4}
Molar mass	306.534
Appearance	green crystals
Odor	odourless
Density	3.3723 g/cm³
Melting point	1420 ˚C
Solubility in water	insoluble
Solubility	soluble in ammonia

Structure
Crystal structure	monoclinic crystal system

Hazards
- GHS labelling
Pictograms	(GHS07: Exclamation mark) (GHS08: Health hazard)
Signal word	Danger
Hazard statements	H317, H350i, H372
Precautionary statements	P201, P260, P280, P308+P313, P405, P501

Related compounds
Other anions	Nickel(II) chromate Nickel(II) molybdate
Other cations	Iron(II) tungstate Cobalt(II) tungstate Zinc(II) tungstate
- Except where otherwise noted, data are given for materials in their standard state (at 25 °C [77 °F], 100 kPa). Infobox references

Nickel tungstate is an inorganic compound of nickel, tungsten and oxygen, with the chemical formula of NiWO_{4}.

== Preparation ==
Nickel tungstate can be prepared by the reaction of nickel(II) nitrate and sodium tungstate:

Ni(NO_{3})_{2} + Na_{2}WO_{4} → NiWO_{4} + 2 NaNO_{3}

Nickel tungstate can also be prepared by the reaction of nickel(II) oxide and tungsten(VI) oxide.

It can also be obtained by the reaction of ammonium metatungstate and nickel(II) nitrate or from the reaction of sodium tungstate, nickel(II) chloride and sodium chloride.

Nickel tungstate undergoes a phase transition at 700 °C.

== Properties ==
Nickel tungstate is a light brown, odourless solid that is insoluble in water. The amorphous form is green and the polycrystalline form is brown. It crystallizes in the wolframite crystal structure of the monoclinic crystal system with space group P2/c (No. 13). The compound is antiferromagnetic.

== Applications ==
Nickel tungstate has no commercial uses. It has been examined as a photocatalyst, in humidity sensors, and in dielectric resonators. It is also considered as a "promising" cathode material for asymmetric supercapacitors.

== Other compounds ==
Nickel tungstate forms compounds with ammonia, such as NiWO_{4}·2NH_{3}·H_{2}O which are cyan crystals, NiWO_{4}·4NH_{3} which are green crystals, NiWO_{4}·5NH_{3}·H_{2}O as dark blue crystals or anhydrous NiWO_{4}·6NH_{3} which is crystalline purple, while the octahydrate of hexamine is dark blue.
