= Glass-to-metal seal =

Airtight seal which joins glass and metal surfaces

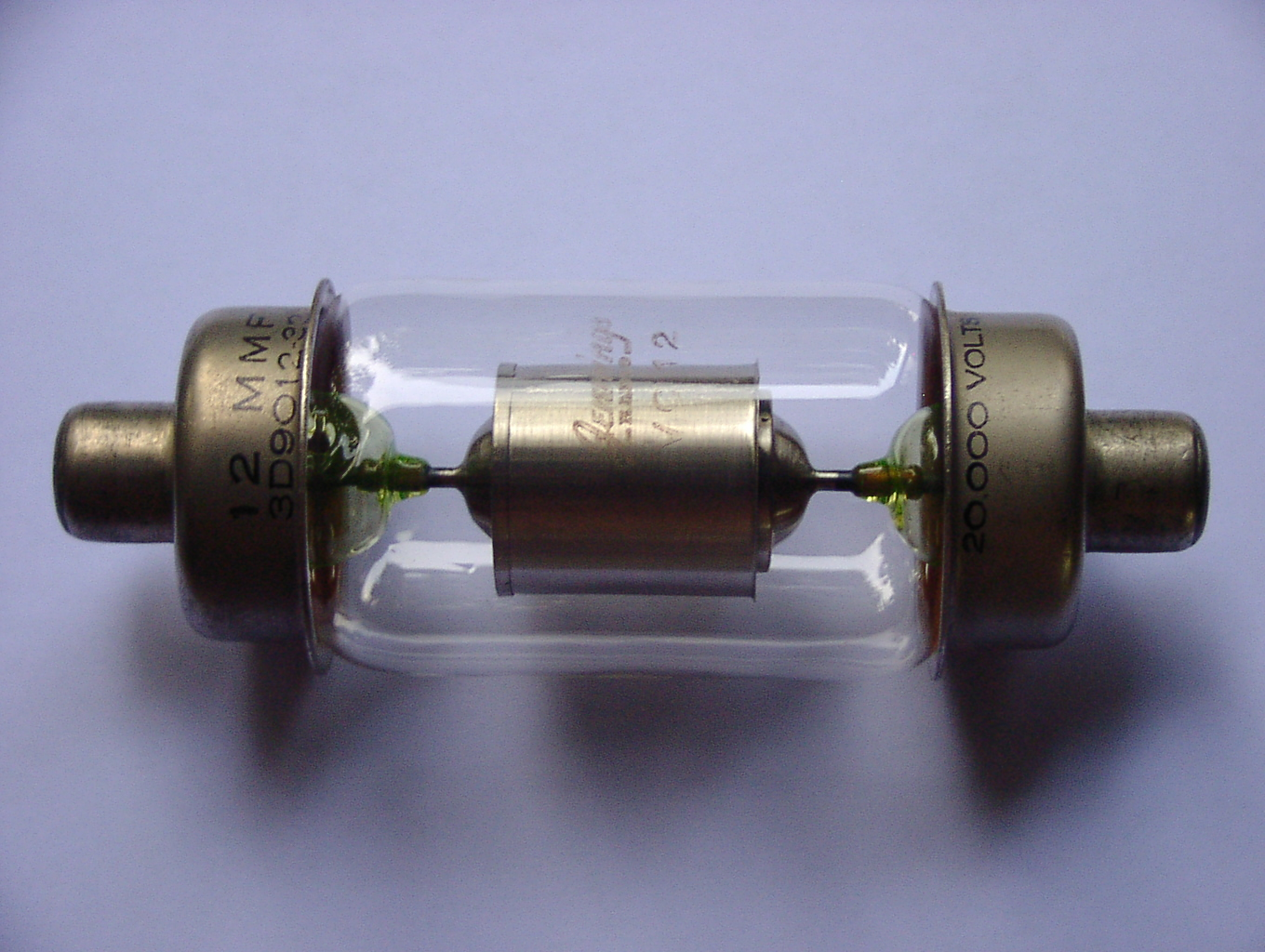
Uranium glass used as lead-in seals in a vacuum capacitor

Glass-to-metal seals are a type of mechanical seal which joins glass and metal surfaces. They are very important elements in the construction of vacuum tubes, electric discharge tubes, incandescent light bulbs, glass-encapsulated semiconductor diodes, reed switches, glass windows in metal cases, and metal or ceramic packages of electronic components.

Properly done, such a seal is hermetic (capable of supporting a vacuum, good electrical insulation, special optical properties e.g. UV lamps). To achieve such a seal, two properties must hold:

1. The molten glass must be capable of wetting the metal, in order to form a tight bond, and
2. The thermal expansion of the glass and metal must be closely matched so that the seal remains solid as the assembly cools.

Thinking for example about a metal wire in a glass bulb sealing, the metal glass contact can break if the coefficients of thermal expansion (CTE) are not well aligned. For the case that the CTE of the metal is larger than the CTE of the glass, the sealing shows a high probability to break upon cooling. By lowering the temperature, the metal wire shrinks more than the glass does, leading to a strong tensile force on the glass, which finally leads to breakage. On the other hand, if the CTE of the glass is larger than the CTE of the metal wire, the seal will tighten upon cooling since compression force is applied on the glass.

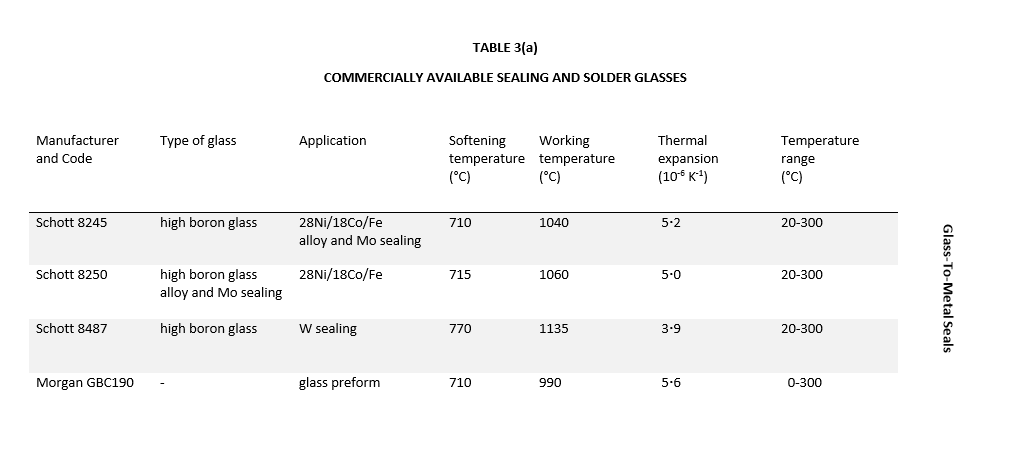
Commercially available sealing and solder glasses

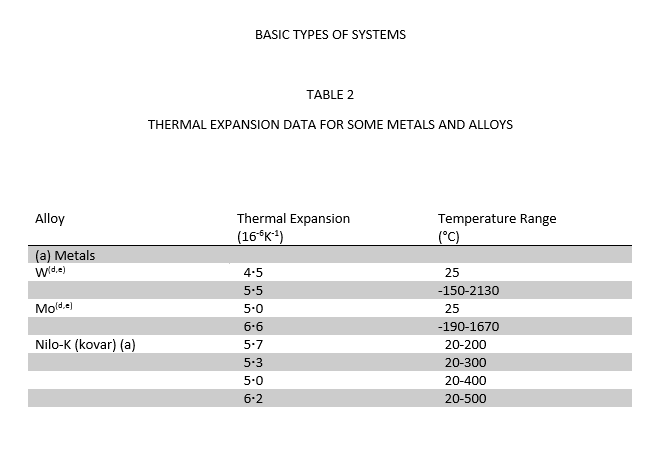
Thermal expansion data for some metals and alloys

According to all requirements that need to be fulfilled and the strong necessity to align the CTE of both materials, there are only a few companies offering specialty glass for glass-metal sealing, such as Schott AG and Morgan Advanced Materials.

== Glass-to-metal bonds ==
Glass and metal can bond together by purely mechanical means, which usually gives weaker joints, or by chemical interaction, where the oxide layer on the metal surface forms a strong bond with the glass (the glass itself is about 73% composed of a silicon dioxide (SiO_{2})) . The acid-base reactions are main causes of interaction between glass-metal in the presence of metal oxides on the surface of metal. After complete dissolution of the surface oxides into the glass, further progress of interaction depends on the oxygen activity at the interface. The oxygen activity can be increased by diffusion of molecular oxygen through some defects like cracks.

Also, reduction of the thermodynamically less stable components in the glass (and releasing the oxygen ions) can increase the oxygen activity at the interface. In other words, the redox reactions are main causes of interaction between glass-metal in the absence of metal oxides on the surface of metal.

For achieving a vacuum-tight seal, the seal must not contain bubbles. The bubbles are most commonly created by gases escaping the metal at high temperature; degassing the metal before its sealing is therefore important, especially for nickel and iron and their alloys. This is achieved by heating the metal in vacuum or sometimes in hydrogen atmosphere or in some cases even in air at temperatures above those used during the sealing process. Oxidizing of the metal surface also reduces gas evolution. Most of the evolved gas is produced due to the presence of carbon impurities in the metals; these can be removed by heating in hydrogen.

The glass-oxide bond is stronger than glass-metal. The oxide forms a layer on the metal surface, with the proportion of oxygen changing from zero in the metal to the stoichiometry of the oxide and the glass itself. A too-thick oxide layer tends to be porous on the surface and mechanically weak, flaking, compromising the bond strength and creating possible leakage paths along the metal-oxide interface. Proper thickness of the oxide layer is therefore critical.

=== Copper ===
Metallic copper does not bond well to glass. Copper(I) oxide, however, is wetted by molten glass and partially dissolves in it, forming a strong bond. The oxide also bonds well to the underlying metal. But copper(II) oxide causes weak joints that may leak and its formation must be prevented.

For bonding copper to glass, the surface needs to be properly oxidized. The oxide layer is to have the right thickness; too little oxide would not provide enough material for the glass to anchor to, too much oxide would cause the oxide layer to fail, and in both cases the joint would be weak and possibly non-hermetic. To improve the bonding to glass, the oxide layer should be borated; this is achieved by e.g. dipping the hot part into a concentrated solution of borax and then heating it again for certain time. This treatment stabilizes the oxide layer by forming a thin protective layer of sodium borate on its surface, so the oxide does not grow too thick during subsequent handling and joining. The layer should have uniform deep red to purple sheen. The boron oxide from the borated layer diffuses into glass and lowers its melting point. The oxidation occurs by oxygen diffusing through the molten borate layer and forming copper(I) oxide, while formation of copper(II) oxide is inhibited.

The copper-to-glass seal should look brilliant red, almost scarlet; pink, sherry and honey colors are also acceptable. Too thin an oxide layer appears light, up to the color of metallic copper, while too thick oxide looks too dark.

Oxygen-free copper has to be used if the metal comes in contact with hydrogen (e.g. in a hydrogen-filled tube or during handling in the flame). Normally, copper contains small inclusions of copper(I) oxide. Hydrogen diffuses through the metal and reacts with the oxide, reducing it to copper and yielding water. The water molecules however can not diffuse through the metal, are trapped in the location of the inclusion, and cause embrittlement.

As copper(I) oxide bonds well to the glass, it is often used for combined glass-metal devices. The ductility of copper can be used for compensation of the thermal expansion mismatch in e.g. the knife-edge seals. For wire feed throughs, dumet wire – nickel-iron alloy plated with copper – is frequently used. Its maximum diameter is however limited to about 0.5 mm due to its thermal expansion.

Copper can be sealed to glass without the oxide layer, but the resulting joint is less strong.

=== Platinum ===
Platinum has similar thermal expansion as glass and is well-wetted with molten glass. It however does not form oxides, so its bond strength is lower. The seal has metallic color and limited strength.

=== Gold ===
Like platinum, gold does not form oxides that could assist in bonding. Glass-gold bonds are therefore metallic in color and weak. Gold tends to be used for glass-metal seals only rarely. Special compositions of soda-lime glasses that match the thermal expansion of gold, containing tungsten trioxide and oxides of lanthanum, aluminum and zirconium, exist.

=== Silver ===
Silver forms a thin layer of silver oxide on its surface. This layer dissolves in molten glass and forms silver silicate, facilitating a strong bond.

=== Nickel ===
Nickel can bond with glass either as a metal, or via the nickel(II) oxide layer. The metal joint has metallic color and inferior strength. The oxide-layer joint has characteristic green-grey color. Nickel plating can be used in similar way as copper plating, to facilitate better bonding with the underlying metal.

=== Iron ===
Iron is only rarely used for feedthroughs, but frequently gets coated with vitreous enamel, where the interface is also a glass-metal bond. The bond strength is also governed by the character of the oxide layer on its surface. A presence of cobalt in the glass leads to a chemical reaction between the metallic iron and cobalt oxide, yielding iron oxide dissolved in glass and cobalt alloying with the iron and forming dendrites, growing into the glass and improving the bond strength.

Iron can not be directly sealed to lead glass, as it reacts with the lead oxide and reduces it to metallic lead. For sealing to lead glasses, it has to be copper-plated or an intermediate lead-free glass has to be used. Iron is prone to creating gas bubbles in glass due to the residual carbon impurities; these can be removed by heating in wet hydrogen. Plating with copper, nickel or chromium is also advised.

=== Chromium ===
Chromium is a highly reactive metal present in many iron alloys. Chromium may react with glass, reducing the silicon and forming crystals of chromium silicide growing into the glass and anchoring together the metal and glass, improving the bond strength.

=== Kovar ===
Kovar, an iron-nickel-cobalt alloy, has low thermal expansion similar to high-borosilicate glass and is frequently used for glass-metal seals especially for the application in x-ray tubes or glass lasers. It can bond to glass via the intermediate oxide layer of nickel(II) oxide and cobalt(II) oxide; the proportion of iron oxide is low due to its reduction with cobalt. The bond strength is highly dependent on the oxide layer thickness and character. The presence of cobalt makes the oxide layer easier to melt and dissolve in the molten glass. A grey, grey-blue or grey-brown color indicates a good seal. A metallic color indicates lack of oxide, while black color indicates overly oxidized metal, in both cases leading to a weak joint.

=== Molybdenum ===
Molybdenum bonds to the glass via the intermediate layer of molybdenum(IV) oxide. Due to its low thermal expansion coefficient, matched to glass, molybdenum, like tungsten, is often used for glass-metal bonds especially in conjunction with aluminium-silicate glass. Its high electrical conductivity makes it superior over nickel-cobalt-iron alloys. It is favored by the lighting industry as feedthroughs for lightbulbs and other devices. Molybdenum oxidizes much faster than tungsten and quickly develops a thick oxide layer that does not adhere well, its oxidation should be therefore limited to just yellowish or at most blue-green color. The oxide is volatile and evaporates as a white smoke above 700 °C; excess oxide can be removed by heating in inert gas (argon) at 1000 °C. Molybdenum strips are used instead of wires where higher currents (and higher cross-sections of the conductors) are needed.

=== Tungsten ===
Tungsten bonds to the glass via the intermediate layer of tungsten(VI) oxide. A properly formed bond has characteristic coppery/orange/brown-yellow color in lithium-free glasses; in lithium-containing glasses the bond is blue due to formation of lithium tungstate. Due to its low thermal expansion coefficient, matched to glass, tungsten is frequently used for glass-metal bonds. Tungsten forms satisfying bonds with glasses with similar thermal expansion coefficient such as high-borosilicate glass. The surface of both the metal and glass should be smooth, without scratches. Tungsten has the lowest expansion coefficient of metals and the highest melting point.

=== Stainless steel ===
304 Stainless steel forms bonds with glass via an intermediate layer of chromium(III) oxide and iron(III) oxide. Further reactions of chromium, forming chromium silicide dendrites, are possible. The thermal expansion coefficient of steel is however fairly different from the glass; like with copper, this can be alleviated by using knife-edge (Houskeeper) seals.

=== Zirconium ===
Zirconium wire can be sealed to glass with just little treatment – rubbing with abrasive paper and short heating in flame. Zirconium is used in applications demanding chemical resistance or lack of magnetism.

=== Titanium ===
Titanium, like zirconium, can be sealed to some glasses with just little treatment.

=== Indium ===
Indium and some of its alloys can be used as a solder capable of wetting glass, ceramics, and metals and joining them together. Indium has low melting point and is very soft; the softness allows it to deform plastically and absorb the stresses from thermal expansion mismatches. Due to its very low vapor pressure, indium finds use in glass-metal seals used in vacuum technology and cryogenic applications.

=== Gallium ===
Gallium is a soft metal with melting point at 30 °C. It readily wets glasses and most metals and can be used for seals that can be assembled/disassembled by just slight heating. It can be used as a liquid seal up to high temperatures or even at lower temperatures when alloyed with other metals (e.g. as galinstan).

=== Mercury ===
Mercury is a metal liquid at normal temperature and does not wet glass. It was used as the earliest glass-to-metal seal and is still in use for liquid seals for e.g. rotary shafts.

== Mercury seal ==
The first technological use of a glass-to-metal seal was the encapsulation of the vacuum in the barometer by Torricelli. The liquid mercury wets the glass and thus provides for a vacuum tight seal. Liquid mercury was also used to seal the metal leads of early mercury arc lamps into the fused silica bulbs.

A less toxic and more expensive alternative to mercury is gallium.

Mercury and gallium seals can be used for vacuum-sealing rotary shafts.

== Platinum wire seal ==
The next step was to use thin platinum wire. Platinum is easily wetted by glass and has a similar coefficient of thermal expansion as typical soda-lime and lead glass. It is also easy to work with because of its non-oxidibility and high melting point. This type of seal was used in scientific equipment throughout the 19th century and also in the early incandescent lamps and radio tubes.

== Dumet wire seal ==
In 1911 the Dumet-wire seal was invented which is still the common practice to seal copper leads through soda-lime or lead glass.

If copper is properly oxidised before it is wetted by molten glass a vacuum tight seal of good mechanical strength can be obtained. After copper is oxidized, it is often dipped in a borax solution, as borating the copper helps prevents over-oxidation when reintroduced to a flame. Simple copper wire is not usable because its CTE is much higher than that of the glass. Thus, on cooling a strong tensile force acts on the glass-to-metal interface and it breaks.

Glass and glass-to-metal interfaces are especially sensitive to tensile stress. Dumet-wire is a copper clad wire (25% of copper by weight) with a core of nickel-iron alloy 42 (42% of nickel by weight). The core having low CTE makes it possible to produce a wire with a radial CTE lower than a linear CTE of the glass, so that the glass-to-metal interface is under a low compression stress. It is not possible to adjust the axial thermal expansion of the wire as well. Because of the much higher mechanical strength of the nickel-iron core compared to the copper, the axial CTE the wire is about the same as of the core. Therefore, a shear stress builds up which is limited to a safe value by the low tensile strength of the copper. This is also the reason why Dumet is only useful for wire diameters lower than about 0.5 mm.

In a typical Dumet seal through the base of a vacuum tube a short piece of Dumet-wire is butt welded to a nickel wire at one end and a copper wire at the other end. When the base is pressed of lead glass the Dumet-wire and a short part of the nickel and the copper wire are enclosed in the glass. Then the nickel wire and the glass around the Dumet-wire are heated by a gas flame and the glass seals to the Dumet-wire.

The nickel and copper do not seal vacuum tight to the glass but are mechanically supported. The butt welding also avoids problems with gas-leakages at the interface between the core wire and the copper.

== Copper tube seal ==
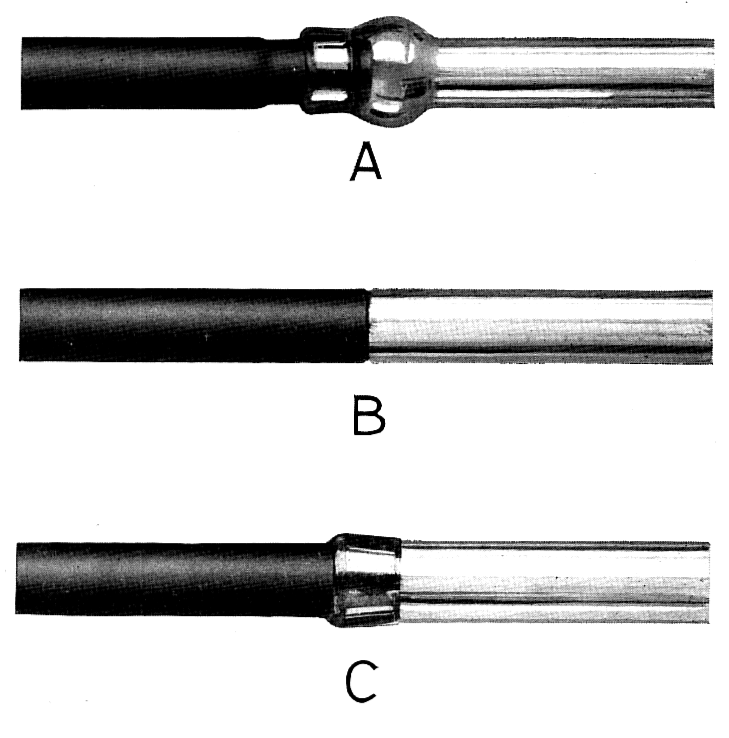
Three types of copper tube seals (from Bell System Technical Journal, 1922). In A, the edge of the copper is not in contact with the glass. In B and C, the copper is machined to a sharp knife edge in contact with the glass, with the glass either inside (B) or outside (C) of the copper.

Another possibility to avoid a strong tensile stress when sealing copper through glass is the use of a thin walled copper tube instead of a solid wire. Here a shear stress builds up in the glass-to-metal interface which is limited by the low tensile strength of the copper combined with a low tensile stress. The copper tube is insensitive to high electric current compared to a Dumet-seal because on heating the tensile stress converts into a compression stress which is again limited by the tensile strength of the copper. Also, it is possible to lead an additional solid copper wire through the copper tube. In a later variant, only a short section of the copper tube has a thin wall and the copper tube is hindered to shrink at cooling by a ceramic tube inside the copper tube.

If large parts of copper are to be fitted to glass like the water cooled copper anode of a high power radio transmitter tube or an x-ray tube historically the Houskeeper knife edge seal is used. Here the end of a copper tube is machined to a sharp knife edge, invented by O. Kruh in 1917. In the method described by W.G. Houskeeper the outside or the inside of the copper tube right to the knife edge is wetted with glass and connected to the glass tube. In later descriptions the knife edge is just wetted several millimeters deep with glass, usually deeper on the inside, and then connected to the glass tube.

If copper is sealed to glass, it is an advantage to get a thin bright red Cu_{2}O containing layer between copper and glass. This is done by borating. After W.J. Scott a copper plated tungsten wire is immersed for about 30 s in chromic acid and then washed thoroughly in running tap water. Then it is dipped into a saturated solution of borax and heated to bright red heat in the oxidizing part of a gas flame. Possibly followed by quenching in water and drying. Another method is to oxidize the copper slightly in a gas flame and then to dip it into borax solution and let it dry. The surface of the borated copper is black when hot and turns to dark wine red on cooling.

It is also possible to make a bright seal between copper and glass where it is possible to see the blank copper surface through the glass, but this gives less adherence than the seal with the red Cu_{2}O containing layer. If glass is melted on copper in a reducing hydrogen atmosphere the seal is extremely weak. If copper is to be heated in hydrogen-containing atmosphere e.g. a gas flame it needs to be oxygen-free to prevent hydrogen embrittlement. Copper which is meant to be used as an electrical conductor is not necessarily oxygen-free and contains particles of Cu_{2}O which react with hydrogen that diffuses into the copper to H_{2}O which cannot diffuse out-off the copper and thus causes embrittlement. The copper usually used in vacuum applications is of the very pure OFHC (oxygen-free-high-conductivity) quality which is both free of Cu_{2}O and deoxidising additives which might evaporate at high temperature in vacuum.

== Copper disc seal ==
In the copper disc seal, as proposed by W.G. Houskeeper, the end of a glass tube is closed by a round copper disc. An additional ring of glass on the opposite side of the disc increases the possible thickness of the disc to more than 0.3 mm. Best mechanical strength is obtained if both sides of the disc are fused to the same type of glass tube and both tubes are under vacuum. The disc seal is of special practical interest because it is a simple method to make a seal to low expansion borosilicate glass without the need of special tools or materials. The keys to success are proper borating, heating of the joint to a temperature as close to the melting point of the copper as possible and to slow down the cooling, at least by packing the assembly into glass wool while it is still red hot.

== Matched seal ==
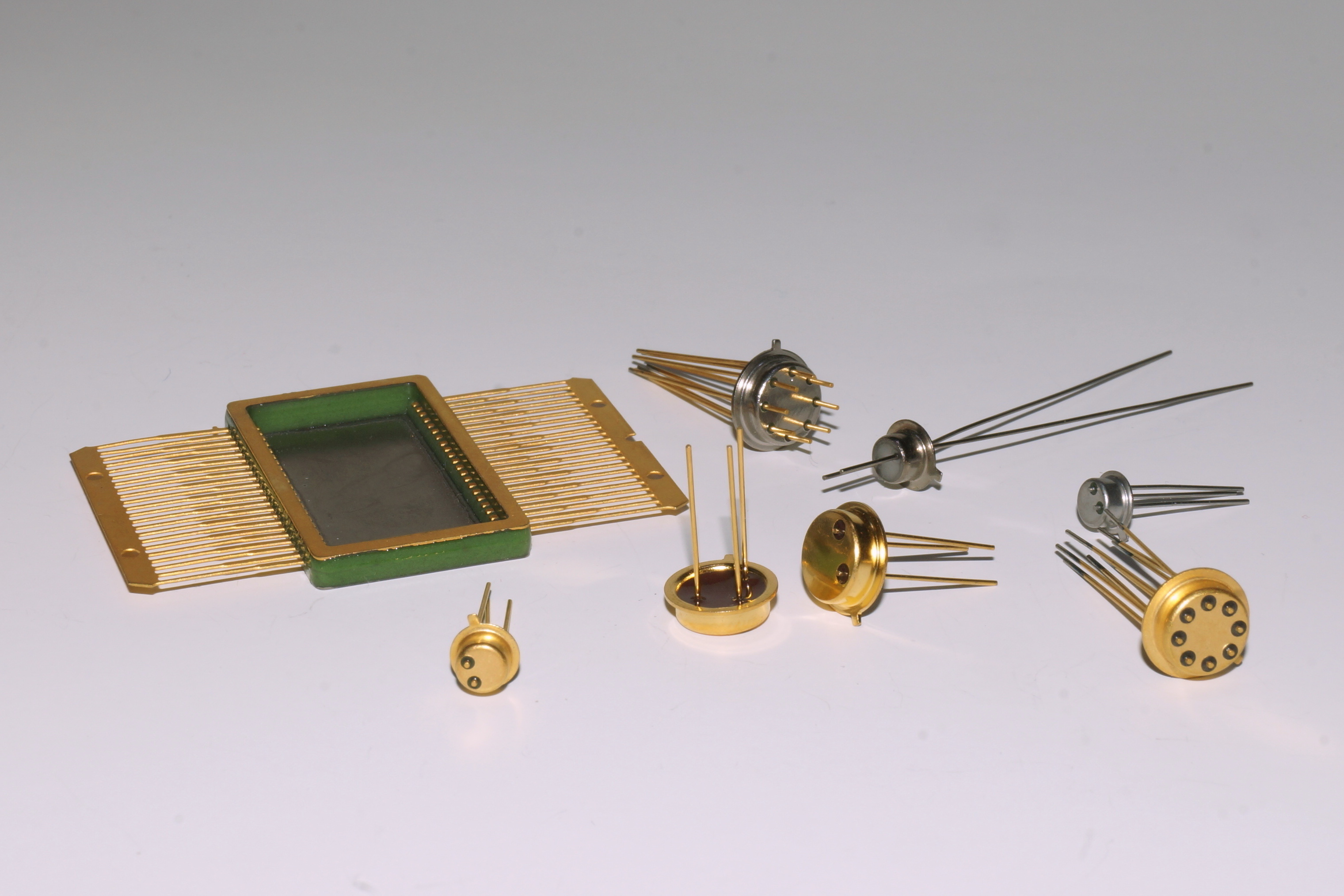
Matched glass-to-metal seals

In a matched seal the thermal expansion of metal and glass is matched. Copper-plated tungsten wire can be used to seal through borosilicate glass with a low coefficient of thermal expansion which is matched by tungsten. The tungsten is electrolytically copper plated and heated in hydrogen atmosphere to fill cracks in the tungsten and to get a proper surface to easily seal to glass. The borosilicate glass of usual laboratory glassware has a lower coefficient of thermal expansion than tungsten, thus it is necessary to use an intermediate sealing glass to get a stress-free seal.

There are combinations of glass and iron-nickel-cobalt alloys (Kovar) where even the non-linearity of the thermal expansion is matched. These alloys can be directly sealed to glass, but then the oxidation is critical. Also, their low electrical conductivity is a disadvantage. Thus, they are often gold plated. It is also possible to use silver plating, but then an additional gold layer is necessary as an oxygen diffusion barrier to prevent the formation of iron oxide.

While there are Fe-Ni alloys which match the thermal expansion of tungsten at room temperature, they are not useful to seal to glass because of a too strong increase of their thermal expansion at higher temperatures.

Reed switches use a matched seal between an iron-nickel alloy (NiFe 52) and a matched glass. The glass of reed switches is usually green due to its iron content because the sealing of reed switches is done by heating with infrared radiation and this glass shows a high absorption in the near infrared.

The electrical connections of high-pressure sodium vapour lamps, the light yellow lamps for street lighting, are made of niobium alloyed with 1% of zirconium.

Historically, some television cathode ray tubes were made by using ferric steel for the funnel and glass matched in expansion to ferric steel. The steel plate used had a diffusion layer enriched with chromium at the surface made by heating the steel together with chromium oxide in a HCl-containing atmosphere. In contrast to copper, pure iron does not bond strongly to silicate glass. Also, technical iron contains some carbon which forms bubbles of CO when it is sealed to glass under oxidizing conditions. Both are a major source of problems for the technical enamel coating of steel and make direct seals between iron and glass unsuitable for high vacuum applications. The oxide layer formed on chromium-containing steel can seal vacuum tight to glass and the chromium strongly reacts with carbon. Silver-plated iron was used in early microwave tubes.

It is possible to make matched seals between copper or austenitic steel and glass, but silicate glass with that high thermal expansion is especially fragile and has a low chemical durability.

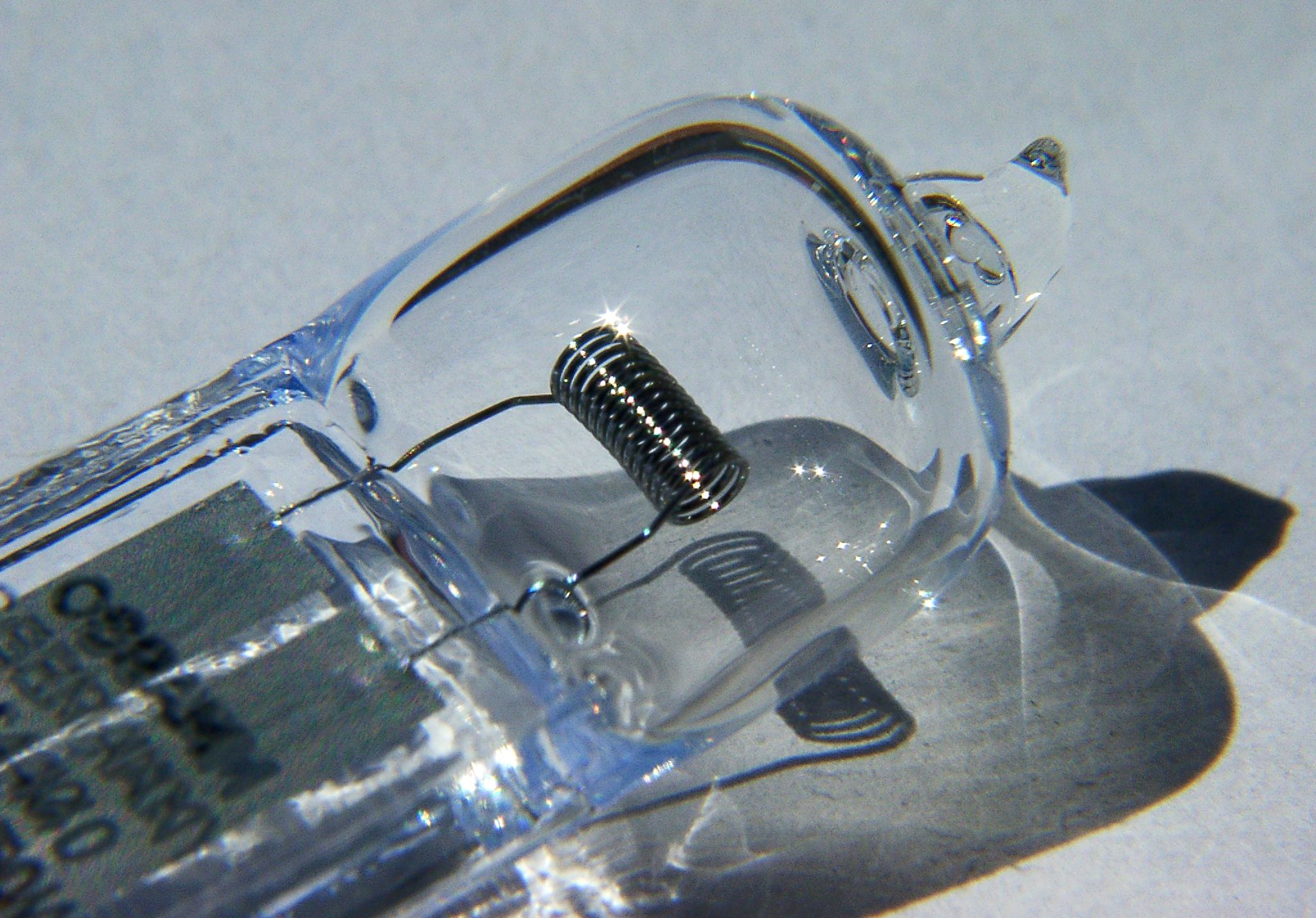
Halogen bulb with molybdenum foil seal

== Molybdenum foil seal ==
Another widely used method to seal through glass with low coefficient of thermal expansion is the use of strips of thin molybdenum foil. This can be done with matched coefficients of thermal expansion. Then the edges of the strip also have to be knife sharp. The disadvantage here is that the tip of the edge which is a local point of high tensile stress reaches through the wall of the glass container. This can lead to low gas leakages. In the tube to tube knife edge seal the edge is either outside, inside, or buried into the glass wall.

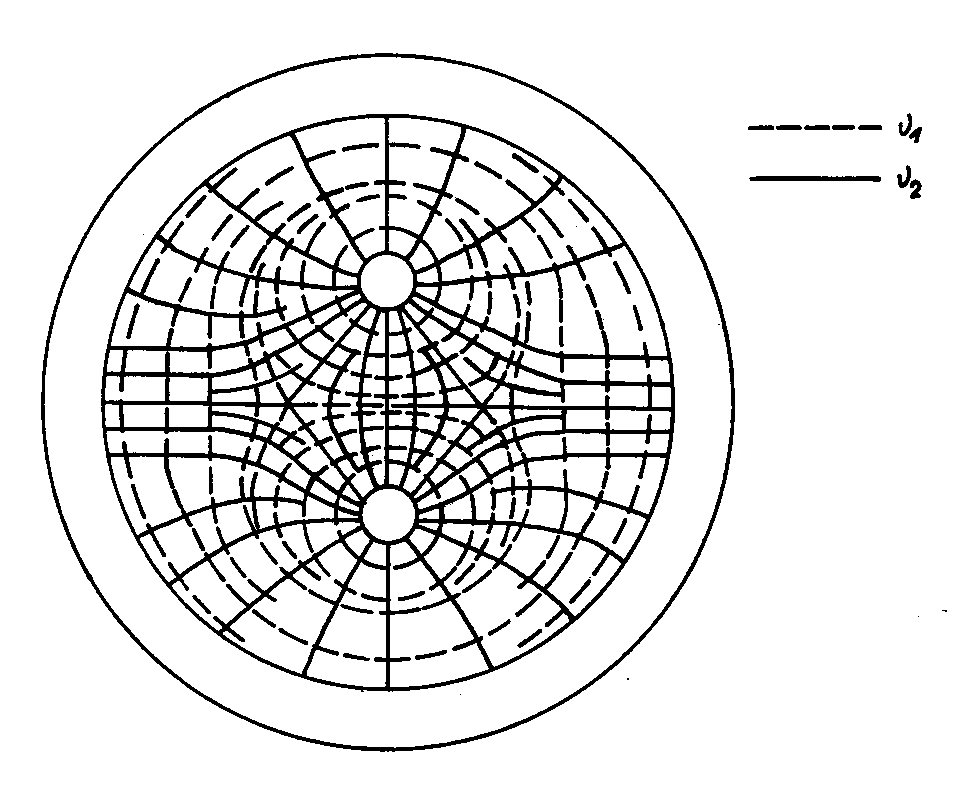
Stress trajectories in glass-to-metal compression seal with two metal leads

== Compression seal ==
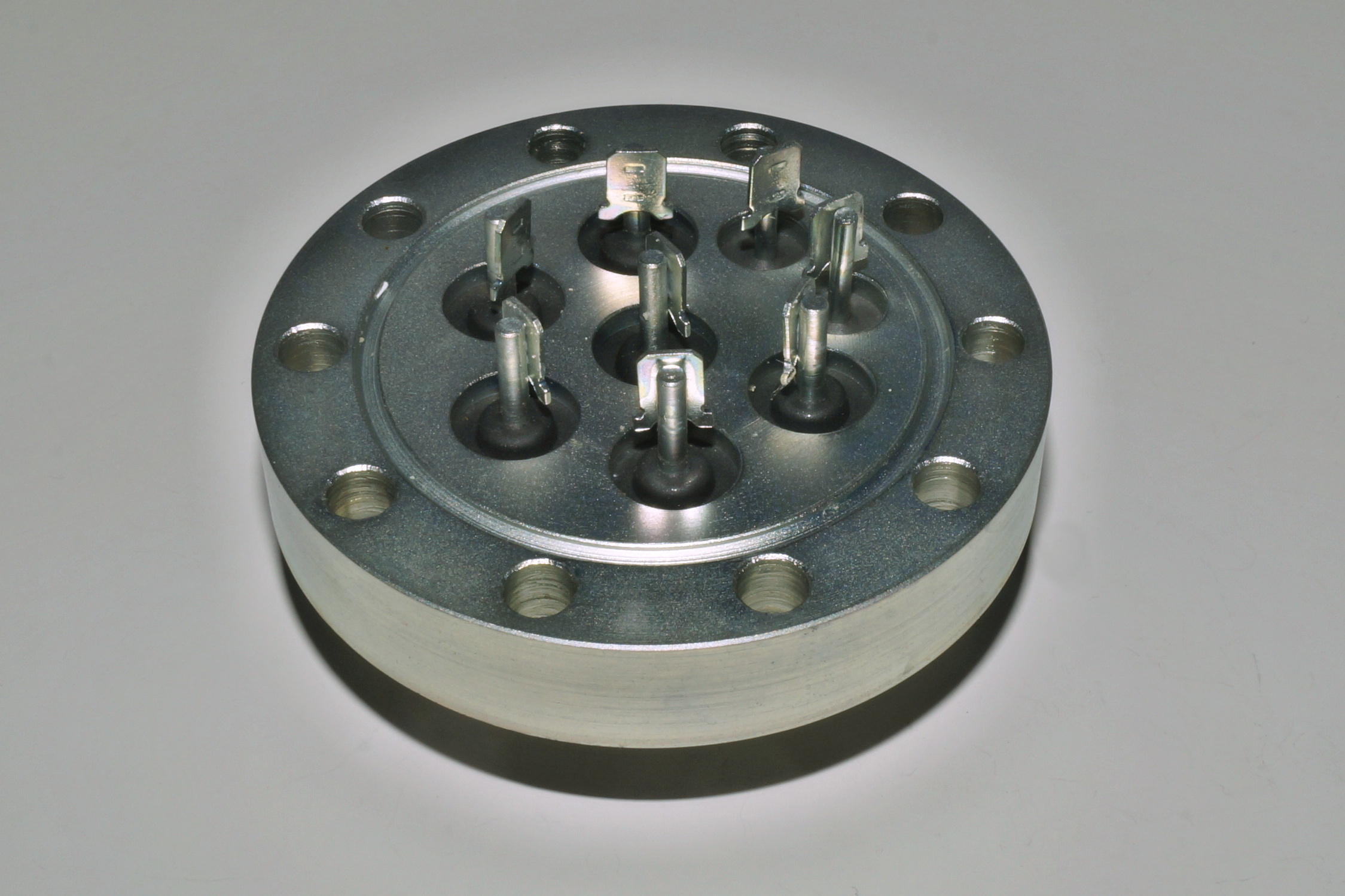
Semi-hermetic compressor multipole feedthrough (compression glass-to-metal-seal)

Another possibility of seal construction is the compression seal. This type of glass-to-metal seal can be used to feed through the wall of a metal container. Here the wire is usually matched to the glass which is inside of the bore of a strong metal part with higher coefficient of thermal expansion. Compression seals can withstand extremely high pressures (Note: Because of the glass which is extremely strong in compression.) and physical stress such as mechanical and thermal shock.

== Silver chloride ==
Silver chloride, which melts at 457 C bonds to glass, metals and other materials and has been used for vacuum seals. Even if it can be a convenient way to seal metal into glass it will not be a true glass to metal seal but rather a combination of a glass to silver chloride and a silver chloride to metal bond; an inorganic alternative to wax or glue bonds.

== Design aspects ==
Also the mechanical design of a glass-to-metal seal has an important influence on the reliability of the seal. In practical glass-to-metal seals cracks usually start at the edge of the interface between glass and metal either inside or outside the glass container. If the metal and the surrounding glass are symmetric the crack propagates in an angle away from the axis. So, if the glass envelope of the metal wire extends far enough from the wall of the container the crack will not go through the wall of the container but it will reach the surface on the same side where it started and the seal will not leak despite the crack.

Another important aspect is the wetting of the metal by the glass. If the thermal expansion of the metal is higher than the thermal expansion of the glass like with the Houskeeper seal, a high contact angle (bad wetting) means that there is a high tensile stress in the surface of the glass near the metal. Such seals usually break inside the glass and leave a thin cover of glass on the metal. If the contact angle is low (good wetting) the surface of the glass is everywhere under compression stress like an enamel coating. Ordinary soda-lime glass does not flow on copper at temperatures below the melting point of the copper and, thus, does not give a low contact angle. The solution is to cover the copper with a solder glass which has a low melting point and does flow on copper and then to press the soft soda-lime glass onto the copper. The solder glass must have a coefficient of thermal expansion which is equal or a little lower than that of the soda-lime glass. Classically high lead containing glasses are used, but it is also possible to substitute these by multi-component glasses e.g. based on the system Li_{2}O-Na_{2}O-K_{2}O-CaO-SiO_{2}-B_{2}O_{3}-ZnO-TiO_{2}-BaO-Al_{2}O_{3}.

== See also ==
- Hermetic seal
