= Barium tungstate =

Names
- Other names: Barium wolframate; Tungstate white; Wolfram white

Identifiers
CAS Number	7787-42-0
3D model (JSmol)	Interactive image
ChemSpider	145169
ECHA InfoCard	100.029.195
EC Number	232-114-3
PubChem CID	4280986
- InChI: InChI=1S/Ba.4O.W/q+2;;;2*-1; Key: SJPVUFMOBDBTHQ-UHFFFAOYSA-N
- SMILES: [O-][W](=O)(=O)[O-].[Ba+2]

Properties
Chemical formula	BaWO_{4}
Molar mass	385.16 g·mol^{−1}
Appearance	white solid
Density	5.04 g·cm^{−3} (25 °C); 7.26 g·cm^{−3} (high pressure form)
Melting point	1502 °C
Solubility in water	insoluble

Structure
Crystal structure	tetragonal
Lattice constant	a = 561.4 pm, c = 1271.5 pm

Hazards
- GHS labelling
Pictograms	(GHS07: Exclamation mark)
Hazard statements	H302, H332

Related compounds
Related compounds	Radium tungstate
- Except where otherwise noted, data are given for materials in their standard state (at 25 °C [77 °F], 100 kPa). Infobox references

Barium tungstate is an inorganic chemical compound of barium and the tungstate anion.

== Synthesis and properties ==
Barium tungstate can be obtained from the precipitation reaction between barium nitrate and ammonium paratungstate or sodium tungstate.

Ba(NO_{3})_{2} + Na_{2}WO_{4} → BaWO_{4}↓ + 2 NaNO_{3}

It is a white solid, which at normal conditions forms tetragonal crystals similar to scheelite, CaWO_{4}. Under pressures above 7 GPa, the compound undergoes transformation to a monoclinic structure similar to fergusonite, YNbO_{4}.

== Uses ==
Barium tungstate can be used as a frequency shifter in laser technology. It has uses in X-ray photography and as a pigment.
