= Nickel(II) chromate =

Nickel chromate
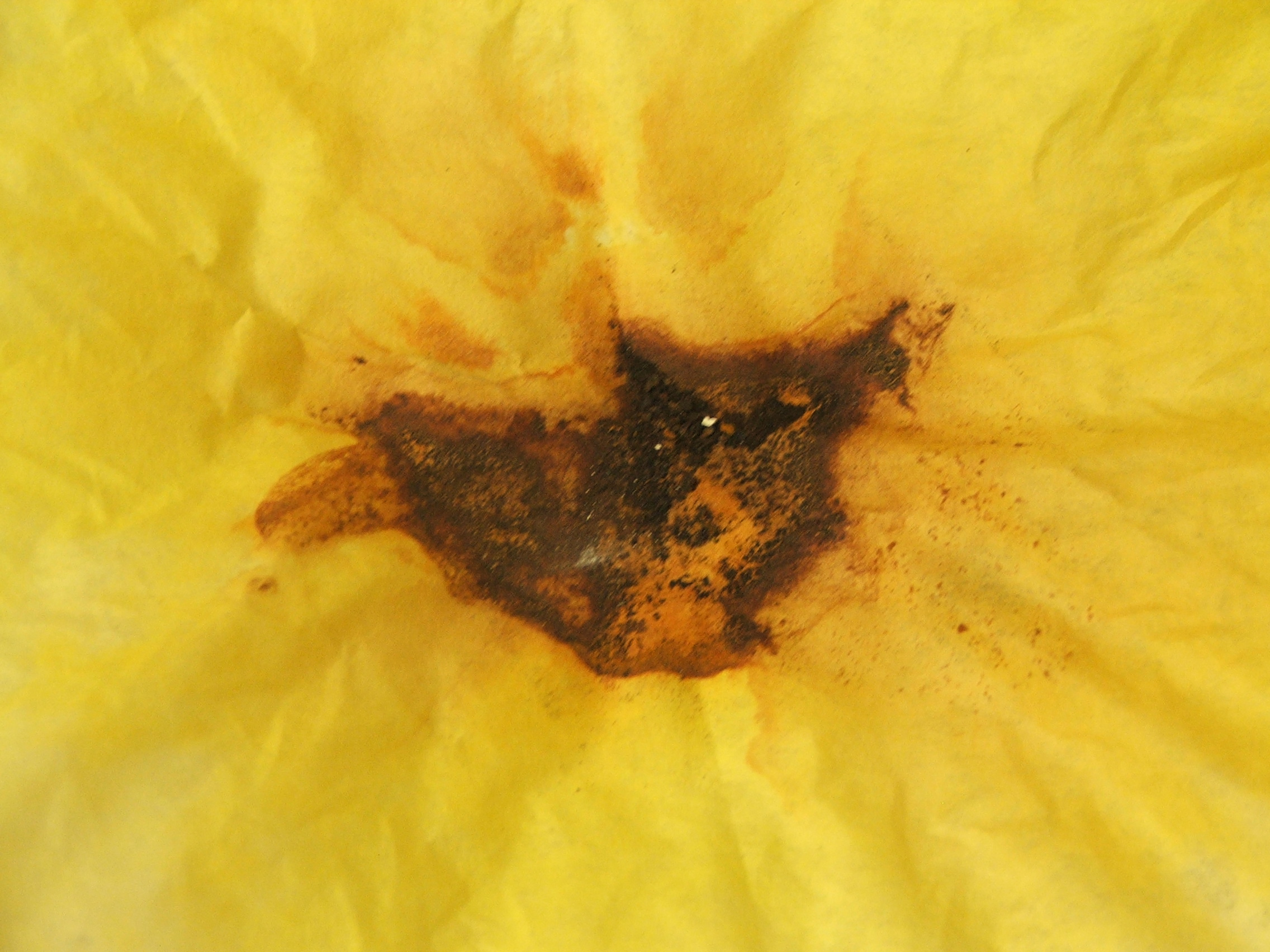

Names
- IUPAC name Nickel(II) chromate
- Other names nickelous chromate nickel chromate nickel(II) chromium(VI) oxide

Identifiers
CAS Number	14721-18-7
3D model (JSmol)	Interactive image
ChemSpider	55656
ECHA InfoCard	100.035.227
EC Number	238-766-5
PubChem CID	61767
UNII	CVN4EAC59C
CompTox Dashboard (EPA)	DTXSID201027437
- InChI: InChI=1S/Cr.Ni.4O/q;+2;;;2*-1 Key: QGAXAFUJMMYEPE-UHFFFAOYSA-N
- SMILES: [O-][Cr](=O)(=O)[O-].[Ni+2]

Properties
Chemical formula	NiCrO_{4}
Molar mass	174.71 g/mol
Appearance	dark maroon-colored powder
Solubility in water	very slightly soluble in water
Solubility	soluble in hydrochloric acid

Hazards
- GHS labelling
Pictograms	(GHS08: Health hazard) (GHS09: Environmental hazard)
Signal word	Danger
Hazard statements	H317, H334, H350i, H372, H410
Precautionary statements	P203, P233, P260, P264, P270, P271, P272, P273, P280, P284, P302+P352, P304+P340, P318, P319, P321, P333+P317, P342+P316, P362+P364, P391, P403, P405, P501
Flash point	Non-flammable

Related compounds
Other anions	nickel(II) molybdate nickel(II) tungstate
Other cations	magnesium chromate cadmium chromate
- Except where otherwise noted, data are given for materials in their standard state (at 25 °C [77 °F], 100 kPa). verify (what is ?) Infobox references

Nickel(II) chromate is an inorganic compound with the chemical formula (NiCrO_{4}). It is red-brown in color and has a high heat tolerance. It is very slightly soluble in water and soluble in acid. It and the ions that compose it (nickel(II) and chromate) have been linked to tumor formation and gene mutation, particularly to wildlife.

== Synthesis ==
Nickel(II) chromate can be formed in the lab by heating a mixture of chromium(III) oxide and nickel oxide at between 700 °C and 800 °C under oxygen at 1000 atm pressure. It can be produced at 535 °C and 7.3 bar oxygen, but the reaction takes days to complete. If the pressure is too low or temperature too high but above 660 °C, then the nickel chromium spinel NiCr_{2}O_{4} forms instead.

It is claimed it can be made using a hydrothermal technique.

Precipitates of Ni^{2+} ions with chromate produce a brown substance that contains water.

== Properties ==
The structure of nickel chromate is the same as for chromium vanadate, CrVO_{4}. Crystals have an orthorhombic structure with unit cell sizes a = 5.482 Å, b = 8.237 Å, c = 6.147 Å. The cell volume is 277.6 Å^{3} with four formula per unit cell.

Nickel chromate is dark in color, unlike most other chromates which are yellow. The infrared spectrum of nickel chromate show two sets of absorption bands. The first includes lines at 925, 825, and 800 cm^{−1} due to Cr-O stretching, and the second has lines at 430, 395, 365 (very weak) due to Cr-O rock and bend and 310 cm^{−1} produced from Ni-O stretching.

== Reactions ==
When heated at lower oxygen pressure around 600 °C, nickel chromate decomposes to the nickel chromite spinel, nickel oxide and oxygen.

4 NiCrO_{4} → 2 NiCr_{2}O_{4} + 2 NiO + 3 O_{2} (gas)

== Related compounds ==
Nickel chromates can also crystallize with ligands. For instance, with 1,10-phenanthroline it can form:

- [Ni(1,10-phenanthroline)CrO_{4}•3H_{2}O]•H_{2}O – triclinic olive-colored crystals
- Ni(1,10-phenanthroline)_{3}Cr_{2}O_{7}•3H_{2}O – orange crystals
- Ni(1,10-phenanthroline)_{3}Cr_{2}O_{7}•8H_{2}O – yellow powder
