= Glass-ceramic-to-metal seals =

Airtight seal between glass-ceramic and metal surfaces

A glass-ceramic-to-metal seal is a type of mechanical seal which binds glass-ceramic and metal surfaces. They are related to glass-to-metal seals, and like them are hermetic (airtight).

== Properties ==
Glass-ceramics are polycrystalline ceramic materials prepared by the controlled crystallization of suitable glasses, normally silicates. Depending on the starting glass composition and the heat-treatment schedule adopted, glass-ceramics can be prepared with tailored thermal expansion characteristics. This makes them ideal for sealing to a variety of different metals, ranging from low expansion tungsten (W) or molybdenum (Mo) to high expansion stainless steels and nickel-based superalloys.

Glass-ceramic-to-metal seals offer superior properties over their glass equivalents including more refractory behaviour, in addition to their ability to seal successfully to many different metals and alloys. They have been used in electrical feed-through seals for such applications as vacuum interrupter envelopes and pyrotechnic actuators, in addition to many applications where a higher temperature capability than is possible with glass-to-metal seals is required, including solid oxide fuel cells.

== Process ==
In the formation of a glass-ceramic-to-metal seal, the parts to be joined are first heated, normally under inert atmosphere, in order to melt the glass and allow it to wet and flow into the metal parts, in much the same way as when preparing a more conventional glass-to-metal seal. The temperature is then normally reduced into a temperature regime where many microscopic nuclei are formed in the glass. The temperature is then raised again into a regime where the major crystalline phases can form and grow to create the polycrystalline ceramic material with thermal expansion characteristics matched to that of the particular metal parts.

== Examples ==
The white opaque "glue" between the panel and the funnel of a colour TV cathode ray tube is a devitrified solder glass based on the system PbO–ZnO–B_{2}O_{3}. While this is a glass-ceramic-to-glass seal, the basic patent of S.A. Claypoole considers glass-ceramic-to-metal seals as well.
