= Intermediate oxides of tungsten =

Class of chemical compounds

A number of unusual intermediate oxides are formed from reacting tungsten metal and tungsten trioxide (WO_{3}), including W_{20}O_{58} and W_{24}O_{70}. W_{18}O_{49} contains both octahedral and pentagonal bipyramidal co-ordination of the metal atoms by oxygen.

Tungsten pentoxide (W_{2}O_{5}) was reported in early literature but proved to have the stoichiometry W_{18}O_{49}. Sometimes called mineral blue, it is a blue solid formed by the reaction of tungsten trioxide and tungsten metal at 700 °C.

== See also ==
- Tungsten(III) oxide
- Tungsten(IV) oxide
- Tungsten(VI) oxide
