= Cobalt(II) tungstate =

Names
- Other names Cobalt tungstate

Identifiers
CAS Number	10101-58-3
ECHA InfoCard	100.030.218
EC Number	233-254-8
PubChem CID	11738337
CompTox Dashboard (EPA)	DTXSID40881411

Properties
Chemical formula	CoWO_{4}
Molar mass	306.77 g/mol
Appearance	Greenish-blue to blue-black crystalline solid
Density	8.42 g/cm^{3}
Melting point	1,280 °C (2,340 °F; 1,550 K)
Solubility in water	Nearly insoluble in water

Structure
Crystal structure	Monoclinic, wolframite type
Space group	P2/c, No. 13
- Except where otherwise noted, data are given for materials in their standard state (at 25 °C [77 °F], 100 kPa). Infobox references

Cobalt(II) tungstate is an inorganic compound with the chemical formula CoWO_{4}. It is a greenish-blue to blue-black crystalline solid and belongs to the wolframite family of transition-metal tungstates.

== Structure and properties ==
Cobalt(II) tungstate crystallizes in the monoclinic crystal system with the wolframite-type structure, in space group P2/c (No. 13). Its structure contains distorted CoO_{6} and WO_{6} octahedra linked through shared edges and corners to form a three-dimensional framework.

CoWO_{4} is paramagnetic at room temperature and becomes antiferromagnetic at low temperature. Nanocrystalline CoWO_{4} has a reported Néel temperature of about 40 K, somewhat lower than bulk material because of reduced exchange coupling in nanoscale particles.

It is also a semiconductor. Reported optical band gaps are typically in the vicinity of 2.7–2.9 eV, and CoWO_{4} has been described as showing p-type electrical conductivity.

CoWO_{4} is nearly insoluble in water but dissolves in hot concentrated acids.

== Occurrence ==
A material with the composition CoWO_{4} has been found in burning coal refuse and is known as krasnoselskite. Because it is of anthropogenic origin, it is not recognized by the International Mineralogical Association as a valid mineral species. It is classified structurally with the wolframite group.

== Preparation ==
Cobalt(II) tungstate can be prepared by precipitation from aqueous solutions of cobalt(II) sulfate and sodium tungstate:

CoSO_{4} + Na_{2}WO_{4} → CoWO_{4}↓ + Na_{2}SO_{4}

Nanocrystalline CoWO_{4} can also be prepared hydrothermally. Hydrothermal syntheses without templates or surfactants have produced nanocrystals with sizes on the order of tens of nanometres.

== Applications ==
Cobalt(II) tungstate has been investigated as a photocatalyst and electrocatalyst. In 2025, research examined CoWO_{4}-based materials for oxygen evolution, oxygen reduction, nitrate reduction, photocatalytic hydrogen evolution, carbon dioxide reduction and degradation of organic pollutants.

It has also been used as a ceramic pigment and has been investigated as a catalyst and functional oxide material.
