= Silver tungstate =

Names
- IUPAC name Disilver;dioxido(dioxo)tungsten

Identifiers
CAS Number	13465-93-5
3D model (JSmol)	Interactive image
ChemSpider	10790108
ECHA InfoCard	100.033.357
EC Number	236-708-3
PubChem CID	22045798
- InChI: InChI=1S/2Ag.4O.W/q2*+1;;;2*-1; Key: QEKREONBSFPWTQ-UHFFFAOYSA-N
- SMILES: [O-][W](=O)(=O)[O-].[Ag+].[Ag+]

Properties
Chemical formula	Ag_{2}WO_{4}
Molar mass	463.57 g mol^{−1}

Hazards
- GHS labelling
Pictograms	(GHS07: Exclamation mark)
Signal word	Warning
Hazard statements	H315, H319, H335
- Except where otherwise noted, data are given for materials in their standard state (at 25 °C [77 °F], 100 kPa). Infobox references

Silver tungstate is an inorganic tungstate with the chemical formula Ag_{2}WO_{4}. It has been applied in various fields such as photoluminescence, antibacterial action, ozone gas sensors and humidity sensors. It is also used in the electronic and chemical industries, and also used in proteomics research.

== Phases ==
Silver tungstate occurs in three polymorphic phases: orthorhombic (α), hexagonal (β) and cubic (γ). α-silver tungstate is thermodynamically stable, while β- and γ-silver tungstate are metastable.

== Synthesis ==
Silver tungstate is synthesised through the following reaction between silver nitrate and sodium tungstate, producing sodium nitrate as a byproduct:

2 AgNO_{3} + Na_{2}WO_{4} → Ag_{2}WO_{4} + 2 NaNO_{3}
