= Radium tungstate =

Names
- Preferred IUPAC name Radium tungstate

Identifiers
3D model (JSmol)	Interactive image
- InChI: InChI=1S/4O.Ra.W/q;;2*-1;+2; Key: UGMIYXIDESVGKX-UHFFFAOYSA-N
- SMILES: [Ra+2].[O-][W](=O)(=O)[O-]

Properties
Chemical formula	O_{4}RaW
Molar mass	474 g·mol^{−1}
Appearance	white solid
Solubility in water	slightly soluble

Related compounds
Related compounds	Barium tungstate
- Except where otherwise noted, data are given for materials in their standard state (at 25 °C [77 °F], 100 kPa). Infobox references

Radium tungstate is an inorganic compound of radium, oxygen, and tungsten with the chemical formula RaWO_{4}. This is a salt of wolframic acid and radium.

== Physical properties ==
The compound forms a white solid, slightly soluble in water. It is poorly known due to the high radioactivity of radium.
