= Caesium tungstate =

Names
- Other names: Cesium tungstate; Cesium tungsten oxide

Identifiers
CAS Number	13587-19-4
3D model (JSmol)	Interactive image
ChemSpider	11294571
ECHA InfoCard	100.033.639
EC Number	237-019-0
PubChem CID	22269592
CompTox Dashboard (EPA)	DTXSID50890877
- InChI: InChI=1S/2Cs.4O.W/q2*+1;;;2*-1; Key: VPXSRGLTQINCRV-UHFFFAOYSA-N
- SMILES: [O-][W](=O)(=O)[O-].[Cs+].[Cs+]

Properties
Chemical formula	Cs_{2}WO_{4}
Molar mass	513.65 g/mol
Melting point	>350 °C

Related compounds
Other cations	Lithium tungstate Sodium tungstate
- Except where otherwise noted, data are given for materials in their standard state (at 25 °C [77 °F], 100 kPa). Infobox references

Caesium tungstate or cesium tungstate is an inorganic chemical compound with the formula Cs_{2}WO_{4}. It is notable for forming a very dense liquid in solution (a solution containing 85.6g Cs_{2}WO_{4} per 100g water has a specific gravity of 3.0133). The solution is used in diamond processing, since diamond sinks in it, whereas most other rocks float.

== Properties ==
Caesium tungstate forms colorless crystals, which are strongly hygroscopic. A phase transition from orthorhombic to hexagonal crystal system occurs at 536 °C.

== Preparation ==
Caesium tungstate can be obtained by the reaction between caesium chloride (CsCl) and silver tungstate (Ag_{2}WO_{4}) or the reaction between tungstic acid and caesium hydroxide.
