= Ammonium paratungstate =

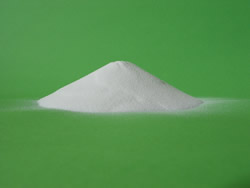

Identifiers
CAS Number	11120-25-5
ChemSpider	21241467
ECHA InfoCard	100.031.228
EC Number	234-364-9
PubChem CID	71306883
UNII	GCP1SFG106
CompTox Dashboard (EPA)	DTXSID20891417
- InChI: InChI=1S/10H3N.41O.12W/h10*1H3;;;;;;;;;;;;;;;;;;;;;;;;;;;;;;;;;;;;;;;;;;;;;;;;;;;;;/q;;;;;;;;;;;;;;;;;;;;;;;;;;;;;;;;;;;;;;;;;;;;;;5*-2;;;;;;;;;;;;/p+10 Key: LZTNPCZGBGTJFN-UHFFFAOYSA-X; InChI=1/10H3N.41O.12W/h10*1H3;;;;;;;;;;;;;;;;;;;;;;;;;;;;;;;;;;;;;;;;;;;;;;;;;;;;;/q;;;;;;;;;;;;;;;;;;;;;;;;;;;;;;;;;;;;;;;;;;;;;;5*-2;;;;;;;;;;;;/p+10/r10H3N.12O3W.5O/c;;;;;;;;;;12*1-4(2)3;;;;;/h10*1H3;;;;;;;;;;;;;;;;;/q;;;;;;;;;;;;;;;;;;;;;;5*-2/p+10 Key: LZTNPCZGBGTJFN-GEIIXCJIAC

Properties
Chemical formula	(NH_{4})_{10}(H_{2}W_{12}O_{42})·4H_{2}O
Molar mass	3132.2 g/mol
Appearance	White solid
Density	4.60 g/cm^{3}
Boiling point	Decomposes at 600 °C

Hazards
- GHS labelling
Pictograms	(GHS07: Exclamation mark)
Signal word	Warning
Hazard statements	H315, H319, H335
Precautionary statements	P261, P264, P271, P280, P302+P352, P304+P340, P305+P351+P338, P312, P321, P332+P313, P337+P313, P362, P403+P233, P405, P501
- Except where otherwise noted, data are given for materials in their standard state (at 25 °C [77 °F], 100 kPa). verify (what is ?) Infobox references

Ammonium paratungstate (or APT) is a white crystalline salt with the chemical formula (NH_{4})_{10}(H_{2}W_{12}O_{42})·4H_{2}O. It is described as "the most important raw material for all other tungsten products."

== Production ==
=== From tungsten ores ===
Tungsten ores, which are typically oxides, are digested in base to give solutions of tungstate together with many contaminating species. This crude extract is acidified and treated with sulfide to separate molybdenum trisulfide. Upon further acidification APT eventually crystallizes.

=== Laboratory methods ===
If calcined WO_{3} is used, refluxing the ammonia solution is advisable to accelerate its dissolution.

== Conversion to tungsten metal ==
Heating ammonium paratungstate to its decomposition temperature of 600 °C yields tungsten(VI) oxide, as described in this idealized equation

(NH_{4})_{10}(H_{2}W_{12}O_{42})·4H_{2}O → 12 WO_{3} + 10 NH_{3} + 10 H_{2}O

From there, the trioxide is heated in an atmosphere of hydrogen, yielding elemental tungsten:

WO_{3} + 3 H_{2} → W + 3 H_{2}O

== Structure ==
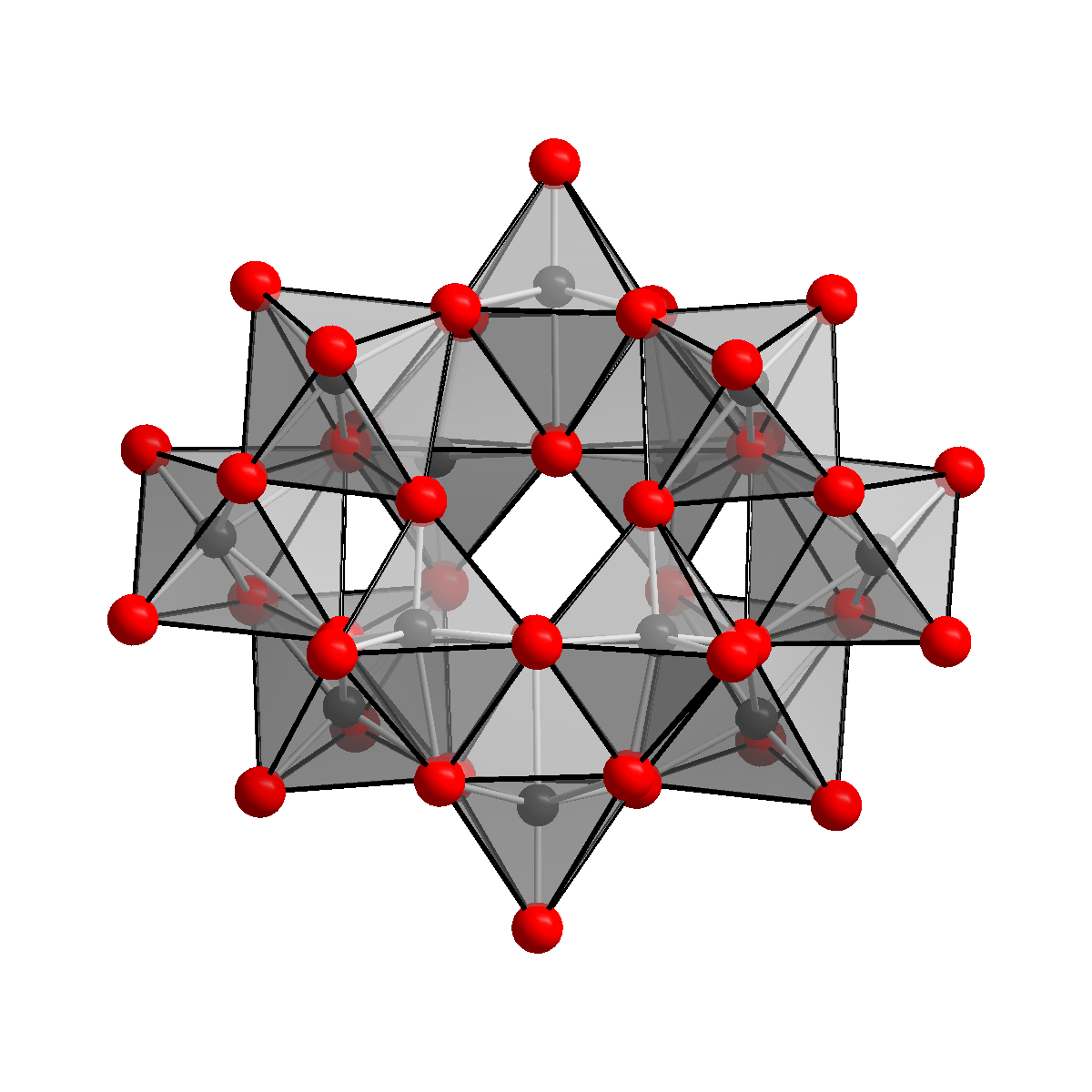
Structure of the [W_{12}O_{42}]^{12−} framework, emphasizing the coordination polyhedra. In APT, this anion binds two protons and is otherwise associated with ten NH^{+}_{4} counterions.

The anion in (NH_{4})_{10}(W_{12}O_{41})·5H_{2}O has been shown to be [H_{2}W_{12}O_{42}]^{10−}, containing two hydrogen atoms, keeping two hydrogen atoms inside the cage. The correct formula notation for ammonium paratungstate is therefore (NH_{4})_{10}[H_{2}W_{12}O_{42}]·4H_{2}O. The [H_{2}W_{12}O_{42}]^{10−} ion is known as the paratungstate B ion, as opposed to the paratungstate A ion, which has the formula [W_{7}O_{24}]^{6−}, similar to the paramolybdate ion. The existence of the paratungstate A ion, however, could not be confirmed by NMR spectroscopy.

Before about 1930, there has been some dispute about the exact composition of the salt, and both (NH_{4})_{10}W_{12}O_{41} and (NH_{4})_{6}W_{7}O_{24} were proposed. O.W. Gibbs remarked about this:

"The alkali tungstates are numerous and unusually complex. Salts of essentially different formulae approach so closely in percentage composition, that the differences lie very near the unavoidable errors of analyses. The analyses are hardly sufficiently close to decide the question upon purely analytical grounds."

=== Other hydrates ===
When concentrating an ammoniacal solution of tungstic acid (i.e. hydrous WO_{3}), the product obtained is ammonium paratungstate. Below 50 °C, the hexahydrate is formed, whereas when the temperature of the solution is above 50 °C, the pentahydrate or heptahydrate is formed. The former crystallizes as triclinic plates or prisms, whereas the latter as pseudorhombic needles. The tetrahydrate is most significant in a commercial sense. The decahydrate and the nonahydrateare also known.
