= Chromium silicide =

Chromium silicide may refer to the following chemical compounds:

- Trichromium silicide, Cr_{3}Si
- Pentachromium trisilicide, Cr_{5}Si_{3}
- Chromium(IV) silicide, CrSi
- Chromium(II) silicide, CrSi_{2}
