= Cadmium chromate =

Names
- IUPAC name Cadmium chromate

Identifiers
| CAS Number | 14312-00-6 |
| 3D model (JSmol) | Interactive image |
| ChemSpider | 14560858 |
| ECHA InfoCard | 100.034.759 |
| EC Number | 238-252-0 |
| PubChem CID | 20065476 |
| UNII | TAZ4TV25KL |
| CompTox Dashboard (EPA) | DTXSID101030489 |
- InChI: InChI=1S/Cd.Cr.4O/q+2;;;;2*-1 Key: GLPMHULIKFGNIJ-UHFFFAOYSA-N; InChI=1/Cd.Cr.4O/q+2;;;;2*-1/rCd.CrO4/c;2-1(3,4)5/q+2;-2 Key: GLPMHULIKFGNIJ-QCFQOAFPAB
- SMILES: [O-][Cr](=O)(=O)[O-].[Cd+2]

Properties
| Chemical formula | CdCrO_{4} |
| Molar mass | 228.405 |
| Appearance | yellow orthorhombic crystal |
| Density | 4.5 g/cm^{3} |
| Magnetic susceptibility (χ) | −16.8·10^{−6} cm^{3}/mol |

Hazards
- NIOSH (US health exposure limits)
| PEL (Permissible) | [1910.1027] TWA 0.005 mg/m^{3} (as Cd) |
| REL (Recommended) | Ca |
| IDLH (Immediate danger) | Ca [9 mg/m^{3} (as Cd)] |
- Except where otherwise noted, data are given for materials in their standard state (at 25 °C [77 °F], 100 kPa). Infobox references

Cadmium chromate is the inorganic compound with the formula CdCrO_{4}. It is relevant to chromate conversion coating, which is used to passivate common metal alloys such as aluminium, zinc, cadmium, copper, silver, magnesium, and tin. In conversion coating chromate reacts with these metals to prevent corrosion, retain electrical conductivity, and provide a finish for the appearance of the final alloy products. This process is commonly used on hardware and tool items. Chromate species take on their distinctive yellow color when coated.
