= Molybdenum trisulfide =

Names
- Other names Molybdenum(VI) sulfide

Identifiers
CAS Number	12033-29-3
3D model (JSmol)	Interactive image
ChemSpider	74744
PubChem CID	82831
CompTox Dashboard (EPA)	DTXSID70893183
- InChI: InChI=1S/Mo.3S Key: TVWWSIKTCILRBF-UHFFFAOYSA-N
- SMILES: S=[Mo](=S)=S

Properties
Chemical formula	MoS_{3}
Molar mass	192.155 g/mol
Appearance	dark brown solid
Solubility in water	insoluble
- Except where otherwise noted, data are given for materials in their standard state (at 25 °C [77 °F], 100 kPa). Infobox references

Molybdenum trisulfide is an inorganic compound with the formula MoS_{3}. It is a polysulfide, meaning it contains sulfur-sulfur bonds. Its formula can be represented as Mo^{4+}(S_{2})^{2−}S^{2−}. Molybdenum is in its +4 oxidation state.
