= Lithium tungstate =

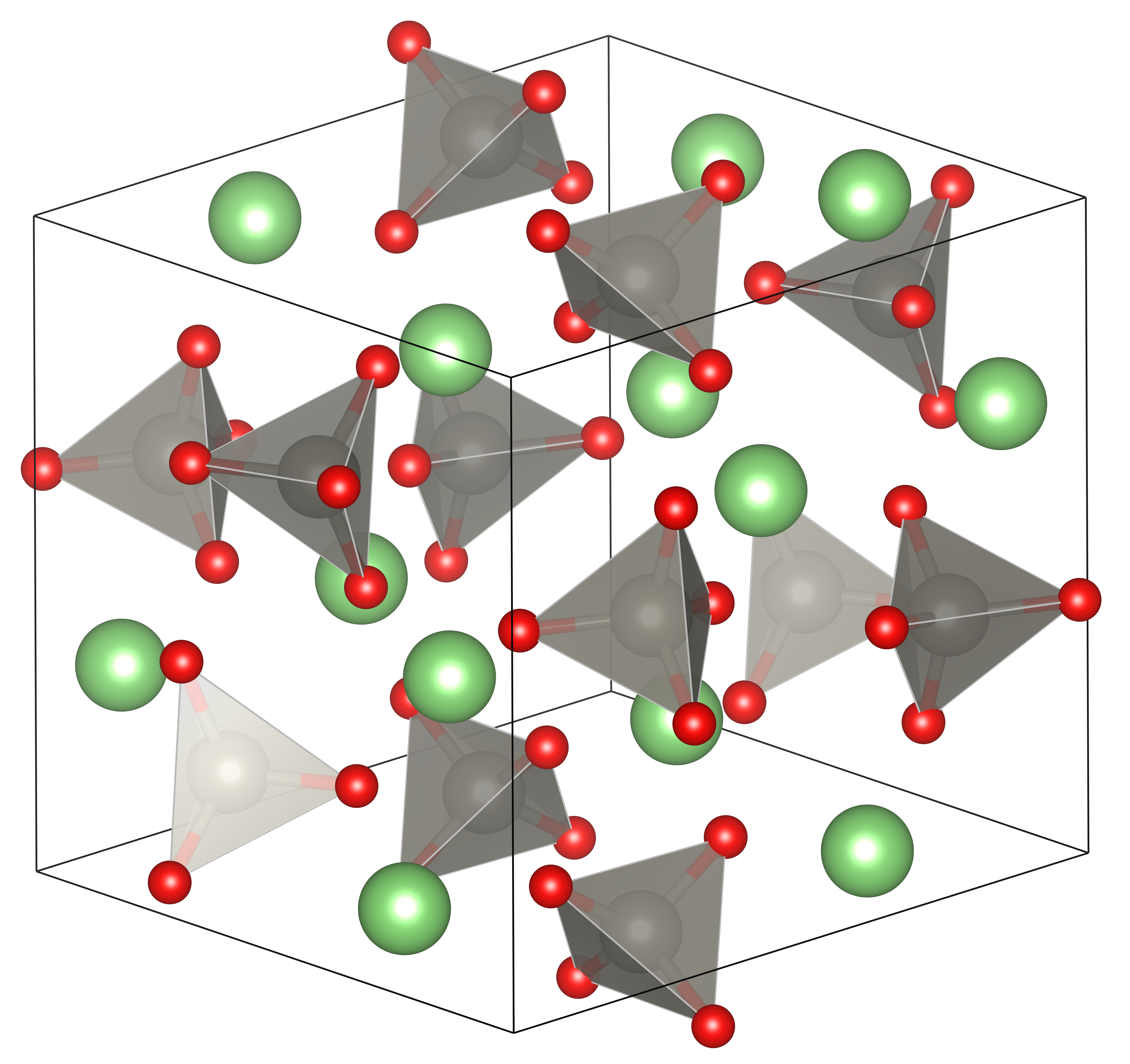

Identifiers
CAS Number	13568-45-1
3D model (JSmol)	Interactive image
ChemSpider	4239418
ECHA InfoCard	100.033.602
EC Number	236-978-2
PubChem CID	6095624
- InChI: InChI=1S/2Li.4O.W/q2*+1;;;2*-1; Key: SCKKBXOJPMZVPF-UHFFFAOYSA-N
- SMILES: [Li+].[Li+].[O-][W](=O)(=O)[O-]

Properties
Chemical formula	Li_{2}WO_{4}
Appearance	white solid
Density	4.56 g/cm^{3}

Related compounds
Other cations	Sodium tungstate Caesium tungstate
- Except where otherwise noted, data are given for materials in their standard state (at 25 °C [77 °F], 100 kPa). Infobox references

Lithium tungstate is the inorganic compound with the formula Li_{2}WO_{4}. It is a white solid that is soluble in water. The compound is one of the several orthotungstates, compounds that feature the tetrahedral WO_{4}^{2−} anion.

== Structure ==
The salt consists of tetrahedrally coordinated Li and W centres bridged by oxides. The W-O and Li-O bond distances are 1.79 and 1.96 Å, respectively. These differing bond lengths reflect the multiple bond character of the W-O interaction and the weaker ionic bonding between the Li-O interactions. The solid undergoes phase transitions at high pressures, such that the coordination geometry at tungsten becomes octahedral (six W-O bonds). For example, at 40 kilobars, it adopts a structure related to wolframite.

== Uses ==
Lithium tungstate is used to produce high density aqueous polytungstate (metatungstate) solutions. Like other high density fluids, such solutions are often used in the separation of minerals and other solids. These can achieve a density of 2.95 at 25 °C and up to 3.6 in hot water.

This use of lithium and sodium tungstate anions was developed in the 1980s and early 1990s to address toxicity and safety issues with the existing organic high density fluids. Unlike methylene iodide and bromoform, polytungstates and heteropolytungstates can be more safely be used in an indoor environment without a fume hood with only ordinary common sense safety precautions such as protective gloves and safety glasses.
