= Tungsten trioxide =

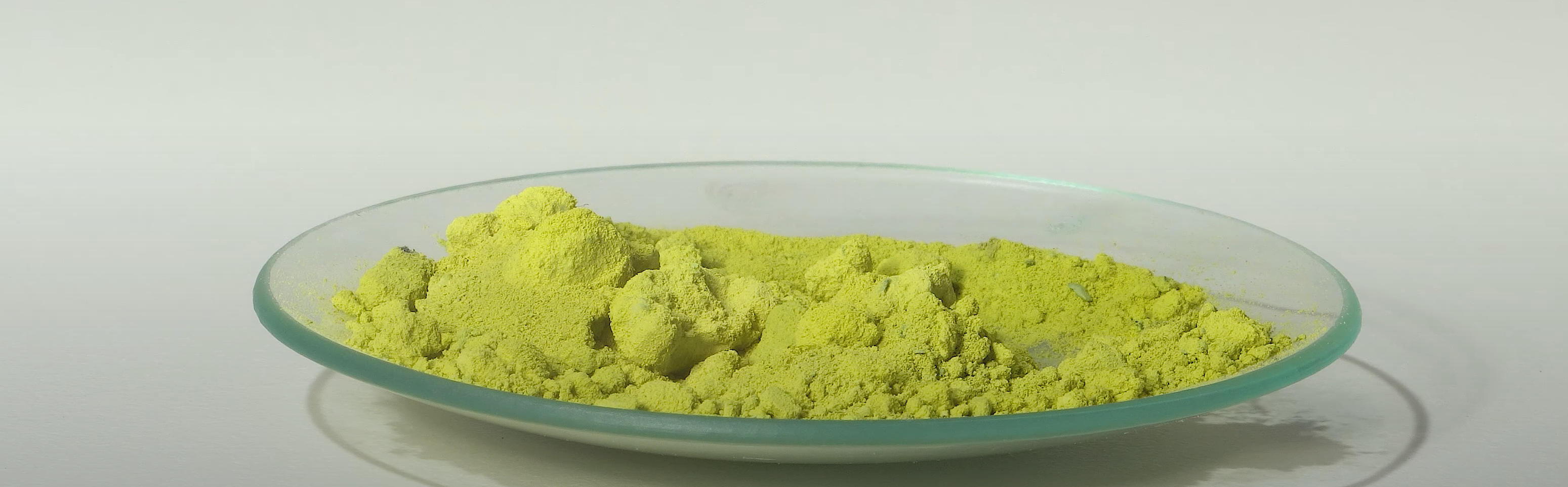
- Sample of Tungsten(VI) Oxide

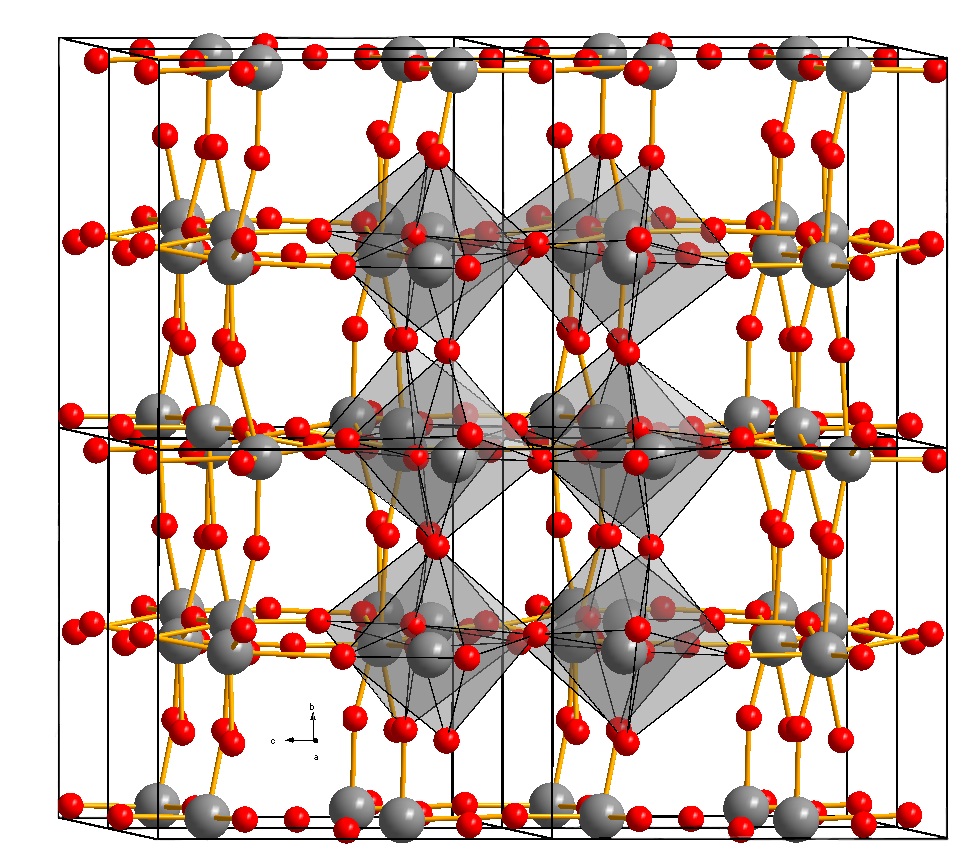

Names
- IUPAC name Tungsten trioxide
- Other names Tungstic anhydride Tungsten(VI) oxide Tungstic oxide

Identifiers
CAS Number	1314-35-8
3D model (JSmol)	Interactive image
ChemSpider	14127
ECHA InfoCard	100.013.848
EC Number	215-231-4
PubChem CID	14811
RTECS number	YO7760000
UNII	940E10M08M
CompTox Dashboard (EPA)	DTXSID7032262
- InChI: InChI=1S/3O.W Key: ZNOKGRXACCSDPY-UHFFFAOYSA-N
- SMILES: O=[W](=O)=O

Properties
Chemical formula	WO_{3}
Molar mass	231.84 g/mol
Appearance	Canary yellow powder
Density	7.16 g/cm^{3}
Melting point	1,473 °C (2,683 °F; 1,746 K)
Boiling point	1,700 °C (3,090 °F; 1,970 K) approximation
Solubility in water	insoluble
Solubility	slightly soluble in HF
Magnetic susceptibility (χ)	−15.8·10^{−6} cm^{3}/mol

Structure
Crystal structure	Monoclinic, mP32
Space group	P12_{1}/n1, No. 14
Coordination geometry	Octahedral (W^{VI}); Trigonal planar (O^{2–})

Hazards
- Occupational safety and health (OHS/OSH)
Main hazards	Irritant
Flash point	Non-flammable
Safety data sheet (SDS)	External MSDS

Related compounds
Other anions	Tungsten trisulfide
Other cations	Chromium trioxide Molybdenum trioxide
Related tungsten oxides	Tungsten(III) oxide Tungsten(IV) oxide
- Except where otherwise noted, data are given for materials in their standard state (at 25 °C [77 °F], 100 kPa). verify (what is ?) Infobox references

Tungsten(VI) oxide, also known as tungsten trioxide, is a chemical compound of oxygen and the transition metal tungsten, with formula WO_{3}. The compound is also called tungstic anhydride, reflecting its relation to tungstic acid H_{2}WO_{4}. It is a light yellow crystalline solid.

Tungsten(VI) oxide occurs naturally in the form of hydrates, which include minerals: tungstite WO_{3}·H_{2}O, meymacite WO_{3}·2H_{2}O, and hydrotungstite (of the same composition as meymacite, however sometimes written as H_{2}WO_{4}). These minerals are rare to very rare secondary tungsten minerals.

== History ==
In 1841, a chemist named Robert Oxland gave the first procedures for preparing tungsten trioxide and sodium tungstate. He was granted patents for his work soon after, and is considered to be the founder of systematic tungsten chemistry.

== Structure and properties ==
The crystal structure of tungsten trioxide is temperature dependent. It is tetragonal at temperatures above 740 °C, orthorhombic from 330 to 740 °C, monoclinic from 17 to 330 °C, triclinic from −50 to 17 °C, and monoclinic again at temperatures below −50 °C. The most common structure of WO_{3} is monoclinic with space group P2_{1}/n.

The pure compound is an electric insulator, but oxygen-deficient varieties, such as WO_{2.90} = W_{20}O_{58}, are dark blue to purple in color and conduct electricity. They can be prepared by combining the trioxide and the dioxide WO_{2} at 1000 °C in vacuum.

Possible signs of superconductivity with critical temperatures T_{c} = 80–90 K were claimed in sodium-doped and oxygen-deficient WO_{3} crystals. If confirmed, these would be the first superconducting materials containing no copper, with T_{c} higher than the boiling point of liquid nitrogen at normal pressure.

=== Crystallography ===
Tungsten trioxide exists in multiple polymorphs whose structures have been precisely determined using X-ray crystallography and neutron diffraction. Each phase exhibits a distinct arrangement of distorted WO_{6} octahedra, which affect its electronic and optical behavior.

Tungsten trioxide (WO_{3}) is a polymorphic compound whose crystal structure changes depending on temperature. It adopts several forms, including:

- Tetragonal above 740 °C
- Orthorhombic from 330 to 740 °C
- Monoclinic from 17 to 330 °C
- Triclinic from −50 to 17 °C
- A second monoclinic phase below −50 °C
- A hexagonal form synthesized under specific conditions

The most common ambient phase is monoclinic with space group P2_{1}/n, featuring distorted WO_{6} octahedra linked at their corners. Each polymorph exhibits variations in symmetry, lattice parameters, and atomic positions, making structural determination important for understanding the material's physical and electronic properties.

==== Tetragonal WO_{3} ====
This high-temperature phase is observed above 740 °C, but specific crystallographic data are often not tabulated separately in modern studies. It exhibits relatively symmetric WO_{6} octahedra.

==== Orthorhombic WO_{3} ====
- Space group: Pmnb (No. 62)
- Lattice parameters (Å): a = 7.341(4), b = 7.570(4), c = 7.754(4)
- Angles (°): α = β = γ = 90°
- Cell volume: 430.90 Å^{3}
- Z: 8
- Temperature: 873 K
- Pressure: Atmospheric
- R-value: 0.061
- Reference: Salje, E. (1977). Acta Crystallographica Section B, 33(2), 574–577.

==== Monoclinic WO_{3} ====
- Space group: P1/c1 (No. 7)
- Lattice parameters (Å): a = 5.27710(1), b = 5.15541(1), c = 7.66297(1)
- Angles (°): α = γ = 90°, β = 91.7590(2)
- Cell volume: 208.38 Å^{3}
- Z: 4
- Temperature: 5 K
- Pressure: Atmospheric
- R-value: 0.09
- Reference: Salje, E.K.H. et al. (1997). Journal of Physics: Condensed Matter, 9, 6563–6577.

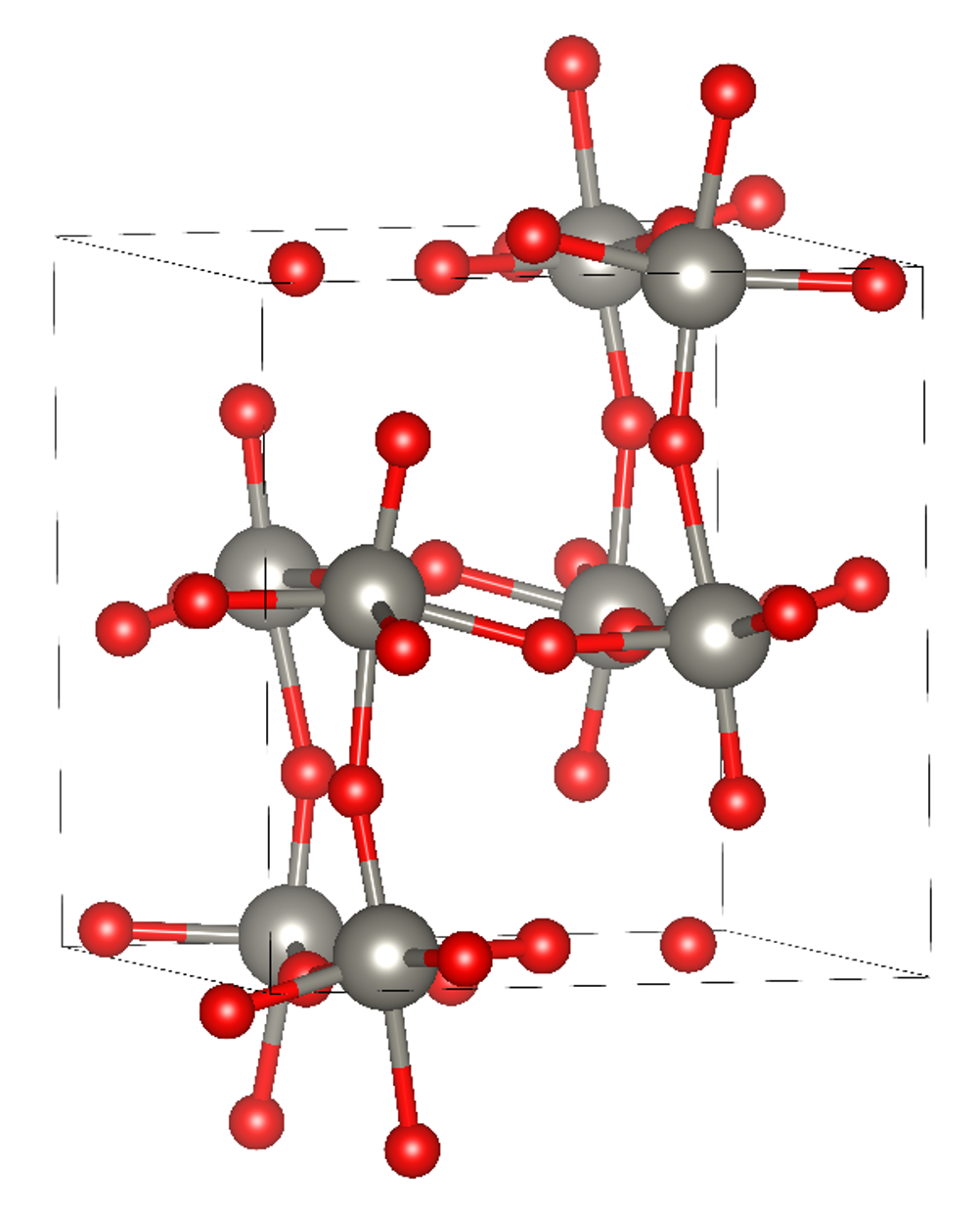
WO_{3} triclinic structure

==== Triclinic WO_{3} ====
- Space group: P−1 (No. 2)
- Lattice parameters (Å): a = 7.309(2), b = 7.522(2), c = 7.678(2)
- Angles (°): α = 88.81(2), β = 90.92(2), γ = 90.93(2)
- Cell volume: 421.92 Å^{3}
- Z: 8
- Temperature: Room temperature
- Pressure: Atmospheric
- R-value: 0.05
- Reference: Diehl, R. et al. (1978). Acta Crystallographica Section B, 34, 1105–1111.

==== Hexagonal WO_{3} ====
A less common hexagonal polymorph of WO_{3} has been reported and characterized using powder X-ray diffraction. It exhibits higher symmetry and potentially distinct electronic properties.

- Space group: P6/mmm (No. 191)
- Lattice parameters (Å): a = 7.298(2), c = 3.899(2)
- Angles (°): α = β = 90°, γ = 120°
- Cell volume: 179.84 Å^{3}
- Z: 3
- Temperature: Room temperature
- Pressure: Atmospheric
- R-value: 0.055
- Reference: Gérand, B. et al. (1979). Journal of Solid State Chemistry, 29, 429–434.

== Preparation ==
=== Industrial ===
Tungsten trioxide is obtained as an intermediate in the recovery of tungsten from its minerals. Tungsten ores can be treated with alkalis to produce soluble tungstates. Alternatively, CaWO_{4}, or scheelite, is allowed to react with HCl to produce tungstic acid, which decomposes to WO_{3} and water at high temperatures.

CaWO_{4} + 2 HCl → CaCl_{2} + H_{2}WO_{4}
H_{2}WO_{4} → H_{2}O + WO_{3}

=== Laboratory ===
Another common way to synthesize WO_{3} is by calcination of ammonium paratungstate (APT) under oxidizing conditions:

(NH_{4})_{10}[H_{2}W_{12}O_{42}] · 4 H_{2}O → 12 WO_{3} + 10 NH_{3} + 10 H_{2}O

== Reactions ==
Tungsten trioxide can be reduced with carbon or hydrogen gas yielding the pure metal.

2 WO_{3} + 3C → 2 W + 3 CO_{2} (high temperature)
WO_{3} + 3 H_{2} → W + 3 H_{2}O (550–850 °C)

== Uses ==
Tungsten trioxide is a starting material for the synthesis of tungstates. Barium tungstate BaWO_{4} is used as an X-ray screen phosphors. Alkali metal tungstates, such as lithium tungstate Li_{2}WO_{4} and cesium tungstate Cs_{2}WO_{4}, give dense solutions that can be used to separate minerals. Other applications, actual or potential, include:

- Fireproofing fabrics
- Gas and humidity sensors.
- Ceramic glazes where it gives a rich yellow color.
- Electrochromic glass, such as in smart windows, whose transparency can be changed by an applied voltage.
- Photocatalytic water splitting.
- Substrate for surface-enhanced Raman spectroscopy replacing noble metals.
