= Tungsten(IV) oxide =

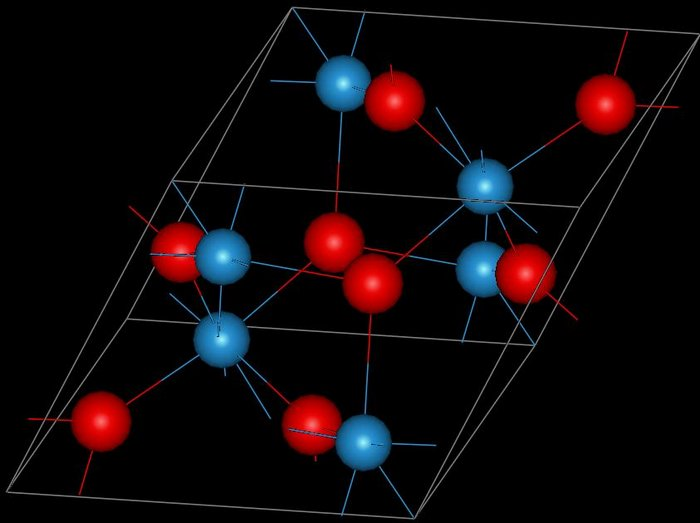
- Tungsten(IV) oxide

Names
- Other names Tungsten dioxide

Identifiers
CAS Number	12036-22-5
3D model (JSmol)	Interactive image
ChemSpider	10619276
ECHA InfoCard	100.031.662
EC Number	234-842-7
PubChem CID	82850
UNII	0Q43JGJ0GV
CompTox Dashboard (EPA)	DTXSID0065195
- InChI: InChI=1S/2O.W Key: GVBPDKRQHBYNSO-UHFFFAOYSA-N
- SMILES: O=[W]=O

Properties
Chemical formula	WO_{2}
Molar mass	215.839 g/mol
Appearance	Bronze solid
Density	10.8 g/cm^{3}
Melting point	1,474 °C (2,685 °F; 1,747 K) from doi: 10.1007/BF02877593, decomposes at 1,700 °C
Solubility in water	Negligible
Magnetic susceptibility (χ)	5.7×10^{−5} cm^{3}/mol

Structure
Crystal structure	Distorted rutile (monoclinic), mP12, space group P2_{1}/c, no 14

Hazards
Flash point	Non-flammable

Related compounds
Other anions	Tungsten disulfide
Other cations	Chromium(IV) oxide Molybdenum(IV) oxide
Related tungsten oxides	Tungsten(III) oxide Tungsten(VI) oxide
- Except where otherwise noted, data are given for materials in their standard state (at 25 °C [77 °F], 100 kPa). verify (what is ?) Infobox references

Tungsten(IV) oxide is the chemical compound with the formula WO_{2}. The bronze-colored solid crystallizes in a monoclinic cell. The rutile-like structure features distorted octahedral WO_{6} centers with alternate short W–W bonds (248 pm). Each tungsten center has the d^{2} configuration, which gives the material a high electrical conductivity.

WO_{2} is prepared by reduction of WO_{3} with tungsten powder over the course of 40 hours at 900 °C. An intermediate in this reaction is the partially reduced, mixed valence species W_{18}O_{49}.

2 WO_{3} + W → 3 WO_{2}

The molybdenum analogue MoO_{2} is prepared similarly. Single crystals are obtained by chemical transport technique using iodine. Iodine transports the WO_{2} in the form of the volatile species WO_{2}I_{2}.
