= Tungsten(III) oxide =

Names
- IUPAC name Tungsten(III) oxide
- Other names Tungsten sesquioxide

Identifiers
3D model (JSmol)	Interactive image
PubChem CID	12059771
- InChI: Key: ZSNLQFMCOVCISJ-UHFFFAOYSA-N; InChI=1S/3O.2W
- SMILES: O=[W]O[W]=O

Properties
Chemical formula	W_{2}O_{3}
Molar mass	415.68 g/mol
Density	g/cm^{3}

Related compounds
Related tungsten oxides	Tungsten trioxide Tungsten(IV) oxide
- Except where otherwise noted, data are given for materials in their standard state (at 25 °C [77 °F], 100 kPa). Infobox references

Tungsten(III) oxide (W_{2}O_{3}) is a compound of tungsten and oxygen. It has been reported (2006) as being grown as a thin film by atomic layer deposition at temperatures between 140 and 240 °C using W_{2}(N(CH_{3})_{2})_{6} as a precursor. It is not referred to in major textbooks. Some older literature refers to the compound W_{2}O_{3} but as the atomic weight of tungsten was believed at the time to be 92 (i.e., approximately half the modern accepted value of 183.84) the compound actually being referred to was WO_{3}.

Reports about the compound date back to at least the 1970s, but only in as thin films or surfaces – no bulk synthesis of the material is known.

== Usage ==
Tungsten(III) oxide is used in various types of infrared absorbing coatings and foils.
