= Sodium tungstate =

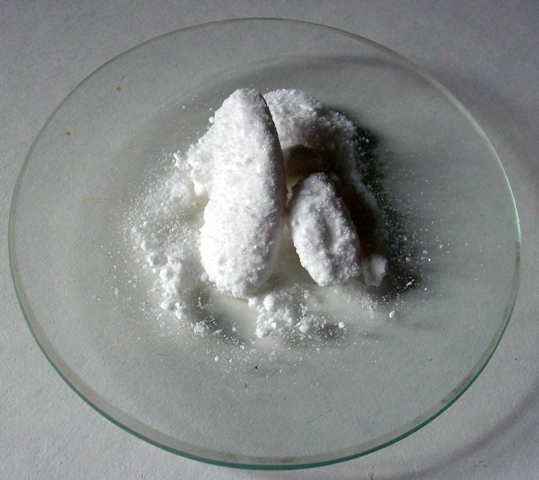
- Sodium tungstate

Names
- IUPAC name Sodium tungstate

Identifiers
CAS Number	13472-45-2
3D model (JSmol)	Interactive image
ChemSpider	24266
ECHA InfoCard	100.033.389
EC Number	236-743-4
PubChem CID	26052
RTECS number	YO7875000
UNII	64LRH4405G
CompTox Dashboard (EPA)	DTXSID4021420
- InChI: Key: XMVONEAAOPAGAO-UHFFFAOYSA-N; InChI=1S/2Na.4O.W/q2*+1;;;2*-1;
- SMILES: [O-][W](=O)(=O)[O-].[Na+].[Na+]

Properties
Chemical formula	Na_{2}WO_{4}
Molar mass	293.82 g/mol (anhydrous); 329.85 g/mol (dihydrate)
Appearance	White rhombohedral crystals
Density	4.179 g/cm^{3} (anhydrous); 3.25 g/cm^{3} (dihydrate)
Melting point	698 °C (1,288 °F; 971 K)
Solubility in water	57.5 g/100 mL (0 °C); 74.2 g/100 mL (25 °C); 96.9 g/100 mL (100 °C)
Solubility	slightly soluble in ammonia insoluble in alcohol, acid

Structure
Crystal structure	Rhombic (anhydrous) orthorhombic (dihydrate)

Hazards
- GHS labelling
Pictograms	(GHS07: Exclamation mark)
Signal word	Warning
Hazard statements	H302
Precautionary statements	P264, P270, P301+P317, P330, P501
Safety data sheet (SDS)	External MSDS

Related compounds
Other cations	Lithium tungstate Caesium tungstate
- Except where otherwise noted, data are given for materials in their standard state (at 25 °C [77 °F], 100 kPa). verify (what is ?) Infobox references

Sodium tungstate is the inorganic compound with the formula Na_{2}WO_{4}. This white, water-soluble solid is the sodium salt of tungstic acid. It is useful as a source of tungsten for chemical synthesis. It is an intermediate in the conversion of tungsten ores to the metal.

== Preparation and structure ==
Sodium tungstate is obtained by digestion of tungsten ores, the economically important representatives of which are tungstates, in base. Illustrative is the extraction of sodium tungstate from wolframite:

Fe/MnWO_{4} + 2 NaOH + 2 H_{2}O → Na_{2}WO_{4}·2H_{2}O + Fe/Mn(OH)_{2}

Scheelite is treated similarly using sodium carbonate.

Sodium tungstate can also be produced by treating tungsten carbide with a mixture of sodium nitrate and sodium hydroxide in a fusion process which overcomes the high exothermicity of the reaction involved.

Several polymorphs of sodium tungstate are known, three at only one atmosphere pressure. They feature tetrahedral orthotungstate dianions but differ in the packing motif. The WO^{2−}_{4} anion adopts a structure like sulfate (SO^{2−}_{4}).

== Reactions ==
Treatment of sodium tungstate with hydrochloric acid gives the tungsten trioxide or its acidic hydrates:

Na_{2}WO_{4} + 2 HCl → WO_{3} + 2 NaCl + H_{2}O
Na_{2}WO_{4} + 2 HCl → WO_{3}·H_{2}O + 2 NaCl

This reaction can be reversed using aqueous sodium hydroxide.

== Uses ==
The dominant use of sodium tungstate is as an intermediate in the extraction of tungsten from its ores, almost all of which are tungstates. Otherwise sodium tungstate has only niche applications.

In organic chemistry, sodium tungstate is used as catalyst for epoxidation of alkenes and oxidation of alcohols into aldehydes or ketones. It exhibits anti-diabetic effects.

Solutions of sodium and lithium metatungstates are used in density separation. Such solutions are less toxic than bromoform and methylene iodide, but still have densities that fall between a number of naturally coupled minerals.

Sodium tungstate is a competitive inhibitor of molybdenum; because tungsten is directly below molybdenum on the periodic table, it has similar electrochemical properties. Dietary tungsten reduces the concentration of molybdenum in tissues. Some bacteria use molybdenum cofactor as part of their respiratory chain; in these microbes, tungstate can replace molybdenum and inhibit the generation of energy by aerobic respiration. As such, one niche use of sodium tungstate is in experimental biology—where it has been found that adding sodium tungstate to the drinking water of mice inhibits the growth of Enterobacteriaceae (a family of endogenous opportunistic pathogens) in the gut.

Sodium tungstate has been researched as a potential treatment for infertility under the code OXO-001.
