= Phosphate test =

Phosphate(PO4 3-) test
- Classification: Colorimetric method
- Analytes: Phosphate

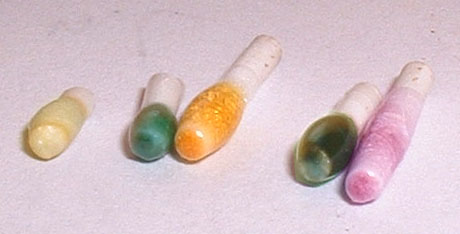
Microcosmic salt beads (Phosphorsalzperlen) showing various metal test results, including silver, copper, nickel, iron, and manganese salts

A range of qualitative and quantitative tests have been developed to detect phosphate ions (PO^{3−}_{4}) in solution. Such tests find use in industrial processes, scientific research, and environmental water monitoring.

== Quantitative method ==
A quantitative method to determine the amount of phosphate present in samples, such as boiler feedwater, is as follows. A measured amount of boiler water is poured into a mixing tube and ammonium heptamolybdate reagent is added. The tube is then stoppered and vigorously shaken. The next step is to add dilute stannous chloride reagent, which has been freshly prepared from concentrated stannous chloride reagent and distilled water, to the mixture in the tube. This will produce a blue colour (due to the formation of molybdenum blue) and the depth of the blue colour indicates the amount of phosphate in the boiler water. The absorbance of the blue solution can be measured with a colorimeter and the concentration of phosphate in the original solution can be calculated. Alternatively, a direct (but approximate) reading of phosphate concentration can be obtained by using a Lovibond comparator. This method for phosphate determination is known as Denigés' method.

== Qualitative method ==
A simple qualitative method to determine the presence of phosphate ions in a sample is as follows. A small amount of the sample is acidified with concentrated nitric acid, to which a little ammonium molybdate is added. The presence of phosphate ions is indicated by the formation of a bright yellow precipitate layer of ammonium phosphomolybdate. The appearance of the precipitate can be facilitated by gentle heating. This test is also used to detect arsenic, a yellow precipitate being formed.

== See also ==
- Phosphate analysis
