= Manganese(II) molybdate =

Inorganic compound

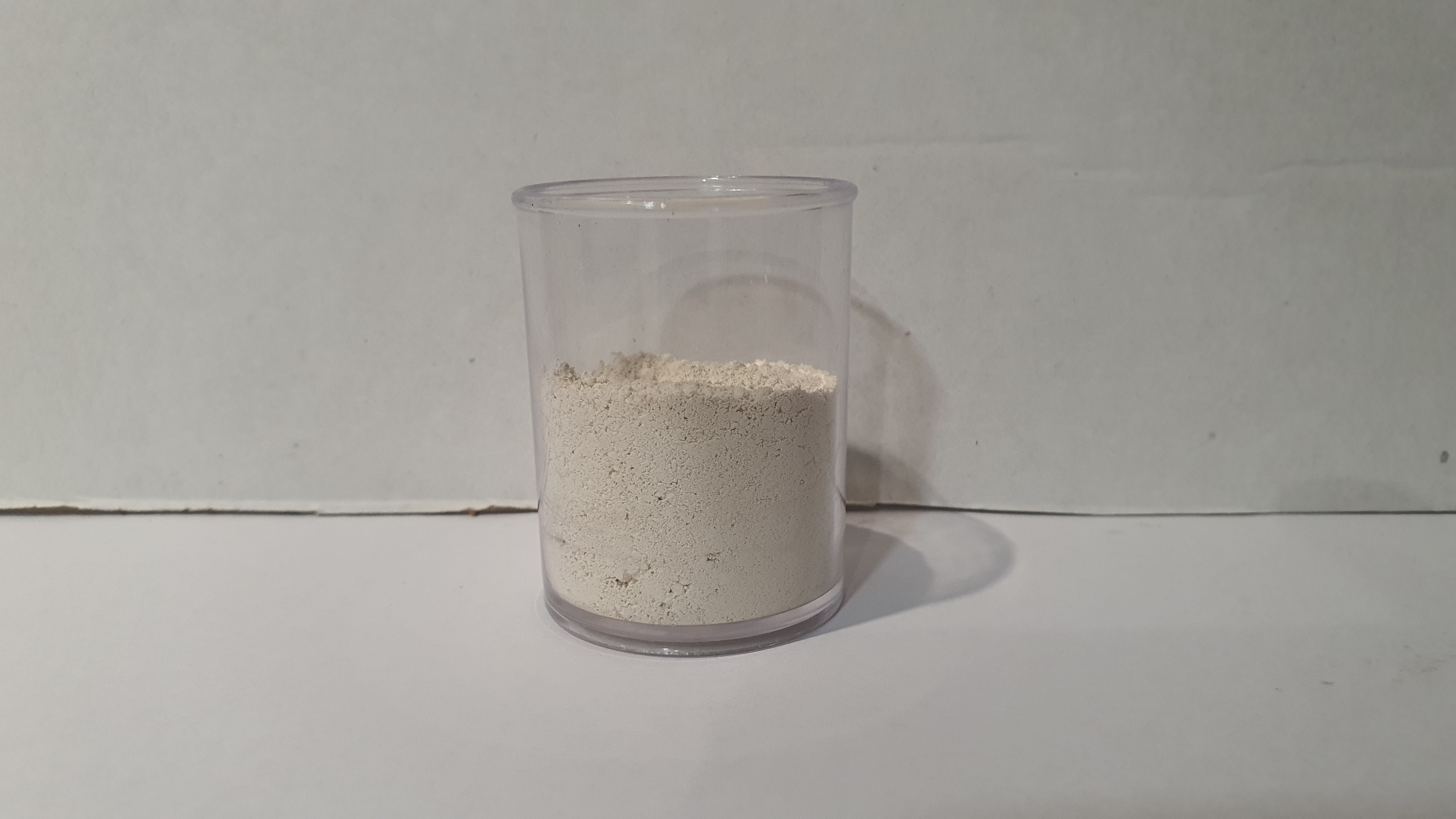

Names
- IUPAC name Manganese(II) molybdate
- Other names: Manganese molybdate; Manganese molybdenum oxide; Manganese molybdenum tetraoxide

Identifiers
CAS Number	14013-15-1
3D model (JSmol)	Interactive image
ChemSpider	75923
ECHA InfoCard	100.034.371
EC Number	237-823-1
PubChem CID	84155
CompTox Dashboard (EPA)	DTXSID801030492
- InChI: InChI=1S/Mn.Mo.4O/q+2;;;;2*-1 Key: QYZFLCQIQOHNTP-UHFFFAOYSA-N
- SMILES: [O-][Mo](=O)(=O)[O-].[Mn+2]

Properties
Chemical formula	MnMoO_{4}
Molar mass	214.876 g/mol (anhydrous); 232.901 g/mol (monohydrate)
Appearance	white-yellow to beige crystals or powder
Density	4.02 g/cm^{3}
Melting point	1,130 °C (2,070 °F; 1,400 K)
Solubility in water	insoluble
Refractive index (n_{D})	2.11

Hazards
- GHS labelling
Pictograms	(GHS08: Health hazard)
Signal word	Danger
Hazard statements	H360
Precautionary statements	P203, P280, P318, P405, P501
NFPA 704 (fire diamond)	3 0 0
- Except where otherwise noted, data are given for materials in their standard state (at 25 °C [77 °F], 100 kPa). Infobox references

Manganese(II) molybdate is an inorganic compound with the chemical formula MnMoO_{4}. α-MnMoO_{4} has a monoclinic crystal structure. It is also antiferromagnetic at low temperatures.

== Synthesis ==
Manganese(II) molybdate can be prepared through a double displacement reaction between sodium molybdate and manganese sulphate:

Na_{2}MoO_{4} + MnSO_{4} → Na_{2}SO_{4} + MnMoO_{4}

Manganese(II) molybdate has minimal solubility in water and will form a white-yellow precipitate which turns beige upon being refluxed. The precipitate can then be filtered from solution, which gives the monohydrate (MnMoO_{4}·H_{2}O); heating to 360 °C then provides the anhydrous salt.

Manganese(II) molybdate may also be prepared by heating various manganese oxides and molybdenum trioxide to 700 °C.

== Potential applications ==
MnMoO_{4} serves as the active material in electrodes for aqueous supercapacitors due to fast pseudocapacitive redox reactions. It has been evaluated as catalyst for hydrogen evolution.
