= Ammonium molybdate =

Ammonium molybdate can refer to:

- Ammonium orthomolybdate, (NH_{4})_{2}MoO_{4}
- Ammonium heptamolybdate, (NH_{4})_{6}Mo_{7}O_{24}, usually encountered as the tetrahydrate
- Ammonium phosphomolybdate, (NH_{4})_{3}PMo_{12}O_{40}
- Ammonium tetrathiomolybdate, (NH_{4})_{2}MoS_{4} this chemical is used for analysis of chloride in a solution

== See also ==
- Ammonium dimolybdate, (NH_{4})_{2}Mo_{2}O_{7}
