= Molybdenum dioxide =

Names
- IUPAC name Molybdenum(IV) oxide
- Other names Molybdenum dioxide Tugarinovite

Identifiers
| CAS Number | 18868-43-4 |
| 3D model (JSmol) | Interactive image |
| ChemSpider | 27268 |
| ECHA InfoCard | 100.038.746 |
| EC Number | 242-637-9 |
| PubChem CID | 29320 |
| CompTox Dashboard (EPA) | DTXSID10879986 DTXSID5042162, DTXSID10879986 |
- InChI: InChI=1S/Mo.2O Key: QXYJCZRRLLQGCR-UHFFFAOYSA-N
- SMILES: O=[Mo]=O

Properties
| Chemical formula | MoO_{2} |
| Molar mass | 127.94 g/mol |
| Appearance | brownish-violet solid |
| Density | 6.47 g/cm^{3} |
| Melting point | 1,100 °C (2,010 °F; 1,370 K) decomposes |
| Solubility in water | insoluble |
| Solubility | insoluble in alkalies, HCl, HF slightly soluble in hot H_{2}SO_{4} |
| Magnetic susceptibility (χ) | +41.0·10^{−6} cm^{3}/mol |

Structure
| Crystal structure | Distorted rutile (monoclinic) |
| Coordination geometry | Octahedral (Mo^{IV}); trigonal (O^{−II}) |

Hazards
| Flash point | Non-flammable |

Related compounds
| Other anions | Molybdenum disulfide |
| Other cations | Chromium(IV) oxide Tungsten(IV) oxide |
| Related molybdenum oxides | "Molybdenum blue" Molybdenum trioxide |
- Except where otherwise noted, data are given for materials in their standard state (at 25 °C [77 °F], 100 kPa). verify (what is ?) Infobox references

Molybdenum dioxide is the chemical compound with the formula MoO_{2}. It is a violet-colored solid and is a metallic conductor. The mineralogical form of this compound is called tugarinovite, and is only very rarely found.

== Structure ==
It crystallizes in a monoclinic cell, and has a distorted rutile, (TiO_{2}) crystal structure. In TiO_{2} the oxide anions are close packed and titanium atoms occupy half of the octahedral interstices (holes). In MoO_{2} the octahedra are distorted, the Mo atoms are off-centre, leading to alternating short and long Mo – Mo distances and Mo-Mo bonding. The short Mo – Mo distance is 251 pm which is less than the Mo – Mo distance in the metal, 272.5 pm. The bond length is shorter than would be expected for a single bond. The bonding is complex and involves a delocalisation of some of the Mo electrons in a conductance band accounting for the metallic conductivity.

== Preparation ==
MoO_{2} can be prepared :

- by reduction of MoO_{3} with Mo over the course of 70 hours at 800 °C (1,470 °F). The tungsten analogue, WO_{2}, is prepared similarly.

2 MoO_{3} + Mo → 3 MoO_{2}

- by reducing MoO_{3} with H_{2} or NH_{3} below 470 °C (878 °F)

Single crystals are obtained by chemical transport using iodine. Iodine reversibly converts MoO_{2} into the volatile species MoO_{2}I_{2}.

== Uses ==
Molybdenum dioxide is a constituent of "technical molybdenum trioxide" produced during the industrial processing of MoS_{2}:

2 MoS_{2} + 7 O_{2} → 2 MoO_{3} + 4 SO_{2}
MoS_{2} + 6 MoO_{3} → 7 MoO_{2} + 2 SO_{2}
2 MoO_{2} + O_{2} → 2 MoO_{3}

MoO_{2} has been reported as catalysing the dehydrogenation of alcohols, the reformation of hydrocarbons and biodiesel. Molybdenum nano-wires have been produced by reducing MoO_{2} deposited on graphite. Molybdenum dioxide has also been suggested as possible anode material for Li-ion batteries.
