= Iron(II) molybdate =

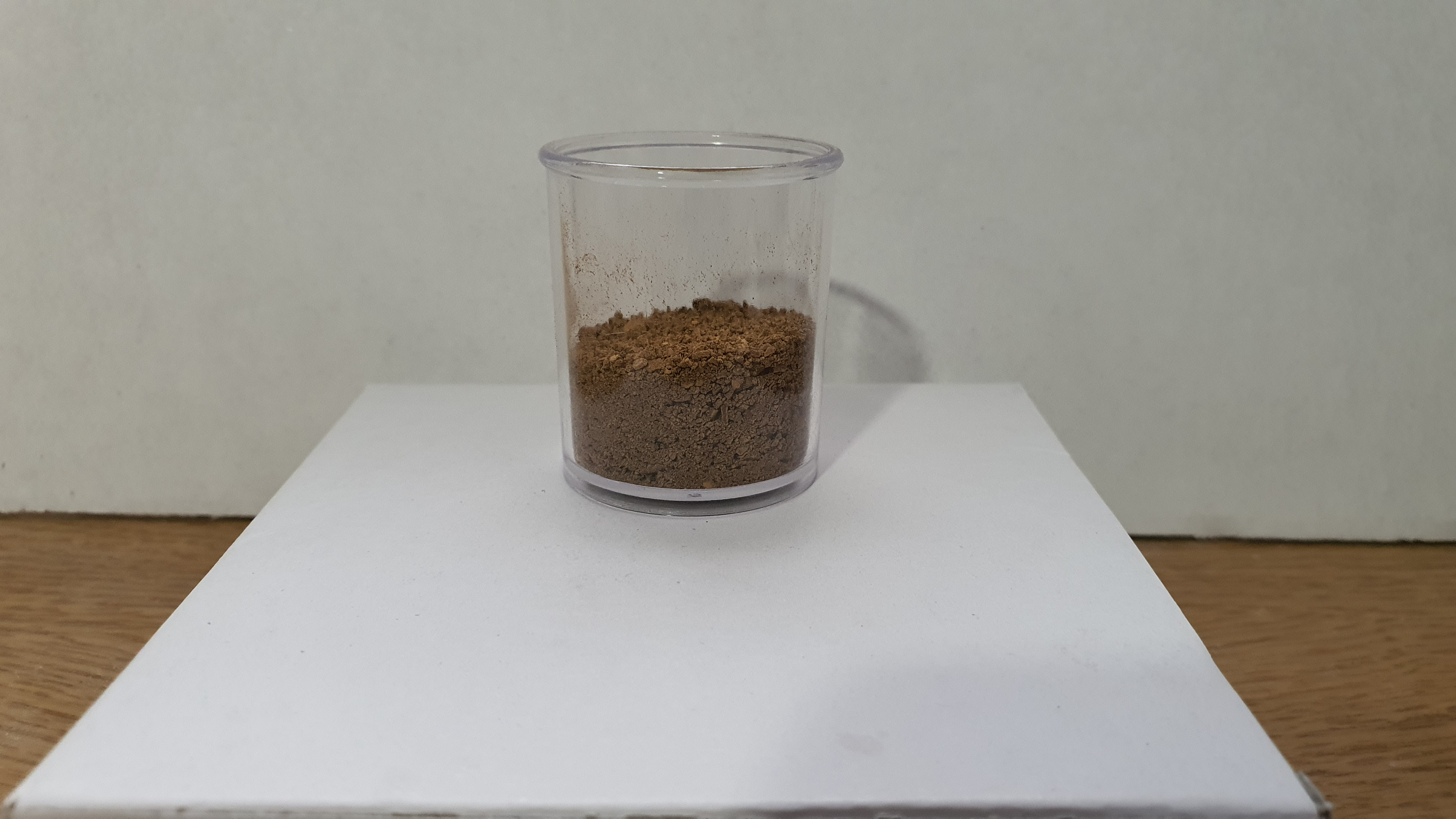

Names
- IUPAC name Iron(II) molybdate
- Other names Iron molybdate

Identifiers
CAS Number	13718-70-2
3D model (JSmol)	Interactive image
ChemSpider	13795022
PubChem CID	16217045
CompTox Dashboard (EPA)	DTXSID30584227
- InChI: InChI=1S/Fe.Mo.4O/q+2;;;;2*-1 Key: QQOCLJJWXLOEJE-UHFFFAOYSA-N
- SMILES: [O-][Mo](=O)(=O)[O-].[Fe+2]

Properties
Chemical formula	FeMoO_{4}
Molar mass	215.78 g/mol
Appearance	Dark brown, yellow solid
Density	5.6 g/cm^{3} (20 °C)
Melting point	1,115 °C (2,039 °F; 1,388 K)
Solubility in water	0.00766 g/100 mL (20 °C); 0.038 g/100 mL (100 °C)

Structure
Crystal structure	Monoclinic
Space group	P2_{1} (No. 4)
Lattice constant	a = 15.693 Å, b = 9.235 Å, c = 18.218 Å α = 90°, β = 125.21°, γ = 90°

Thermochemistry
Heat capacity (C)	118.5 J/mol K
Std enthalpy of formation (Δ_{f}H^{⦵}_{298})	−1075 kJ/mol
- Except where otherwise noted, data are given for materials in their standard state (at 25 °C [77 °F], 100 kPa). Infobox references

Iron(II) molybdate is an inorganic compound with the chemical formula FeMoO_{4}. It is a dark brown to yellow solid forming monoclinic crystals.

== Synthesis ==
Iron(II) molybdate is precipitated by the reaction of iron(II) chloride or iron(II) sulfate and sodium molybdate.

Na_{2}MoO_{4} + FeSO_{4} → Na_{2}SO_{4} + FeMoO_{4}
Na_{2}MoO_{4} + FeCl_{2} → 2 NaCl + FeMoO_{4}

== Applications ==
FeMoO_{4} has been used as relatively stable active material for anodes in Li-ion batteries for conversion reaction, as anode material in aqueous supercapacitors due to fast redox reactions and as catalyst for oxygen evolution in alkaline solutions.
