= Achim Müller =

German scientist (1938–2024)

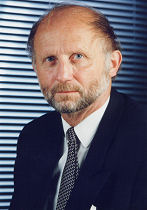
- Born: 14 February 1938; Detmold, Gau Westphalia-North, Germany
- Died: 28 February 2024 (aged 86)
- Education: University of Göttingen
- Known for: Oxide and sulfides of molybdenum
- Scientific career
- Fields: Chemistry, Nanoscience
- Workplaces: Bielefeld University

Achim Müller (14 February 1938 – 28 February 2024) was a German inorganic chemist. Mainly as a professor at Bielefeld University, he contributed extensively to the chemistry of molybdenum oxides and sulfides. He died on 28 February 2024, at the age of 86.

== Research contributions ==
=== Oxide clusters ===
In the area of polyoxometalates, he claimed to have identified the structure of one form of molybdenum blue.

His later research related mainly to the synthesis of spherical porous metal oxide nanocapsules Mo_{132} Keplerates. He also investigated isopolyoxovanadates has provided some of the most instructive examples of host-guest inorganic chemistry, leading to the recognition that a polyoxometalate is a supramolecular species involving a negatively charged host cage and a negatively charged encapsulated guest, and hence opening a new era in polyoxometalate chemistry. The template self-organization of an ”electronically inverse host” around a negatively charged guest might seem somewhat puzzling: According to theoretical studies, this follows from the fact that electrostatic repulsion is overcome by maximizing the molecular electrostatic potential at the guest.

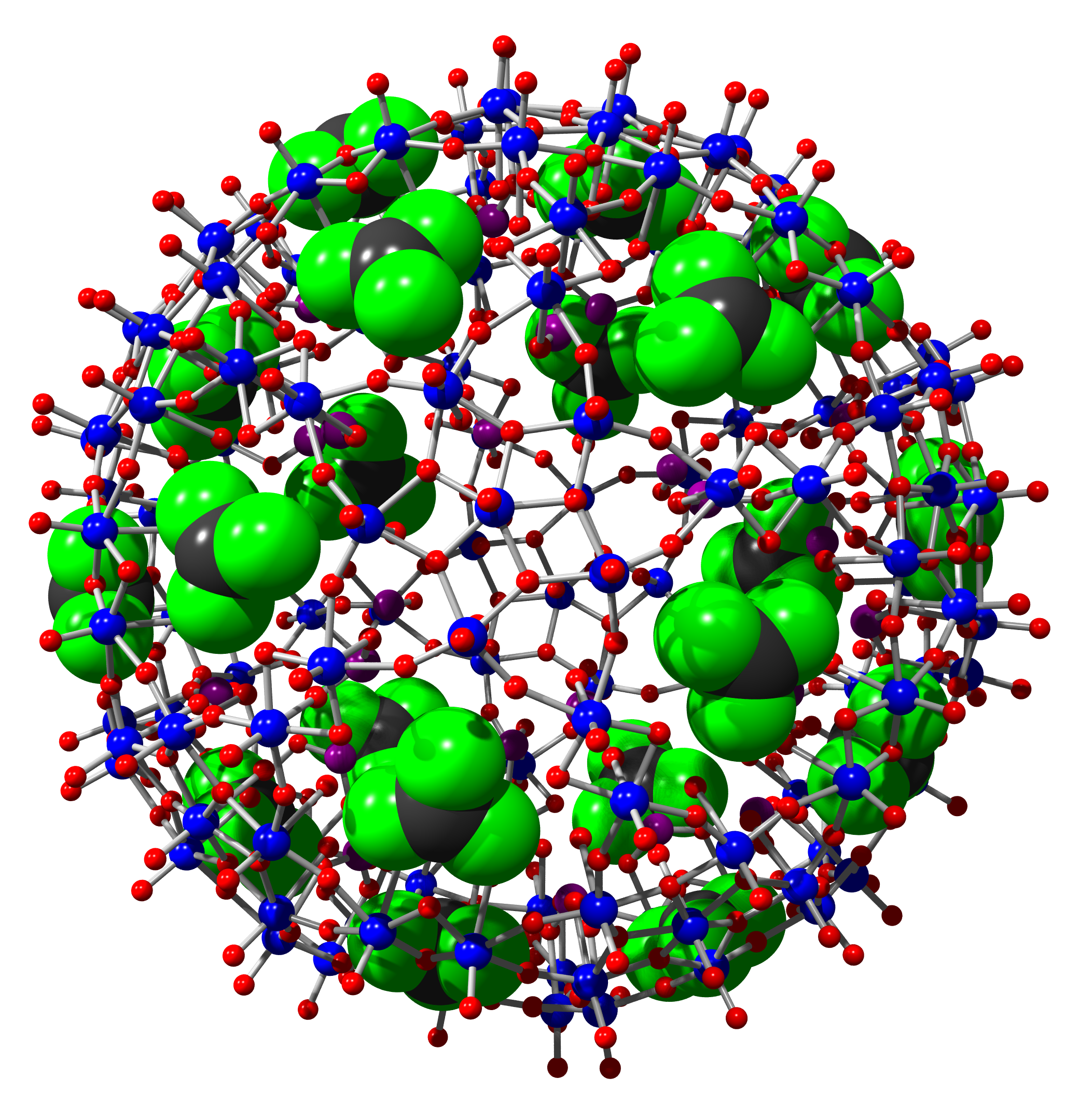
Porous nanosized spherical polyoxomolybdate based capsule Mo_{132}: the 20 stepwise closable pores with crown-ether function are filled with guanidinium cation-guests (sphere surface supramolecular chemistry).

His later research related mainly to bottom-up pathways towards tailor-made spherical porous metal oxide Mo_{132} "Keplerates", wheel-shaped cluster Mo_{154},(Refs.) and hedgehog-shaped cluster Mo_{368}.).

=== Sulfides ===
Müller also reported many new types of transition metal sulphur compounds. He had also strong interest in history and philosophy of science.

== Academic career ==
Achim Müller studied chemistry and physics at the University of Göttingen and received there his PhD degree (1965) and the Habilitation (1967). In 1971, he became professor at the University of Dortmund and in 1977 professor of Inorganic Chemistry at Bielefeld University. In 2006 he was awarded the Manchot-Forschungsprofessur of the Technical University of Munich.

== Personal life ==
Müller enjoyed ancient Greek philosophy, classical music, and mountain hiking. He had a passion for woodland birds from his early childhood, a pastime which his father cherished also. In his professional life, he was attentive to recognition.

== Recognition ==
- Member, German Academy of Sciences Leopoldina,
- Member, Polish Academy of Sciences
- Member, The Indian National Science Academy
- Member, National Academy of Exact Physical and Natural Sciences in Argentina
- Member, Academia Europaea.

Honorary degrees: Russian Academy of Sciences (RAS), Université Pierre et Marie Curie, Paris, National University of La Plata.

- Alfred Stock Memorial Prize 2000
- Prix Gay-Lussac/Humboldt 2001
- Sir Geoffrey Wilkinson Prize 2001
- Centenary Medal of the Royal Society of Chemistry 2008/9, London.
- Honorary Fellow of the Chemical Research Society of India.
