= Sodium molybdate =

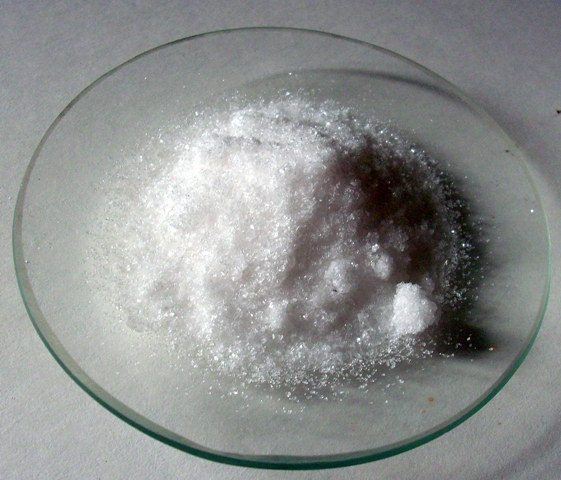
- Sodium molybdate

Names
- IUPAC name Sodium molybdate
- Other names Disodium molybdate

Identifiers
CAS Number	7631-95-0; 10102-40-6 (dihydrate)
3D model (JSmol)	Interactive image
ChEBI	CHEBI:75215
ChemSpider	55350
ECHA InfoCard	100.028.683
EC Number	231-551-7
PubChem CID	61424
RTECS number	QA5075000
UNII	948QAQ08I1; 8F2SXI1704 (dihydrate)
CompTox Dashboard (EPA)	DTXSID2052788
- InChI: InChI=1S/Mo.2Na.4O/q;2*+1;;;2*-1
- SMILES: [O-][Mo](=O)(=O)[O-].[Na+].[Na+]

Properties
Chemical formula	Na_{2}MoO_{4}
Molar mass	205.92 g/mol (anhydrous); 241.95 g/mol (dihydrate)
Appearance	White powder
Density	3.78 g/cm^{3}, solid
Melting point	687 °C (1,269 °F; 960 K)
Solubility in water	84 g/100 ml (100 °C)
Refractive index (n_{D})	1.714

Hazards
- GHS labelling
Pictograms	(GHS07: Exclamation mark)
Signal word	Warning
Hazard statements	H315, H319, H332, H335
Precautionary statements	P261, P264, P264+P265, P271, P280, P302+P352, P304+P340, P305+P351+P338, P317, P319, P321, P332+P317, P337+P317, P362+P364, P403+P233, P405, P501
NFPA 704 (fire diamond)	2 0 0
Flash point	Non-flammable
- Lethal dose or concentration (LD, LC)
LD_{50} (median dose)	4000 mg/kg (rat, oral)
LC_{50} (median concentration)	>2080 mg/m^{3} (rat, 4 hr)
Safety data sheet (SDS)	External MSDS

Related compounds
Other anions	Sodium chromate Sodium tungstate
Other cations	Ammonium molybdate
- Except where otherwise noted, data are given for materials in their standard state (at 25 °C [77 °F], 100 kPa). verify (what is ?) Infobox references

Sodium molybdate, Na_{2}MoO_{4}, is useful as a source of molybdenum. This white, crystalline salt is often encountered as the dihydrate, Na_{2}MoO_{4}·2H_{2}O.

== Structure ==
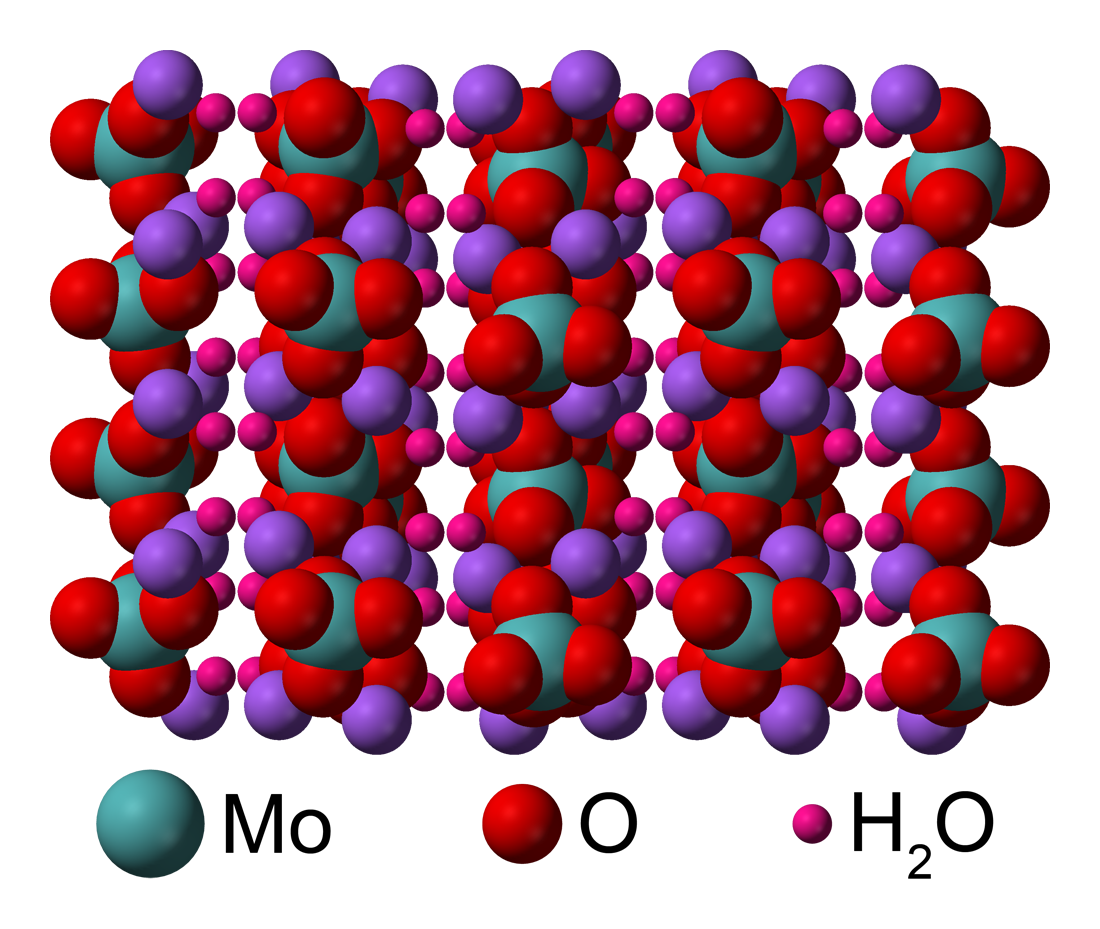
structure of solid sodiium molybdate dihydrate.

In aqueous solution, sodium molybdate features dissociated sodium ions and tetrahedral molybdate (MoO^{2−}_{4}), which adopts a sulfate-like structure. The solid dihydrate material has a complex structure typical for alkali metal salts of oxyanions. The MoO^{2−}_{4} subunits are tetrahedral with Mo-O distances near 178 pm.

== Preparation ==
Dissolution of MoO_{3} in sodium hydroxide at 50–70 °C followed by crystallizing the filtered product. If crystallized below 10 °C, the decahydrate forms. Above 10 °C, the dihydate crystallizes. The anhydrous salt is obtained by heating this product at 100 °C.

$$\ce{MoO3 + 2NaOH + H2O -> Na2MoO4*2H2O}$$

== Uses ==
The agriculture industry uses 500 tons per year as a fertilizer. In particular, its use has been suggested for treatment of whiptail in broccoli and cauliflower in molybdenum-deficient soils. However, care must be taken because at a level of 0.3 ppm sodium molybdate can cause copper deficiencies in animals, particularly cattle.

It is used in industry for corrosion inhibition, as it is a non-oxidizing anodic inhibitor. The addition of sodium molybdate significantly reduces the nitrite requirement of fluids inhibited with nitrite-amine, and improves the corrosion protection of carboxylate salt fluids. In industrial water treatment applications where galvanic corrosion is a potential due to bimetallic construction, the application of sodium molybdate is preferred over sodium nitrite. Sodium molybdate has the advantage in that the dosing of lower ppm's of molybdate allow for lower conductivity of the circulating water. Sodium molybdate at levels of 50-100 ppm offer the same levels of corrosion inhibition as sodium nitrite at levels of 800+ ppm. By utilizing lower concentrations of sodium molybdate, conductivity is kept at a minimum and thus galvanic corrosion potentials are decreased.

== Reactions ==
When treated with sodium borohydride, molybdate is reduced to molybdenum(IV) oxide:

$$\ce{Na2MoO4 + NaBH4 + 2H2O -> NaBO2 + MoO2 + 2NaOH + 3H2}$$

Sodium molybdate reacts with the acids of dithiophosphates:

$$\ce{Na2MoO4 + (RO)2PS2H  -> [MoO2(S2P(OR)2)2]}$$

with R = Me, Et

which further reacts to form [MoO_{3}(S_{2}P(OR)_{2})_{4}].

== Safety ==
Sodium molybdate supports the biosynthesis of molybdoenzymes, which are found in all higher forms of life. The LC50 for freshwater fish ranges from 60 to 7630 mg/L. The toxicity of soluble molybdate to marine organisms has also been reported.
