= Molybdenum blue =

Pigment

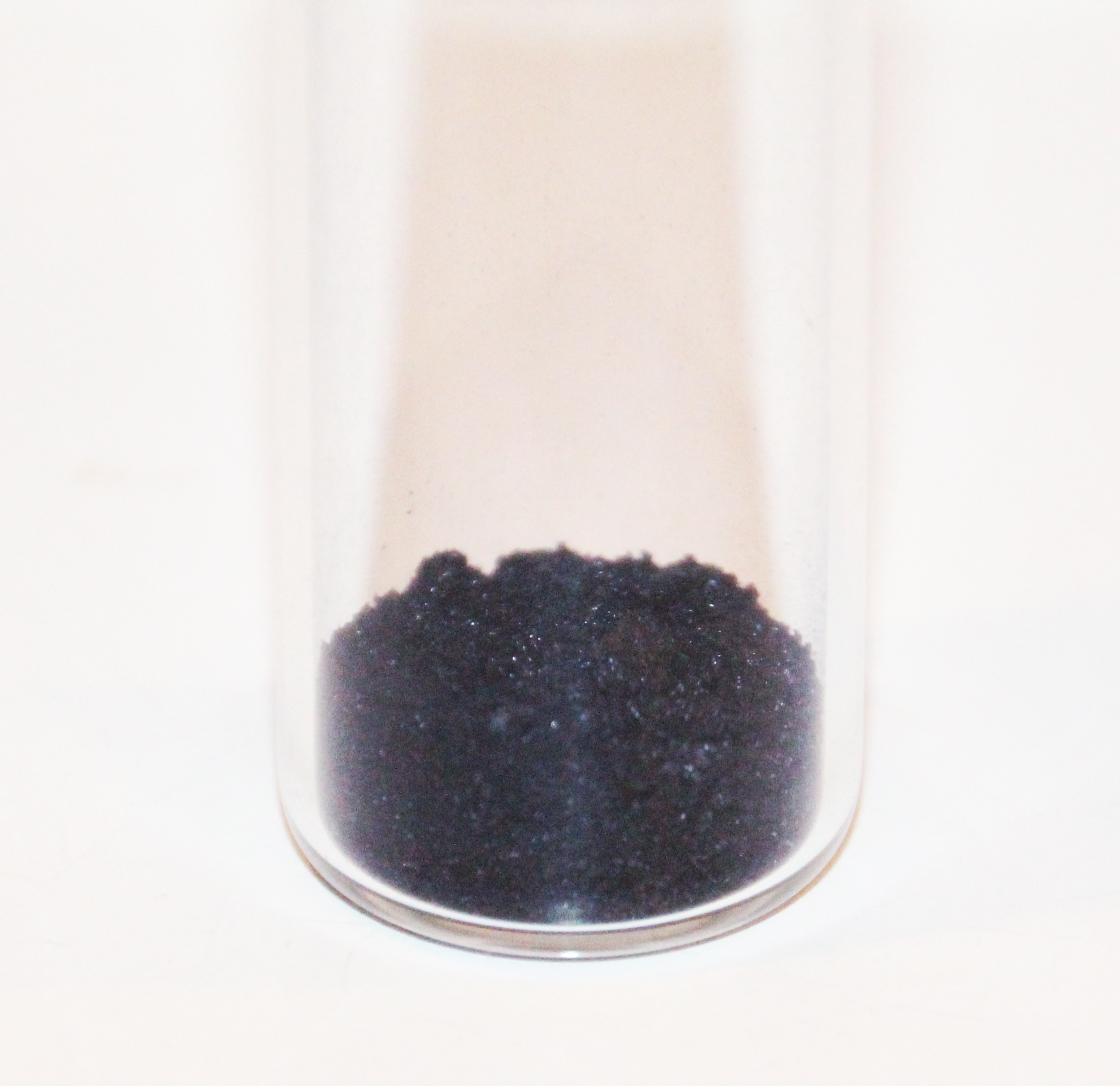
A sample of one kind of molybdenum blue with the formula Na_{15}[Mo^{VI}_{126}Mo^{V}_{28}O_{462}H_{14}(H_{2}O)_{70}]_{1/2} [Mo^{VI}_{124}Mo^{V}_{28}O_{457}H_{14}(H_{2}O)_{68}]_{1/2}.

Molybdenum blue is a term applied to:

- reduced heteropolymolybdate complexes, polyoxometalates containing Mo(V), Mo(VI), and a hetero atom such as phosphorus or silicon
- reduced isopolymolybdate complexes, polyoxometalates containing Mo(V), Mo(VI) formed when solutions of Mo(VI) are reduced
- a blue pigment containing molybdenum(VI) oxide

The "heteropoly-molybdenum blues", are used extensively in analytical chemistry and as catalysts. The formation of "isopoly-molybdenum blues" which are intense blue has been used as a sensitive test for reducing reagents. They have recently been shown to contain very large anionic species based on the so-called "big wheel" containing 154 Mo atoms, with a formula [Mo_{154}O_{462}H_{14}(H_{2}O)_{70}]^{14−}.

The molybdenum blue pigment is historically documented but may not be in use today.

== Heteropoly-molybdenum blues ==
The first heteropoly molybdate and first heteropolymetallate, yellow ammonium phosphomolybdate, (NH_{4})_{3}PMo_{12}O_{40} was discovered by Berzelius in 1826. The phosphorus atom in the anion is termed the heteroatom, other heteroatoms are silicon and arsenic. The heteropoly-molybdenum blues have structures based on the Keggin structure. The blue colour arises because the near-colourless anion, such as the phosphomolybdate anion, PMo_{12}O^{3−}_{40}, can accept more electrons (i.e. be reduced) to form an intensely coloured mixed-valence complex. This can occur in one electron or two electron steps. The reduction process is reversible and the structure of the anion is essentially unchanged.

PMo^{VI}_{12}O^{3−}_{40} + 4 e^{−} ⇌ PMo^{V}_{4}Mo^{VI}_{8}O^{7−}_{40}

The structure of the anion, PMo^{V}_{4}Mo^{VI}_{8}O^{7−}_{40}, has been determined in the solid state and is a β-isomer (i.e. with one of the four groups of edge-shared octahedra on the α-Keggin ion rotated through 60°). Similar structures have been found with silicon, germanium or arsenic heteroatoms.

The intense blue colour of the reduced anion is the basis for the use of heteropoly-molybdenum blues in quantitative and qualitative analytical techniques. This property is exploited as follows:

- the sample to be analysed is reacted to produce the reduced blue heteropoly-molybdate in order to:
  - detect the presence of a hetero atom in e.g. a spot test
  - measure the amount of a hetero atom present in the sample colorimetrically
- the sample is added to a solution of the near colourless, unreduced complex in order to:
  - detect the presence of a reducing compound e.g. a reducing sugar such as glucose
  - measure the amount of a reducing compound in a two step procedure

== Uses in quantitative analysis ==
=== Colorimetric determination of P, As, Si and Ge ===
The determination of phosphorus, arsenic, silicon and germanium are examples of the use of heteropoly-molybdenum blue in analytical chemistry. The following example describes the determination of phosphorus. A sample containing the phosphate is mixed with an acid solution of Mo^{VI}, for example ammonium molybdate, to produce PMo_{12}O^{3−}_{40}, which has an α-Keggin structure. This anion is then reduced by, for example, ascorbic acid or SnCl_{2}, to form the blue coloured β-keggin ion, PMo_{12}O^{7−}_{40}. The amount of the blue coloured ion produced is proportional to the amount of phosphate present and the absorption can be measured using a colorimeter to determine the amount of phosphorus. Examples of procedures are:

- the analysis of phosphate in sea water.
- standard methods for determining phosphorus and silicon content of metals and metal ores. (e.g. BSI and ISO standards)
- the determination of germanium and arsenic

The comparison of the measured absorption against readings taken for analyses of standard solutions means that a detailed understanding of the structure of the blue complex was unnecessary.

This colorimetric method is ineffective when comparable amounts of arsenate are present in solution with phosphate. This is due to the strong chemical likeness of arsenate and phosphate. The resultant molybdenum blue for arsenate, using the same procedure, does produce a slightly different spectral signature, however.

Recently, paper-based devices have become very attractive to use colorimetric determination for making inexpensive, disposable and convenient analytical devices for the determination of reactive phosphate in the field. By using an inexpensive and portable infrared Lightbox system, one can create uniform and repeatable lighting environments to take advantage of the peak absorbance of the molybdenum blue reaction in order to improve limit of detection of paper-based devices. This system may act as a substitute for expensive, lab-equipment spectrometers.

=== Colorimetric determination of glucose ===
The Folin–Wu and the Somogyi–Nelson methods are both based on the same principles. In the first step, glucose (or a reducing sugar) is oxidised using a solution of Cu(II) ion, which is reduced to Cu(I) by the process. In the second step, the Cu(I) ions are then oxidised back to Cu(II) using a colourless hetero-polymolybdate complex, which is, in the process, reduced to give the characteristic blue colour. Finally the absorption of the hetero-poly molybdenum blue is measured using a colorimeter and compared to standards prepared from reacting sugar solutions of known concentration, to determine the amount of reducing-sugar present.
The Folin–Wu method uses a reagent that contains sodium tungstate. The exact nature of the blue complex in this procedure is not known.
The Somogyi-Nelson method uses an arsenomolybdate complex formed by the reaction of ammonium molybdate, (NH_{4})_{6} Mo_{7}O_{24}, with sodium arsenate, Na_{2}HAsO_{7}.

=== Colorimetric determination of some drugs containing catechol ===
Some drugs that contain a catechol group react with phosphomolybdic acid (H_{3}PMo_{12}O_{40}) to give the heteropoly-molybdenum blue colour. Micro quantities of the drugs can be determined.

== Uses in qualitative analysis ==
Examples of simple tests are shown below that rely on the production of the molybdenum blue colour either due to reduction:

- tests for Sn(II) and Sb(III)
- tests for organic reducing agents

or by detection of the heteroatom

- silicate
- phosphate

Dittmer's spray reagent for phospholipids is used in thin layer chromatography to detect phospholipids. The spray reagent is prepared as follows:

- Molybdenum(VI) oxide, MoO_{3}, is dissolved in sulfuric acid
- A second solution is made up from molybdenum metal dissolved in some of the first solution.
- The spray is made up of a diluted mixture of the first and second solutions.

When applied to the TLC plate, compounds containing phosphate ester show up immediately as blue spots.

== Isopoly molybdenum blues ==
The isopoly-molybdenum blues have been known for many years. They are the cause of the "blue waters" found near Idaho Springs, known to Native Americans. They were first documented by Scheele and Berzelius. The compounds responsible for the blue colour were not known until 1995. Before then it was well known that there were polymolybdates of Mo(VI). Molybdenum(VI)oxide, MoO_{3}, when dissolved in aqueous alkali forms the tetrahedral molybdate anion, MoO^{2−}_{4}. Dissolving molybdate salts in strong acid produces "molybdic acid", MoO_{3}·2H_{2}O. In between these extremes of pH, polymeric ions are produced which are mostly built from MoO_{6} octahedral units sharing corners and edges. Examples include Mo_{7}O^{6−}_{24}, Mo_{8}O^{4−}_{26} and Mo_{36}O_{112}(H_{2}O)^{8−}_{16}, which contain the {(Mo)Mo_{5}}-type unit comprising a central MoO_{7} pentagonal bipyramid sharing edges with five MoO_{6} octahedra. The later unit occurs also in the giant mixed-valence molybdenum blue species [H_{x}Mo_{368}O_{1032}(H_{2}O)_{240}(SO_{4})_{48}]^{48−} (x ≈ 16) as well as in the cluster described in the next section. The molybdenum blue species are obtained by reduction of acidified molybdate(VI) solutions.

== The big wheel ==
The first publication of the structure of wheel shaped cluster anion, first determined for the nitrosyl derivative by Achim Müller et al. was announced in New Scientist as "Big Wheel rolls back the molecular frontier". Further work by the same group then refined the initial findings and determined the structure of the wheel produced in molybdate solutions as the poly anion [Mo_{154}O_{462}H_{14}(H_{2}O)_{70}]^{14−}. The Mo_{154}-type cluster was then shown to be the basic structural type of molybdenum blue compounds obtained under slightly different conditions.

The structure of the big wheel is constructed from units containing 11 Mo atoms ({Mo_{11}}-type units), 14 of which are linked together to form the {Mo_{154}}-type cluster that has an external diameter of 3.4 nm. (12 {Mo_{11}}-type units are also involved in the construction of higher symmetrical spherical systems called Keplerates) These units consist of a central MoO_{7} bipyramid sharing edges with 5 MoO_{6} octahedra (an illustration of this is on page 155 of the review). With 5 more linking MoO_{6} octahedra the repeating {Mo_{11}}-type unit is built up.

== The spherical vesicle ==
Along with other aggregates, a hollow, spherical structure self-assembles from approximately 1,165 Mo_{154} wheels. This was termed a vesicle by analogy with lipid vesicles. Unlike lipid vesicles that are stabilised by hydrophobic interactions it is believed that the vesicle is stabilised by an interplay of van der Waals attraction, long-range electrostatic repulsion with further stabilization arising from hydrogen bonding involving water molecules encapsulated between the wheel-shaped clusters and in the vesicles' interior. The radius of the vesicle is 45 nm.

== Molybdenum blue pigment ==
A pigment termed molybdenum blue is recorded in 1844 as a mixture of molybdenum with "oxyde of tin or phosphate of lime". An alternative formulation involves "digesting" molybdenum sulfide with nitric acid to form molybdic acid, which is then mixed with tin filings and a little muriatic acid (HCl). This is evaporated and heated with alumina. A 1955 paper states that molybdenum blue is unstable and is not used commercially as a pigment. The chemistry of these pigments has not been investigated.
