= Molybdite =

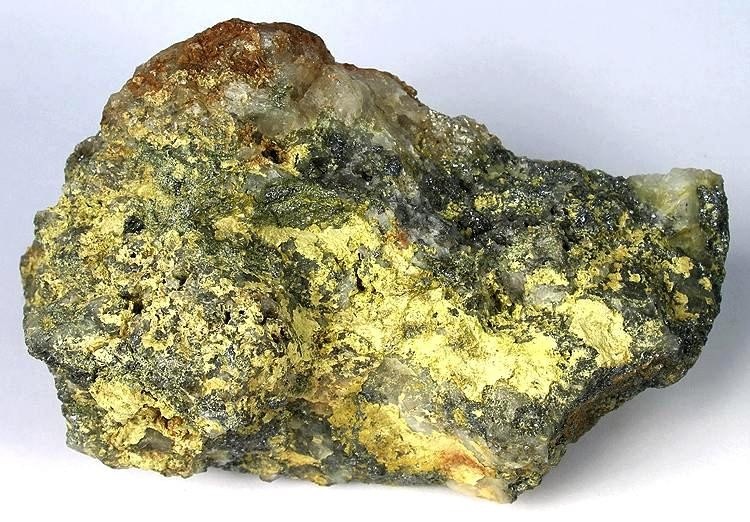
- Molybdite on molybdenite from the Questa Molybdenum Mine (size: 11.0 x 6.7 x 4.1 cm)

General
- Category: Minerals
- Formula: MoO_{3}
- IMA symbol: Myb
- Strunz classification: 4.EA.10
- Crystal system: Orthorhombic
- Crystal class: Dipyramidal (mmm); H-M symbol: (2/m 2/m 2/m)
- Space group: Pbnm
- Unit cell: a = 3.96 Å, b = 13.85 Å, c = 3.69 Å; Z = 4

Identification
- Color: Light greenish yellow to nearly colorless
- Crystal habit: Flattened needles or thin plates may occur in aggregates
- Cleavage: Perfect on {100}, district on {001}
- Tenacity: Flexible
- Mohs scale hardness: 3 - 4
- Luster: Adamantine
- Streak: White
- Diaphaneity: Transparent
- Specific gravity: 4.72
- Optical properties: Biaxial (+)
- Birefringence: High
- 2V angle: Large

Molybdite is the naturally occurring mineral form of molybdenum trioxide MoO_{3}. It occurs as yellow to greenish needles and crystallizes in the orthorhombic crystal system.

== Discovery and occurrence ==
Molybdite was first described in 1854 for and occurrence in quartz veins in the Knöttel area of Krupka, Ore Mountains, Bohemia (today in the Ústí nad Labem Region of the Czech Republic. It occurs in vein cavities and as coatings in molybdenite ore veins and quartz topaz greisens. Associated minerals include molybdenite, betpakdalite and quartz. The similar mineral ferrimolybdite is often misidentified as molybdite.
