= Ammonium heptamolybdate =

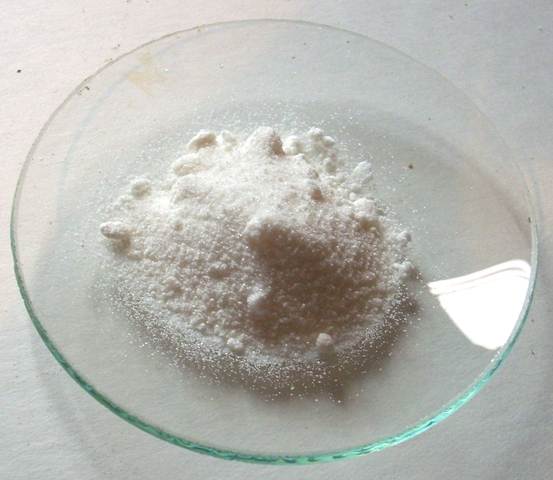

Names
- IUPAC name Ammonium docosaoxoheptamolybdate(6–)
- Other names Ammonium molybdate Ammonium paramolybdate (see text)

Identifiers
CAS Number	12027-67-7; 12054-85-2 (tetrahydrate)
3D model (JSmol)	Interactive image; Interactive image
ChemSpider	23786
ECHA InfoCard	100.031.553
EC Number	234-320-9
PubChem CID	16211167
UNII	21Y68J178E; OGI154X474 (tetrahydrate)
CompTox Dashboard (EPA)	DTXSID40858865 DTXSID5036896, DTXSID40858865
- InChI: InChI=1S/7Mo.6H3N.24H2O/h;;;;;;;6*1H3;24*1H2 Key: QGAVSDVURUSLQK-UHFFFAOYSA-N; InChI=1/7Mo.6H3N.24H2O/h;;;;;;;6*1H3;24*1H2 Key: QGAVSDVURUSLQK-UHFFFAOYAC
- SMILES: [NH4+].[NH4+].[NH4+].[NH4+].[NH4+].[NH4+].[O-][Mo](=O)(=O)[O-].[O-][Mo](=O)(=O)[O-].[O-][Mo](=O)(=O)[O-]; [NH4+].[NH4+].[NH4+].[Mo]3479%12[O+]1[Mo]25([O-])([O-])O[Mo]1%10([O-])([O-])O[Mo]%11([O-])([O-])(O[Mo]8([O-])([O-])(O[Mo]6([O-])([O-])(O[Mo]([O-])([O-])(O2)(O3)[O++]456)[O+]78)[O++]9%10%11)O%12.[NH4+].[NH4+].[NH4+]

Properties
Chemical formula	(NH_{4})_{6}Mo_{7}O_{24}
Molar mass	1163.9 g/mol 1235.86 g/mol (tetrahydrate)
Appearance	white solid
Density	2.498 g/cm^{3}
Melting point	~90 ˚C (loses water molecule); 190 °C (decomp.)
Solubility in water	65.3 g / 100 ml (tetrahydrate)

Hazards
- Occupational safety and health (OHS/OSH)
Main hazards	Irritant
NFPA 704 (fire diamond)	2 0 0
Flash point	Non-flammable
Safety data sheet (SDS)	External MSDS

Related compounds
Other anions	Ammonium orthomolybdate Ammonium dimolybdate
Other cations	Potassium paramolybdate
Related compounds	Molybdenum(VI) oxide Molybdic acid
- Except where otherwise noted, data are given for materials in their standard state (at 25 °C [77 °F], 100 kPa). verify (what is ?) Infobox references

Ammonium heptamolybdate is the inorganic compound whose chemical formula is (NH_{4})_{6}Mo_{7}O_{24}, normally encountered as the tetrahydrate. A dihydrate is also known. It is a colorless solid, often referred to as ammonium paramolybdate or simply as ammonium molybdate, although "ammonium molybdate" can also refer to ammonium orthomolybdate, (NH_{4})_{2}MoO_{4}, and several other compounds. It is one of the more common molybdenum compounds.

== Synthesis ==
Ammonium heptamolybdate is easily prepared by dissolving molybdenum trioxide in an excess of aqueous ammonia and evaporating the solution at room temperature. While the solution evaporates, the excess of ammonia escapes. This method results in the formation of six-sided transparent prisms of the tetrahydrate of ammonium heptamolybdate.

Solutions of ammonium paramolybdate react with acids to form molybdic acid and an ammonium salt. The pH value of a concentrated solution will lie between 5 and 6.

== Structure ==
The compound was first analyzed crystallographically by Lindqvist, but has been reanalyzed. All Mo centers are octahedral. Some oxide ligands are terminal, some doubly bridging, and a few are triply bridging ligands.

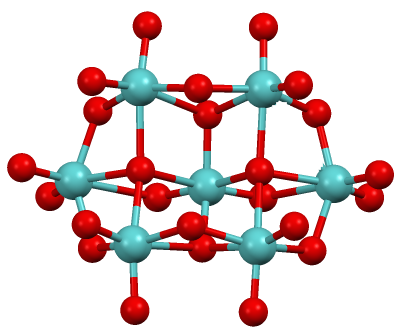
The salt contains the heptamolybdate hexaanion.

== Uses ==
- as an analytical reagent to measure the amount of phosphates, silicates, arsenates and lead in aqueous solution (e.g. pigments, river water, sea water etc.)
- in the production of molybdenum metal and ceramics
- in the preparation of dehydrogenation and desulfurization catalysts
- in the fixing of metals
- in electroplating
- in fertilizers for crops.
- as a negative stain in biological electron microscopy, typically in the 3–5% (vol/vol) concentration range and in the presence of trehalose; or at saturated concentration to perform cryo-negative staining.
- For the detection of recreational drugs as a component of the Froehde reagent

== Related compounds ==
Potassium heptamolybdate, also obtained as the tetrahydrate, is very similar to the ammonium salt.

== Safety ==
Molybdates are typically of low toxicity, so much so that few reports of incidents have ever been reported.
