= Tugarinovite =

Oxide mineral

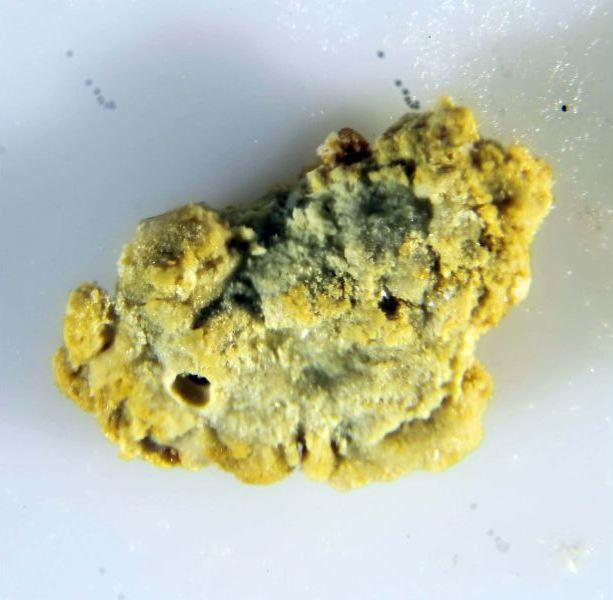
- Tugarinovite

General
- Category: Oxide mineral
- Formula: MoO_{2}
- IMA symbol: Tug
- Strunz classification: 4.DB.05
- Crystal system: Monoclinic
- Crystal class: Prismatic H-M symbol (2/m)
- Space group: P2_{1}/c (no. 14)
- Unit cell: a = 5.6 Å, b = 4.85 Å, c = 5.53 Å; β = 119.37°

Identification
- Color: Dark lilac-brown
- Crystal habit: Crystals are tabular striated prisms
- Twinning: Polysynthetic
- Mohs scale hardness: 4.6
- Luster: Greasy to metallic
- Streak: Greenish gray
- Diaphaneity: Semitransparent
- Specific gravity: 6.58 (calculated)
- Optical properties: Biaxial
- Pleochroism: Light gray to dark pink; pale yellow to bluish olive-brown in reflected light

Tugarinovite is a rare molybdenum oxide mineral with formula MoO_{2}. It occurs as a primary mineral phase associated with metasomatism in a sulfur deficient reducing environment. In the type locality it occurs with uraninite, molybdenite, galena, zircon and wulfenite.

Tugarinovite was first described for an occurrence in the Lenskoye molybdenum–uranium deposit in the Amurskaya Oblast, Far-Eastern Region, Russia. It was named for geochemist Ivan Alekseevich Tugarinov of the Vernadskii Institute in Moscow. In addition to its type locality in Russia it has been reported from the Allende meteorite in Chihuahua, Mexico, the Nansei Archipelago of Japan and Bohemia in the Czech Republic.
