= Molybdic acid =

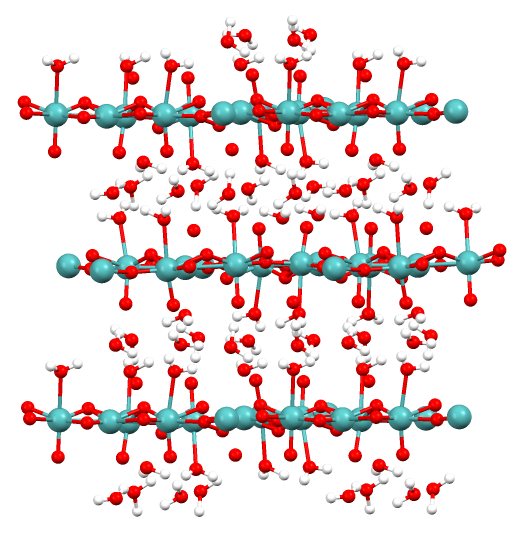

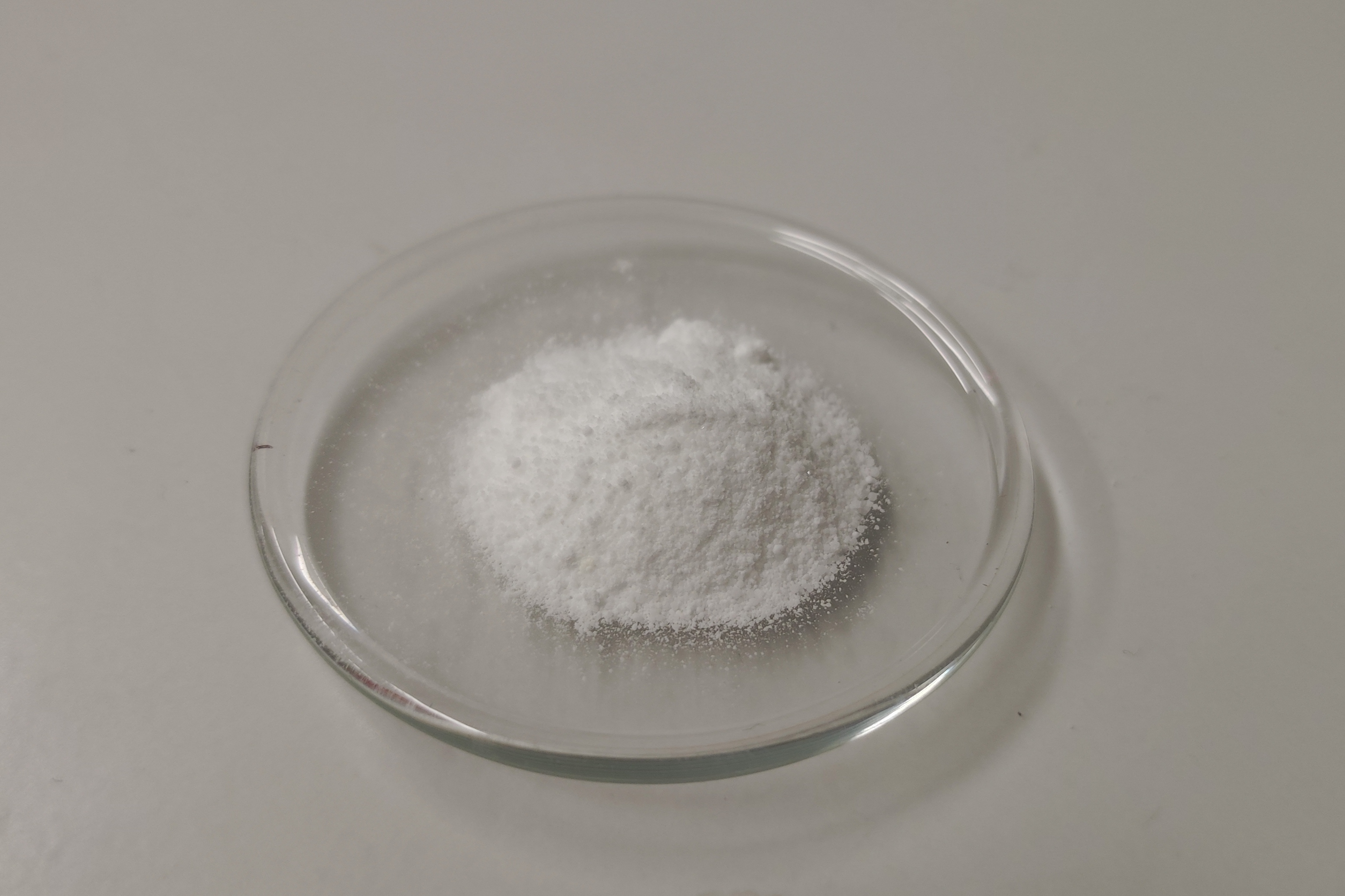

Names
- Other names Molybdic(VI) acid

Identifiers
CAS Number	7782-91-4; monohydrate: 13462-95-8; dihydrate: 25942-34-1
3D model (JSmol)	Interactive image
ChEBI	CHEBI:25371
ChemSpider	74188
ECHA InfoCard	100.029.063
EC Number	231-970-5
KEGG	C06232
PubChem CID	82208
UNII	I96N991J1N
CompTox Dashboard (EPA)	DTXSID20894105
- InChI: InChI=1S/Mo.2H2O.2O/h;2*1H2;;/q+2;;;;/p-2 Key: VLAPMBHFAWRUQP-UHFFFAOYSA-L; InChI=1/Mo.2H2O.2O/h;2*1H2;;/q+2;;;;/p-2/rH2MoO4/c2-1(3,4)5/h2-3H Key: VLAPMBHFAWRUQP-LHLUJLTBAG
- SMILES: O=[Mo](=O)(O)O

Properties
Chemical formula	MoO_{3}·H_{2}O
Molar mass	161.95 g mol^{−1}
Appearance	white crystals (anhydrous) yellow crystals (monohydrate)
Density	3.112 g/cm^{3} (anhydrous); 3.124 g/cm^{3} (monohydrate)
Melting point	300 °C (572 °F; 573 K)
Solubility in water	1510 mg dm^{−3} Soluble in 10% ammonia 35gm/lt

Structure
Crystal structure	hexagonal (anhydrous) monoclinic (monohydrate)

Hazards
- GHS labelling
Pictograms	(GHS07: Exclamation mark) (GHS08: Health hazard)
Signal word	Warning
Hazard statements	H319, H335, H373
- Except where otherwise noted, data are given for materials in their standard state (at 25 °C [77 °F], 100 kPa). Infobox references

Molybdic acid refers to hydrated forms of molybdenum trioxide and related species. The monohydrate (MoO_{3}·H_{2}O) and the dihydrate (MoO_{3}·2H_{2}O) are well characterized. They are yellow diamagnetic solids.

== Structure of the solids ==
Portion of one layer of hydrated molybdic acid, MoO_{3}·(H_{2}O)_{2}.

Solid forms of molybdic acid are coordination polymers. The monohydrate MoO_{3}·H_{2}O consists of layers of octahedrally coordinated MoO_{5}·(H_{2}O) units where 4 vertices are shared. The dihydrate (image shown above) has the same layer structure with the "extra" H_{2}O molecule intercalated between the layers.

== Structure of molybdic acid in solution ==
In acidified aqueous solutions of molybdic acid, the complex MoO_{3}(H_{2}O)_{3} is observed. Once again, molybdenum adopts octahedral molecular geometry, probably with three oxo ligands and three aquo ligands.

The salts of molybdic acid are called molybdates. They arise by adding base to solutions of molybdic acid.

== Applications ==
Many molybdenum oxides are used as heterogeneous catalysts, e.g. for oxidations. Molybdic acid and its salts are used to make the Froehde reagent for the presumptive identification of alkaloids.
