= Ammonium phosphomolybdate =

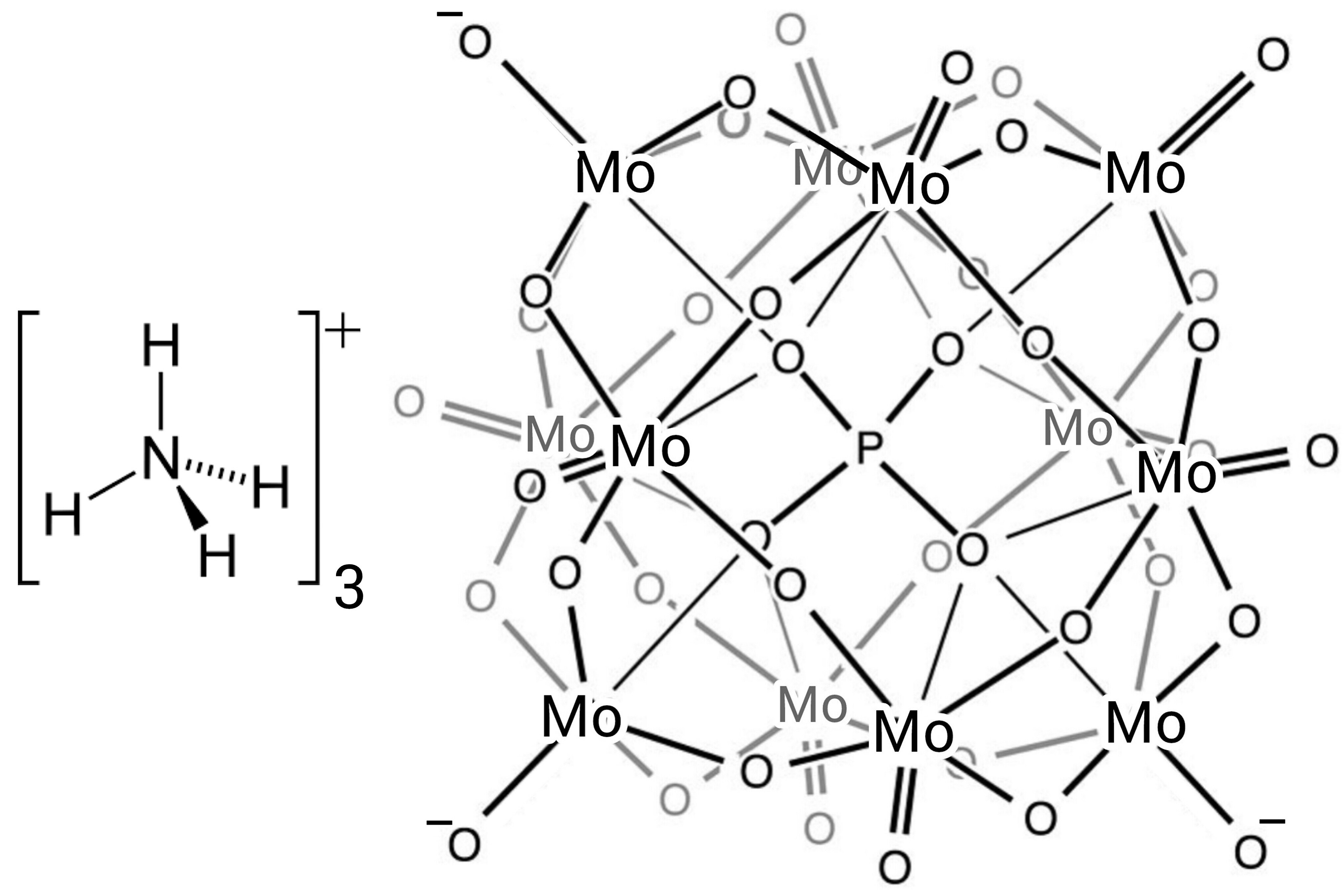

Names
- Other names Ammonium molybdophosphate Triammonium 12-molybdophosphate

Identifiers
CAS Number	12026-66-3; 54723-94-3 (hydrate)
3D model (JSmol)	Interactive image
ChemSpider	21241450
ECHA InfoCard	100.031.545
EC Number	234-714-0
PubChem CID	90479084
UNII	F7YCY6MSAO
- InChI: InChI=1S/12Mo.3H3N.H3O4P.36O/c;;;;;;;;;;;;;;;1-5(2,3)4;;;;;;;;;;;;;;;;;;;;;;;;;;;;;;;;;;;;/h;;;;;;;;;;;;3*1H3;(H3,1,2,3,4);;;;;;;;;;;;;;;;;;;;;;;;;;;;;;;;;;;; Key: RIAJLMJRHLGNMZ-UHFFFAOYSA-N
- SMILES: [NH4+].[NH4+].[NH4+].[O-]P(=O)([O-])[O-].O=[Mo](=O)=O.O=[Mo](=O)=O.O=[MO](=O)=O.O=[Mo](=O)=O.O=[Mo](=O)=O.O=[Mo](=O)=O.O=[Mo](=O)=O.O=[Mo](=O)=O.O=[Mo](=O)=O.O=[Mo](=O)=O.O=[Mo](=O)=O.O=[Mo](=O)=O

Properties
Chemical formula	(NH_{4})_{3}PMo_{12}O_{40}
Molar mass	1876.35 g/mol
Appearance	Yellow crystals
Melting point	Decomposes

Hazards
- GHS labelling
Pictograms	(GHS07: Exclamation mark)
Signal word	Warning
Hazard statements	H315, H319, H335
Precautionary statements	P261, P305+P351+P338
- Except where otherwise noted, data are given for materials in their standard state (at 25 °C [77 °F], 100 kPa). verify (what is ?) Infobox references

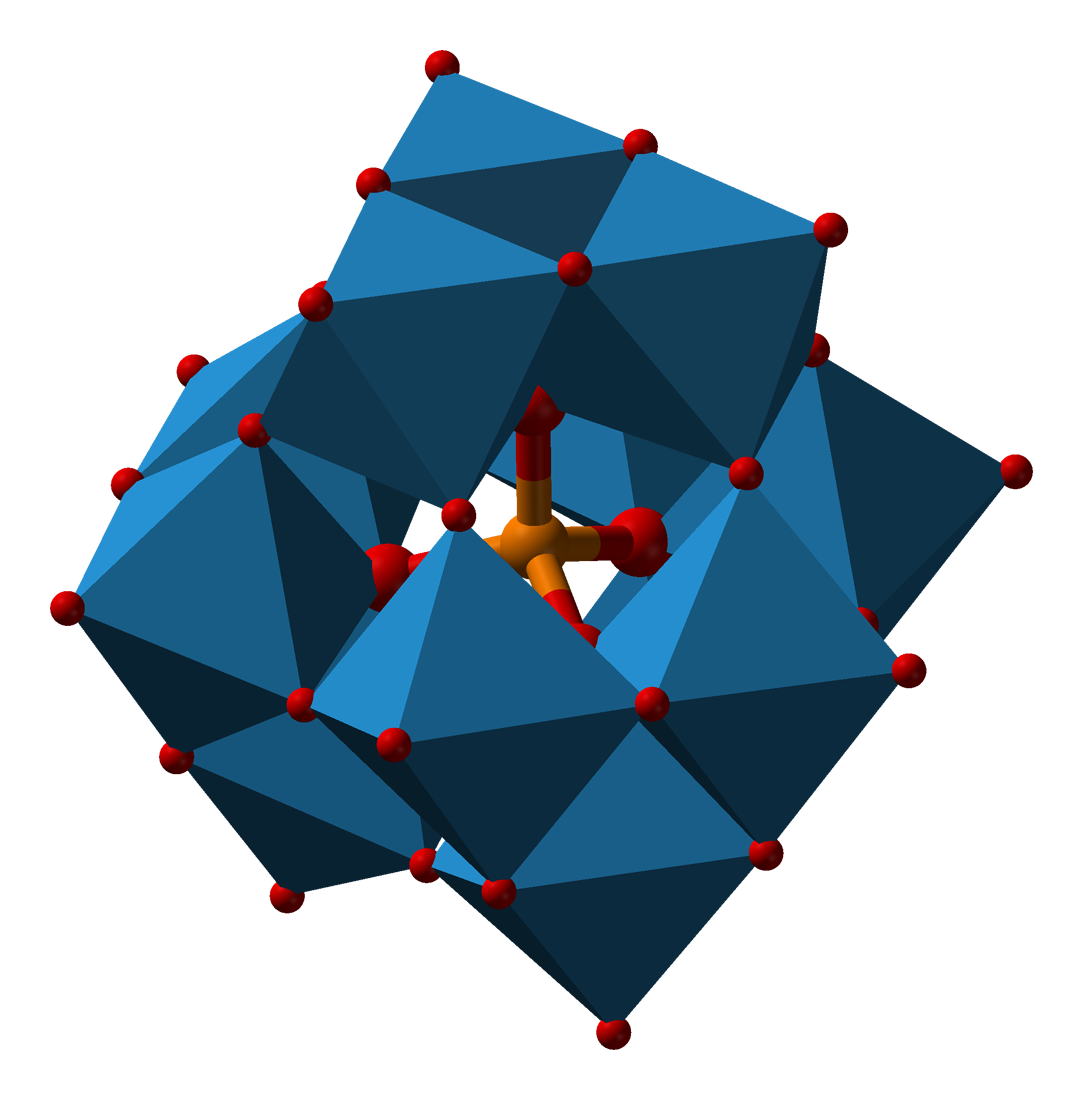
The phosphomolybdate ion, [PMo_{12}O_{40}]^{3−}.

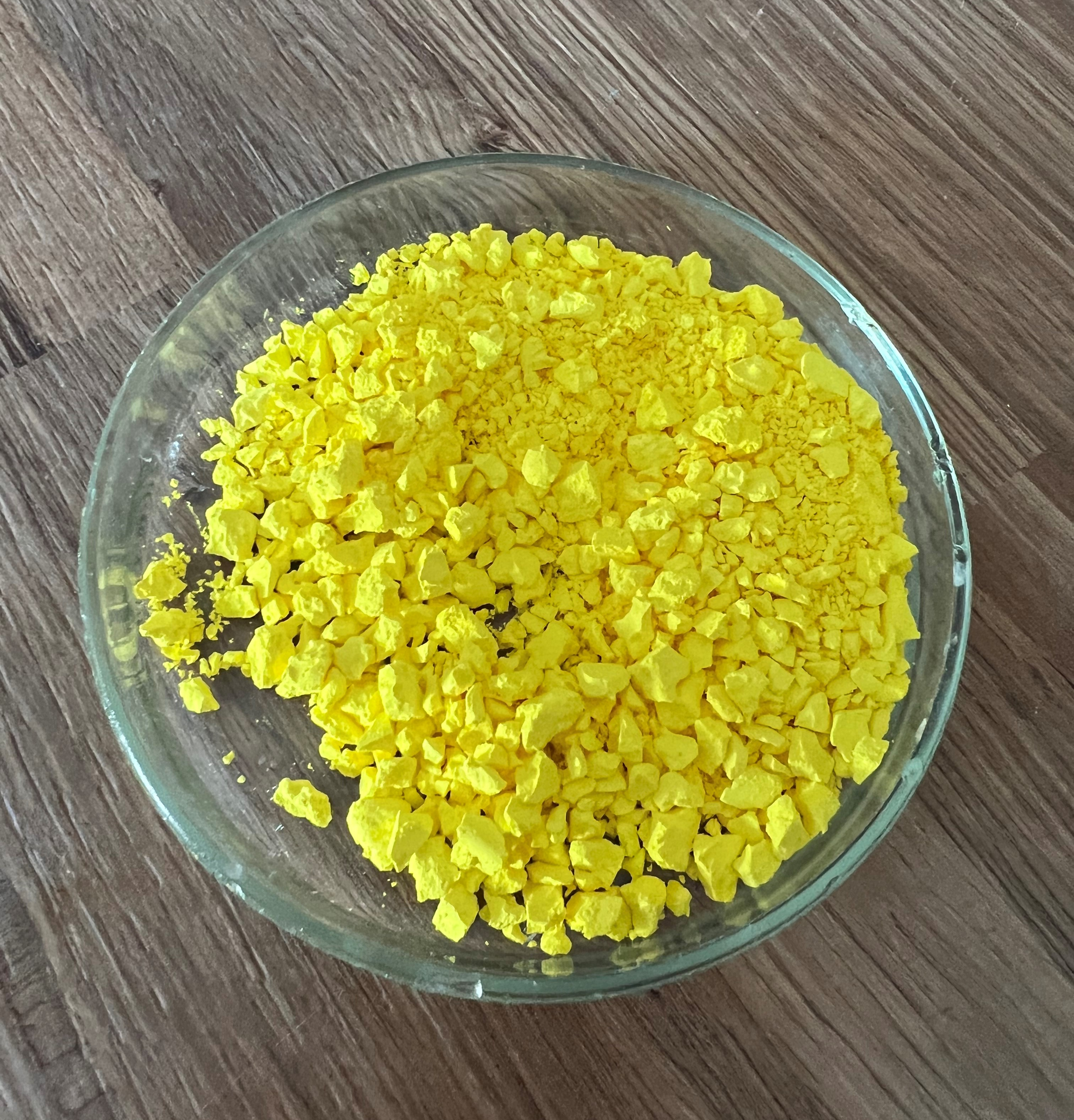
Ammonium phosphomolybdate.

Ammonium phosphomolybdate is the inorganic salt of phosphomolybdic acid with the chemical formula (NH_{4})_{3}PMo_{12}O_{40}. The salt contains the phosphomolybdate anion, a well known heteropolymetalate of the Keggin structural class.

== Synthesis ==
Ammonium phosphomolybdate can be made by heating ammonium orthomolybdate combined with phosphoric acid and nitric acid, yielding ammonium nitrate, water, and a yellow precipitate of ammonium phosphomolybdate is obtained.

12 (NH_{4})_{6}Mo_{7}O_{24}(H_{2}O)_{4} + 7 Na_{2}HPO_{4}(H_{2}O) + 65 HNO_{3} → 7 (NH_{4})_{3}Mo_{12}PO_{40} + 51 NH_{4}NO_{3} + 14 NaNO_{3} + 91 H_{2}O

Normally, it often exists as a hexahydrate, a dark yellow fine crystal which is poorly soluble in water.

It is also obtained as a test result for phosphate ions.
