= Molybdenum trioxide =

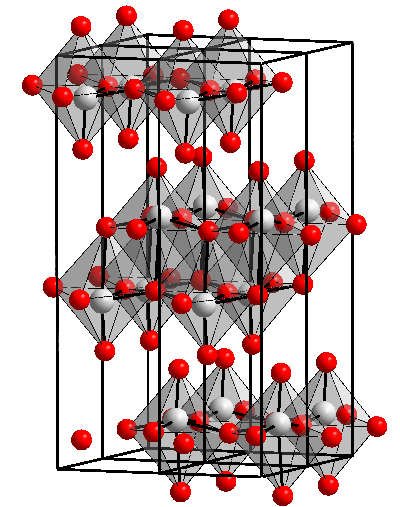

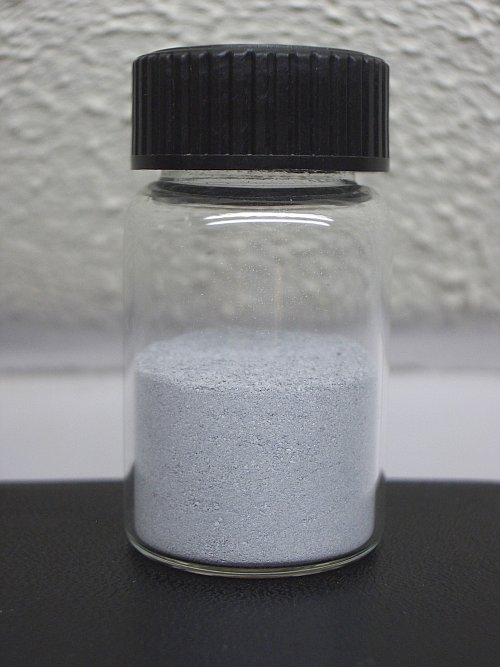

Names
- IUPAC name Molybdenum trioxide
- Other names Molybdic anhydride Molybdite; Molybdic trioxide Molybdenum(VI) oxide

Identifiers
CAS Number	1313-27-5 anhydrous
3D model (JSmol)	Interactive image
ChEBI	CHEBI:30627
ChemSpider	14118
ECHA InfoCard	100.013.823
EC Number	215-204-7
PubChem CID	14802
UNII	22FQ3F03YS
UN number	3288
CompTox Dashboard (EPA)	DTXSID7020899
- InChI: InChI=1S/Mo.3O Key: JKQOBWVOAYFWKG-UHFFFAOYSA-N
- SMILES: O=[Mo](=O)=O

Properties
Chemical formula	MoO_{3}
Molar mass	143.95 g·mol^{−1}
Appearance	yellow solid
Odor	odorless
Density	4.70 g/cm^{3}
Melting point	802 °C (1,476 °F; 1,075 K)
Boiling point	1,155 °C (2,111 °F; 1,428 K)(sublimes)
Solubility in water	1.066 g/L (18 °C); 4.90 g/L (28 °C); 20.55 g/L (70 °C)
Band gap	>3 eV (direct)
Magnetic susceptibility (χ)	+3.0·10^{−6} cm^{3}/mol

Structure
Crystal structure	Orthorhombic, oP16
Space group	Pnma, No. 62
Lattice constant	a = 1.402 nm, b = 0.37028 nm, c = 0.39663 nm
Formula units (Z)	4
Coordination geometry	see text

Thermochemistry
Heat capacity (C)	75.0 J K^{−1} mol^{−1}
Std molar entropy (S^{⦵}_{298})	77.7 J K^{−1} mol^{−1}
Std enthalpy of formation (Δ_{f}H^{⦵}_{298})	−745.1 kJ/mol
Gibbs free energy (Δ_{f}G^{⦵})	−668.0 kJ/mol

Hazards
- GHS labelling
Pictograms	(GHS07: Exclamation mark) (GHS08: Health hazard)
Signal word	Warning
Hazard statements	H319, H335, H351
Precautionary statements	P201, P202, P261, P264, P271, P280, P281, P304+P340, P305+P351+P338, P308+P313, P312, P337+P313, P403+P233, P405, P501
NFPA 704 (fire diamond)	3 0 OX
Flash point	Non-flammable
- Lethal dose or concentration (LD, LC)
LD_{50} (median dose)	125 mg.kg (rat, oral); 2689 mg/kg (rat, oral)
LD_{Lo} (lowest published)	120 mg Mo/kg (rat, oral); 120 mg Mo/kg (guinea pig, oral)
LC_{50} (median concentration)	>5840 mg/m^{3} (rat, 4 hr)

Related compounds
Other cations	Chromium trioxide Tungsten trioxide
Related molybdenum oxides	Molybdenum dioxide "Molybdenum blue"
Related compounds	Molybdic acid Sodium molybdate
- Except where otherwise noted, data are given for materials in their standard state (at 25 °C [77 °F], 100 kPa). verify (what is ?) Infobox references

Molybdenum trioxide describes a family of inorganic compounds with the formula MoO_{3}(H_{2}O)_{n} where n = 0, 1, 2. The anhydrous compound is produced on the largest scale of any molybdenum compound since it is the main intermediate produced when molybdenum ores are purified. The anhydrous oxide is a precursor to molybdenum metal, an important alloying agent. It is also an important industrial catalyst. It is a yellow solid, although impure samples can appear blue or green.

Molybdenum trioxide occurs as the rare mineral molybdite.

== Structure ==
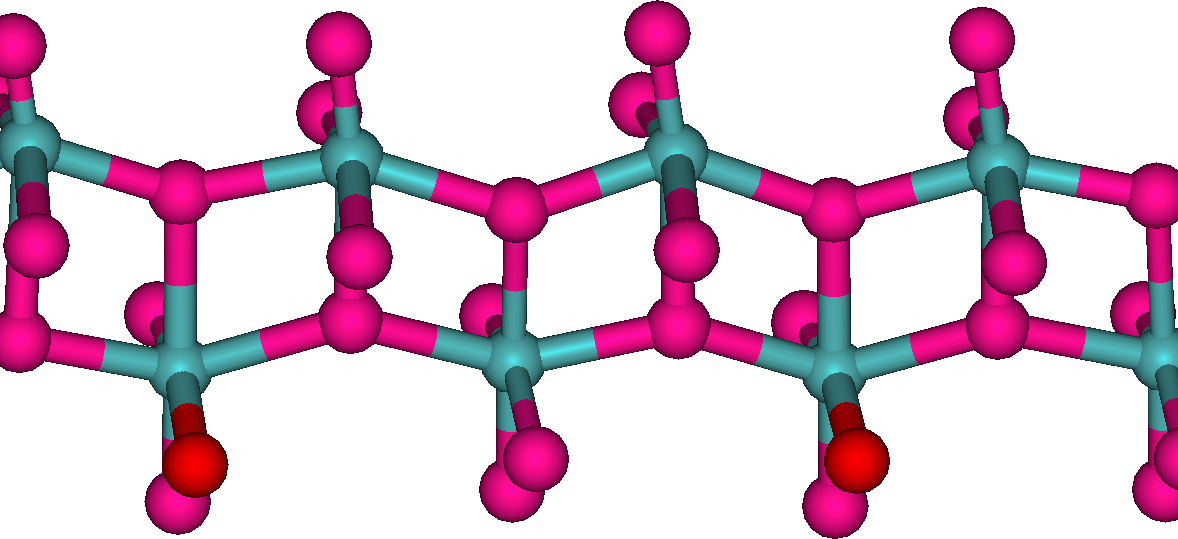
A section of the chain comprising edge-sharing octahedra. Oxygen atoms in back and front of the chain link to other chains to build the layer.

In the gas phase, three oxygen atoms are bonded to the central molybdenum atom. In the solid state, anhydrous MoO_{3} is composed of layers of distorted MoO_{6} octahedra in an orthorhombic crystal. The octahedra share edges and form chains which are cross-linked by oxygen atoms to form layers. The octahedra have one short molybdenum-oxygen bond to a non-bridging oxygen. Also known is a metastable (β) form of MoO_{3} with a WO_{3}-like structure.

== Preparation and principal reactions ==
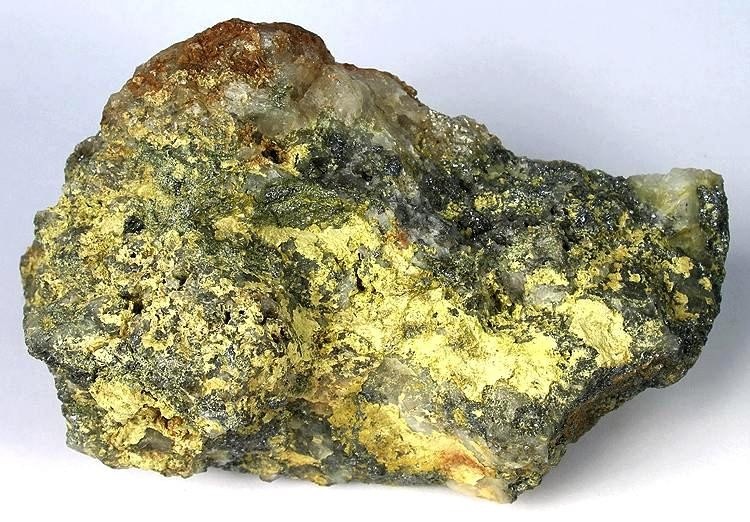
Molybdite on molybdenite, Questa molybdenum mine, New Mexico (size: 11.0×6.7×4.1 cm).

MoO_{3} is produced industrially by roasting the mineral molybdenite (molybdenum disulfide), the chief ore of molybdenum:

2 MoS_{2} + 7 O_{2} → 2 MoO_{3} + 4 SO_{2}

Similar procedures apply to the recovery of molybdenum from spent catalysts. The resulting trioxide can be purified by sublimation. The laboratory synthesis of the dihydrate entails acidification of aqueous solutions of sodium molybdate with perchloric acid:

Na_{2}MoO_{4} + H_{2}O + 2 HClO_{4} → MoO_{3}·2H_{2}O + 2 NaClO_{4}

The dihydrate loses water readily to give the monohydrate. Both are bright yellow in color. Molybdenum trioxide dissolves slightly in water to give "molybdic acid". In base, it dissolves to afford the molybdate anion.

== Uses ==
Molybdenum trioxide is used to manufacture molybdenum metal:

MoO_{3} + 3 H_{2} → Mo + 3 H_{2}O

Molybdenum trioxide is also a component of the co-catalyst used in the industrial production of acrylonitrile by the oxidation of propene and ammonia.

Because of its layered structure and the ease of the Mo(VI)/Mo(V) coupling, MoO_{3} is of interest in electrochemical devices and displays. It has been described as "the most commonly used TMO [transition metal oxide] in organic electronics applications ... it is evaporated at relatively low temperature (~400 °C)." It has favourable electronic and chemical properties for use as interfacing layers, p-type dopants and hole transport materials in OLEDs, organic solar cells and perovskite solar cells, especially when forming an ohmic contact to organic semiconductors.

== Cited sources ==
- Haynes, William M., ed. (2011). CRC Handbook of Chemistry and Physics (92nd ed.). CRC Press. ISBN 978-1-4398-5511-9.
