= Ammonium orthomolybdate =

Names
- Other names Diammonium molybdate

Identifiers
CAS Number	13106-76-8
3D model (JSmol)	Interactive image
ChEBI	CHEBI:91249
ChemSpider	17339732
ECHA InfoCard	100.032.741
EC Number	236-031-3
PubChem CID	61578
CompTox Dashboard (EPA)	DTXSID5051654
- InChI: InChI=1S/Mo.2H3N.4O/h;2*1H3;;;;/q;;;;;2*-1/p+2 Key: APUPEJJSWDHEBO-UHFFFAOYSA-P
- SMILES: [NH4+].O=[Mo]([O-])([O-])=O.[NH4+]

Properties
Chemical formula	(NH_{4})_{2}MoO_{4}
Molar mass	196.02 g/mol
Appearance	colorless monoclinic crystals
Density	2.276 g/cm^{3}
Melting point	decomposes upon heating
Solubility in water	soluble
Solubility	insoluble in alcohol and liquid ammonia

Hazards
- GHS labelling
Pictograms	(GHS07: Exclamation mark)
Signal word	Warning
Hazard statements	H302, H315, H319, H335, H412
Precautionary statements	P261, P264, P264+P265, P270, P271, P273, P280, P301+P317, P302+P352, P304+P340, P305+P351+P338, P319, P321, P330, P332+P317, P337+P317, P362+P364, P403+P233, P405, P501
- Lethal dose or concentration (LD, LC)
LD_{50} (median dose)	1870 mg/kg (rabbit, oral); 2200 mg/kg (guinea pig, oral); 1600 mg/kg (cat, oral)
LD_{Lo} (lowest published)	120 mg Mo/kg (rat, oral); 120 mg Mo/kg (guinea pig, oral)
- Except where otherwise noted, data are given for materials in their standard state (at 25 °C [77 °F], 100 kPa). Infobox references

Ammonium orthomolybdate is the inorganic compound with the chemical formula (NH_{4})_{2}MoO_{4}. It is a white solid that is prepared by treating molybdenum trioxide with aqueous ammonia. Upon heating these solutions, ammonia is lost, to give ammonium heptamolybdate ((NH_{4})_{6}Mo_{7}O_{24}·4H_{2}O).

== Uses ==
Ammonium orthomolybdate is used as a corrosion inhibitor and is an intermediate in some schemes as an intermediate to extract molybdenum from its ores. It is also used for decorating ceramics, and for colorimetric analysis of phosphates and arsenates.

== Chemical reactions ==
Heating ammonium orthomolybdate solid or treatment with acid gives molybdenum trioxide. Such reactions proceed via ammonium dimolybdate. This equilibrium is exploited in the purification of molybdenum from its ores. Aqueous solutions of ammonium orthomolybdate react with hydrogen sulfide to give ammonium tetrathiomolybdate:

(NH_{4})_{2}MoO_{4} + 4 H_{2}S → (NH_{4})_{2}MoS_{4} + 4 H_{2}O

It reacts with arsenic acid upon heating to form a canary yellow precipitate of ammonium α-Keggin molybdoarsenate.

(NH_{4})_{2}MoO_{4} + H_{3}AsO_{4} → (NH_{4})_{2}[As(Mo_{3}O_{10})_{4}] + 21 NH_{4}NO_{3} + 12 H_{2}O
