= University of Utah College of Science =

Coordinates: 40.7650°N 111.8510°W

College of Science at the University of Utah
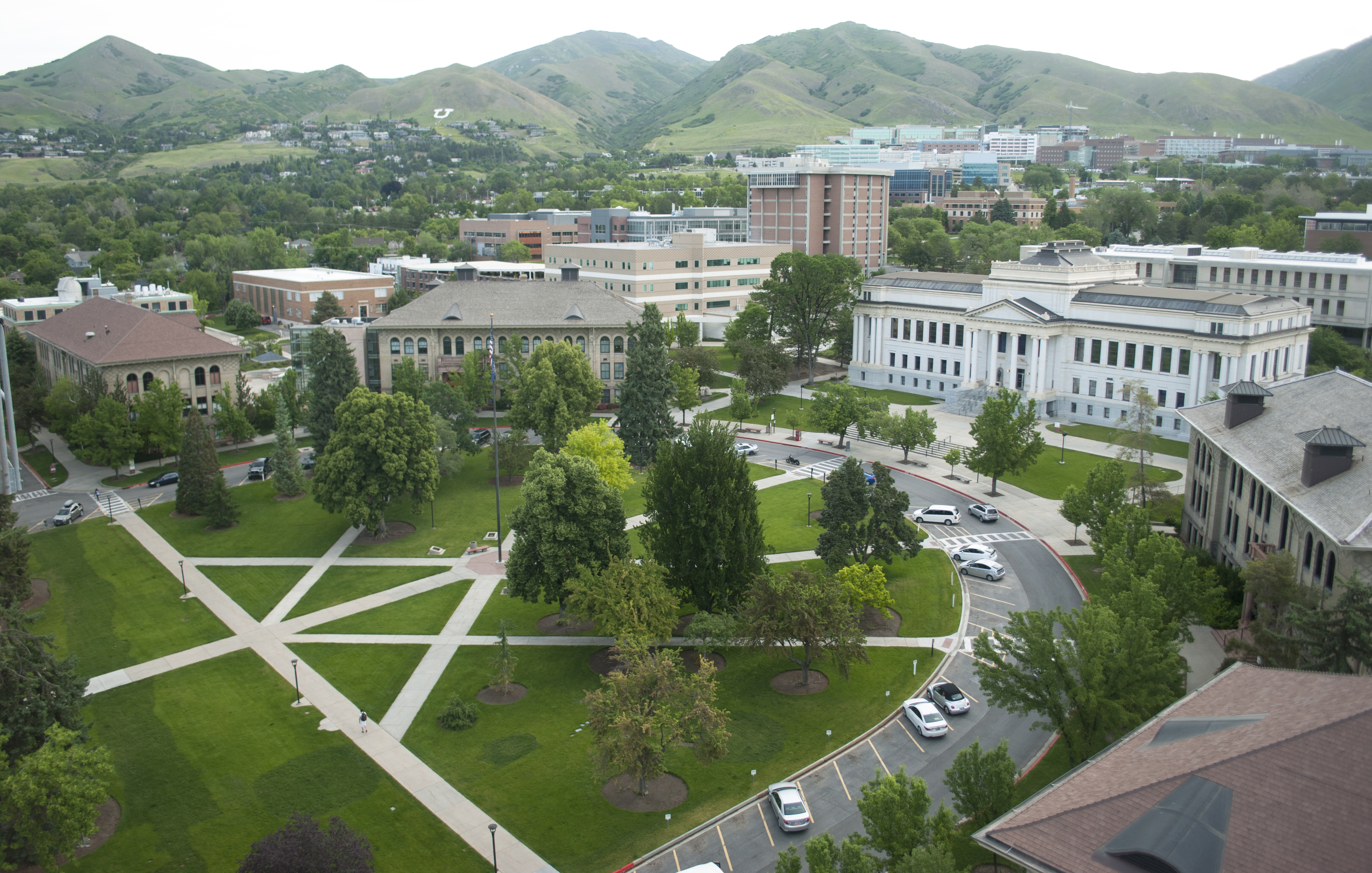
- The College of Science is located on the northwest section of the University of Utah campus, with buildings on the north and south sides of Presidents Circle.
- Type: Public
- Established: 1970
- Affiliations: University of Utah
- Dean: Peter Trapa
- Faculty: 171
- Undergraduates: 2,067
- Postgraduates: 525
- Location: Salt Lake City, Utah, United States
- Website: science.utah.edu

The College of Science at the University of Utah is an academic college of the University of Utah in Salt Lake City, Utah. The college offers undergraduate and graduate degrees in atmospheric science, biology, chemistry, geology and geophysics, mathematics, metallurgical engineering, mining engineering and physics and astronomy.

== History ==
Science has been a part for the University of Utah curriculum since the beginning of the school's history in 1850 as the University of Deseret. Dr. Cyrus Collins was initially the only professor and taught mainly in the sciences. During the second quarter, W. W. Phelps was hired as a second professor and the school was opened to women. New scientific instruments were acquired from local donors or sent for from the eastern United States. The third professor hired at the university was Orson Pratt, who taught astronomy, mathematics, and algebra. The university then closed during a period of scarcity due to crop failures and drought, and reopened in 1867. A science curriculum culminating in a BS degree was offered in 1870, becoming a 4-year degree in 1884-85. This curriculum focused on mathematics, natural, and physical sciences, as well as classes in history, political economy, theology and moral philosophy.

In 1878, Joseph T. Kingsbury joined the chemistry faculty and became chair of chemistry and physics. By this period a regular series of public science lectures were offered and there was a chemical laboratory located in the basement of the University Hall building. By the 1890s, 400 students were enrolled and the university offered BA and BS degrees in classical, scientific, and normal programs. The University of Deseret was renamed as the University of Utah in 1892 and degree programs in the traditional academic departments of letters, arts, and sciences were organized under the University College. In 1957, the University College became the College of Letters and Science under dean and philosophy professor Sterling M. McMurrin. In 1970 under Dean Milton Voight, the College of Letters and Science was divided into three separate colleges: the College of Humanities, the College of Science, and the College of Social and Behavioral Science.

In 2021, the College of Science merged with the College of Mines and Earth Sciences and includes eight academic units: the Department of Atmospheric Sciences, School of Biological Sciences, Department of Chemistry, Department of Geology and Geophysics, Department of Mathematics, Department of Metallurgical Engineering, Department of Mining Engineering and the Department of Physics and Astronomy.

== Buildings ==
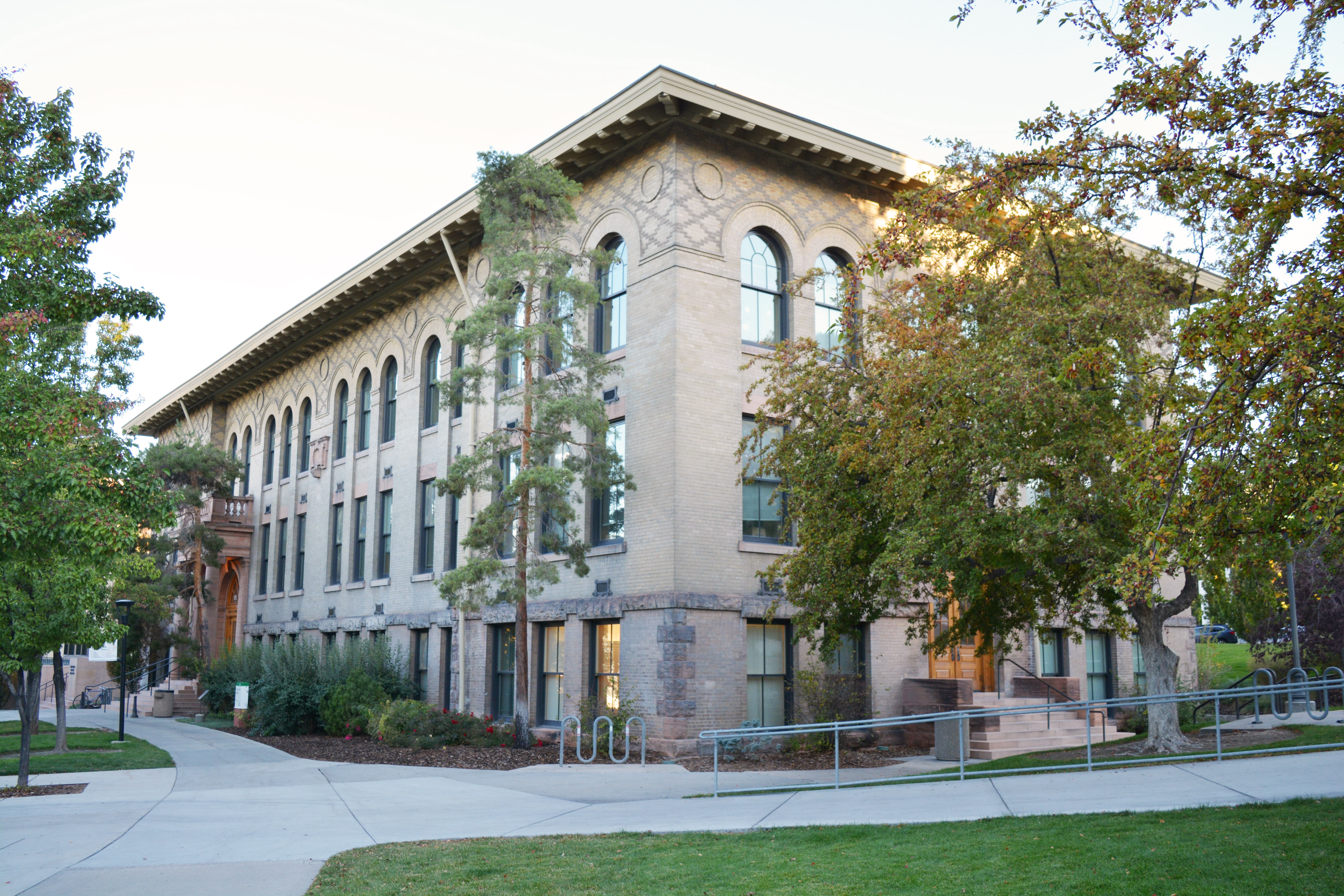
LeRoy Cowles Building

=== LeRoy Cowles Building ===
The LeRoy Cowles Building was designed by Richard Kletting and completed in 1901. As one of the first three buildings on campus it first served as the University of Utah library. Since 1951 it has housed the Department of Mathematics. It was listed in the National Register of Historic Places in 1978 and officially named for LeRoy Cowles in 1980. The building was significantly renovated in 2002 to add the T. Benny Rushing Mathematics Student Center and a plaza connecting the Cowles Building to the Widtsoe Building.

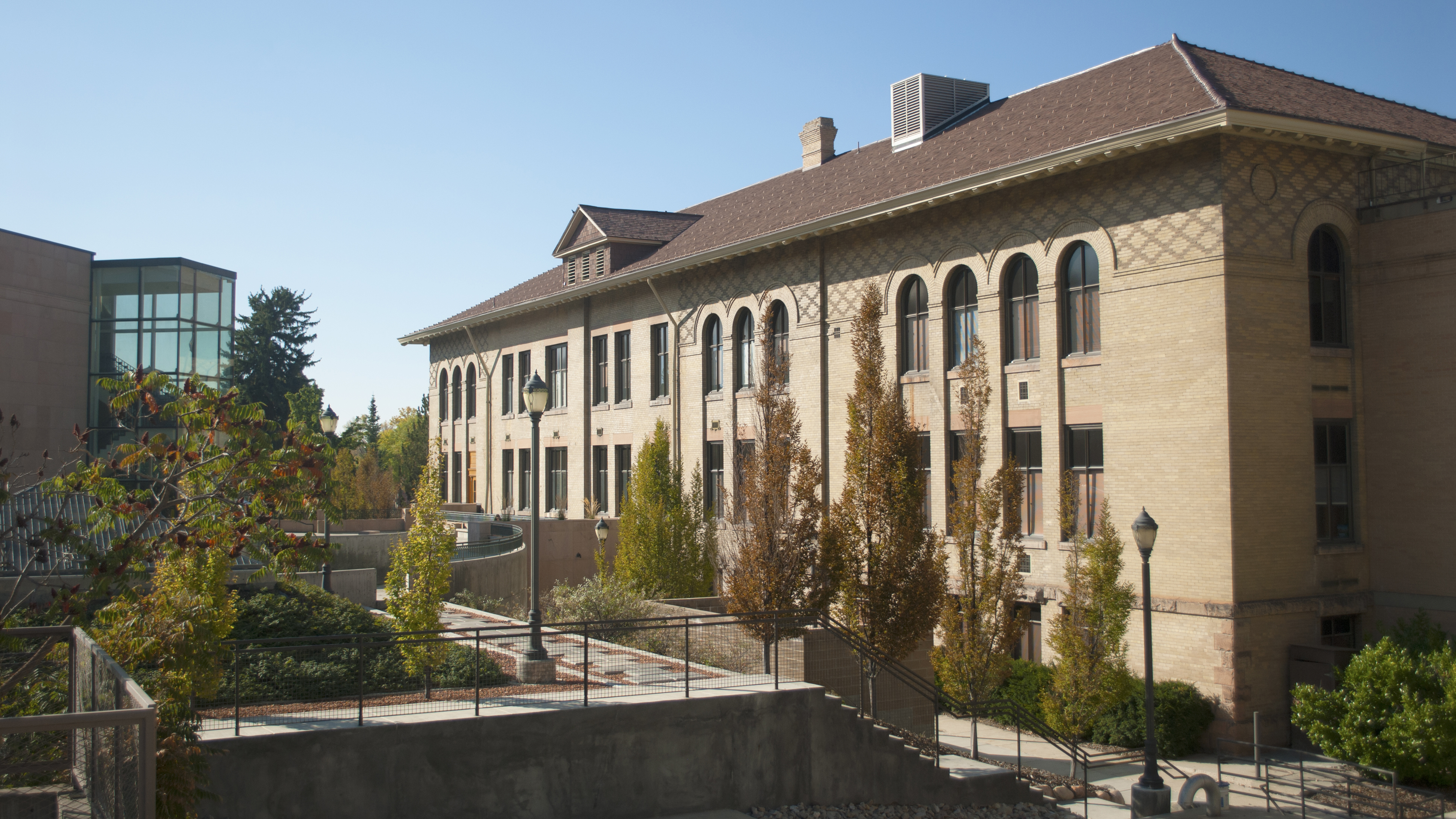
John Widtsoe Building

=== John Widtsoe Building ===
This building was designed by Richard Kletting and completed in 1901. That same year, the building was nearly destroyed by fire. Only the foundation and walls were left standing. Fortunately, these were in good condition and the building contents had been restored or replaced by the time the university opened in 1902. Uses of the building have been primarily for the sciences, with chemistry, physics and mathematics taught there through several generations. In 1976 the building was named the John A. Widtsoe Building, after the former president of the University of Utah who served from 1916 to 1921.

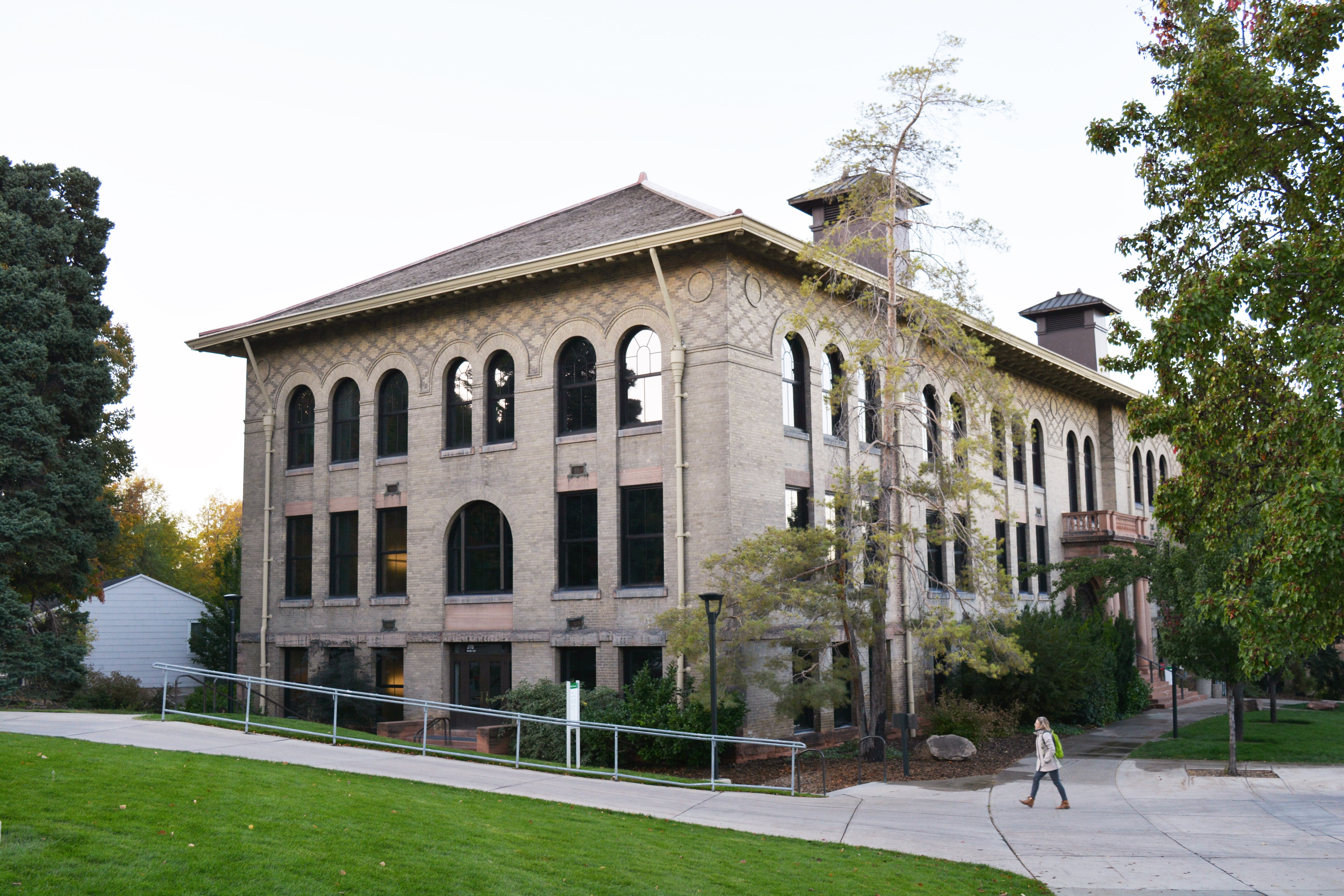
James Talmage Building

=== James Talmage Building ===
Built in 1901 and designed by Richard Kletting, this building originally served as the campus museum of natural history, and was later changed to the Biology building in 1959. In 1976 the name of the building was changed from North Biology Building to James E. Talmage building, named after former president James E. Talmage, who served from 1894–1897. It is listed in the National Register of Historic Places.

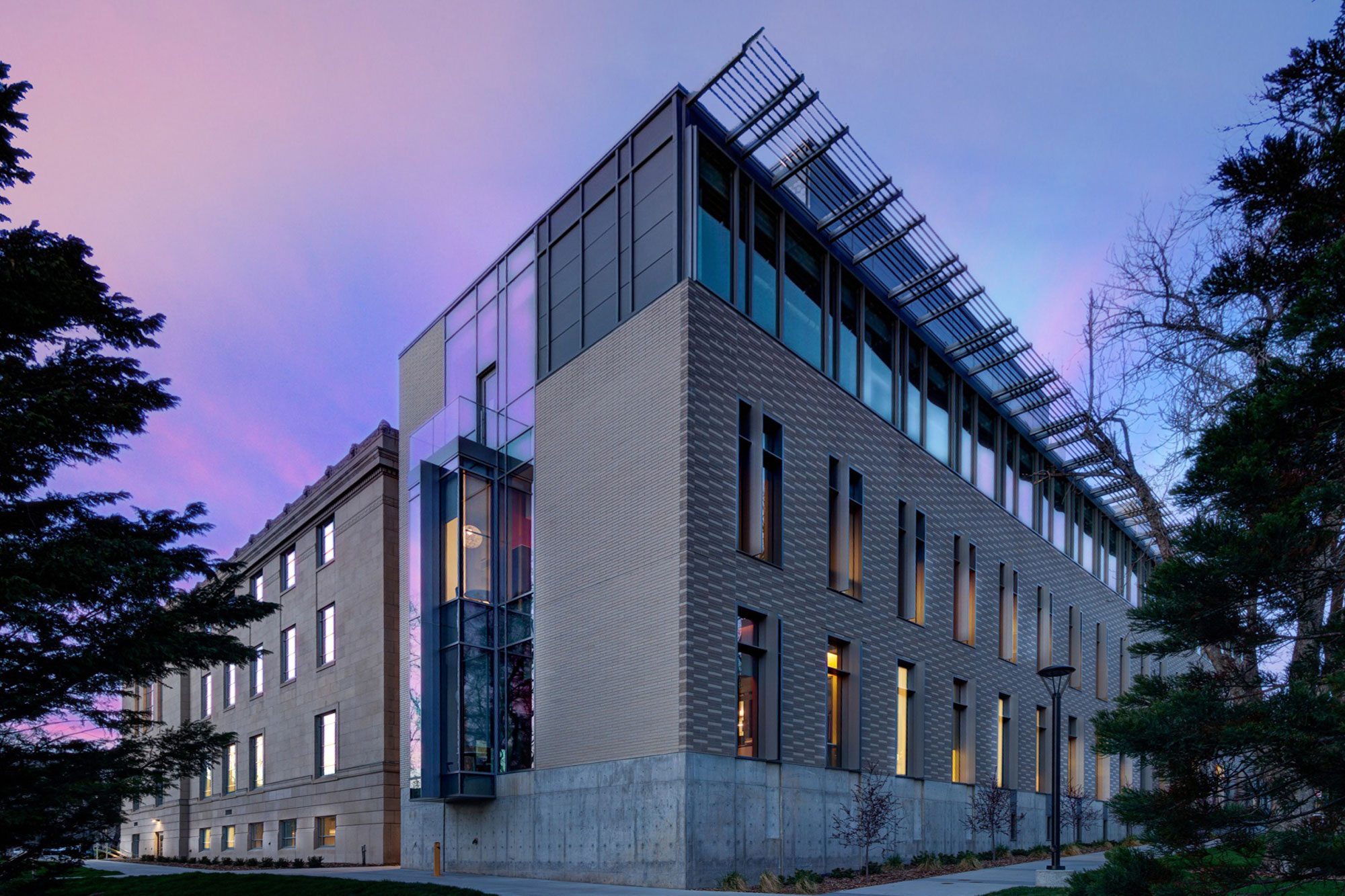
The Crocker Science Center

=== George Thomas Building / Crocker Science Center ===
Designed by Ashton and Evans, this building was completed in 1935 and named after former university president George Thomas, who served from 1921–1941. When first built it served as the University of Utah library, but later became the home of the Utah Museum of Natural History in 1968. In 2011 the Utah Museum of Natural History moved to a completely new building (in Rio Tinto, Salt Lake City) and changed its name to Natural History Museum of Utah. In 2018 the University of Utah dedicated the building as the new Gary & Ann Crocker Science Center, which consists of an interior renovation and an addition to the building. The CSC is also home to the Science Research Initiative, Henry Eyring Center for Cell and Genome Science, the U.'s Center for Science and Math Education, and the College of Science Dean's office and staff.

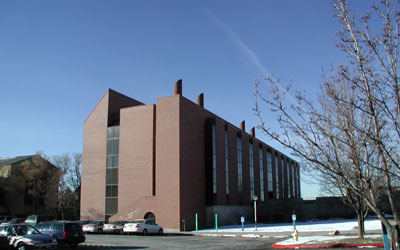
Thatcher Building

=== Henry Eyring Building ===
Completed in 2004 and designed by Pollard Architects. The Henry Eyring Building (HEB) is named after Henry Eyring, a Distinguished Professor of Chemistry and Metallurgy (1966-1981) and a former dean of the Graduate School (1946-1966). Dr. Eyring received his Ph.D. in Chemistry from the University of California, Berkeley, and taught in Wisconsin, Berlin, and Berkeley before making his way to Utah in 1946. He was a former president of the American Chemical Society (1963), and the U still has an active ACS student chapter.

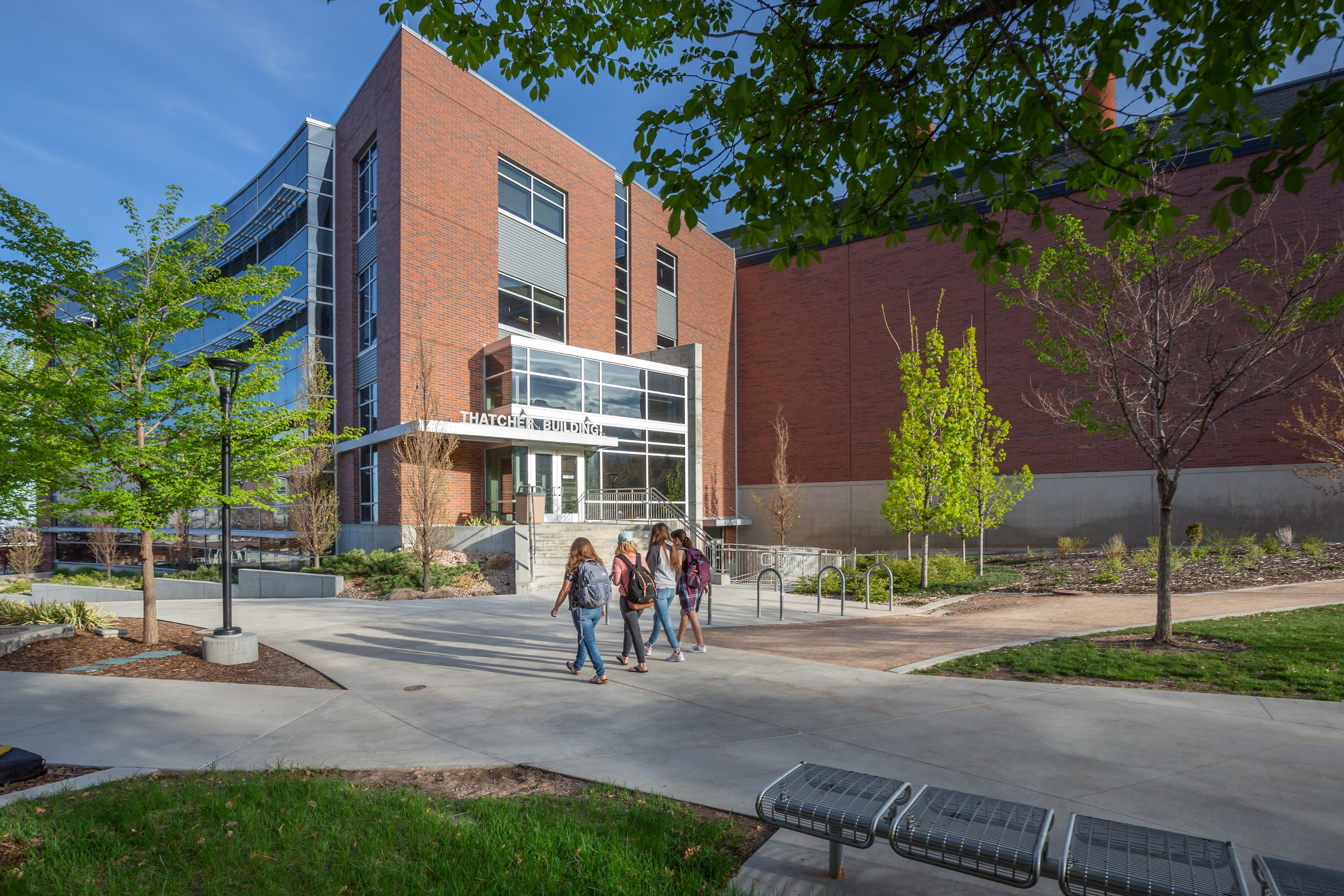
Thatcher Building

=== Thatcher Building for Biological and Biophysical Chemistry ===
Completed in 2013. The Thatcher Building for Biological and Biophysical Chemistry is named in honor of the Lawrence E. and Helen F. Thatcher family, whose generous gift made the new facility possible. Located adjacent to the Henry Eyring Chemistry Building, the five-story structure provides space for much-needed research labs for the Department of Chemistry.

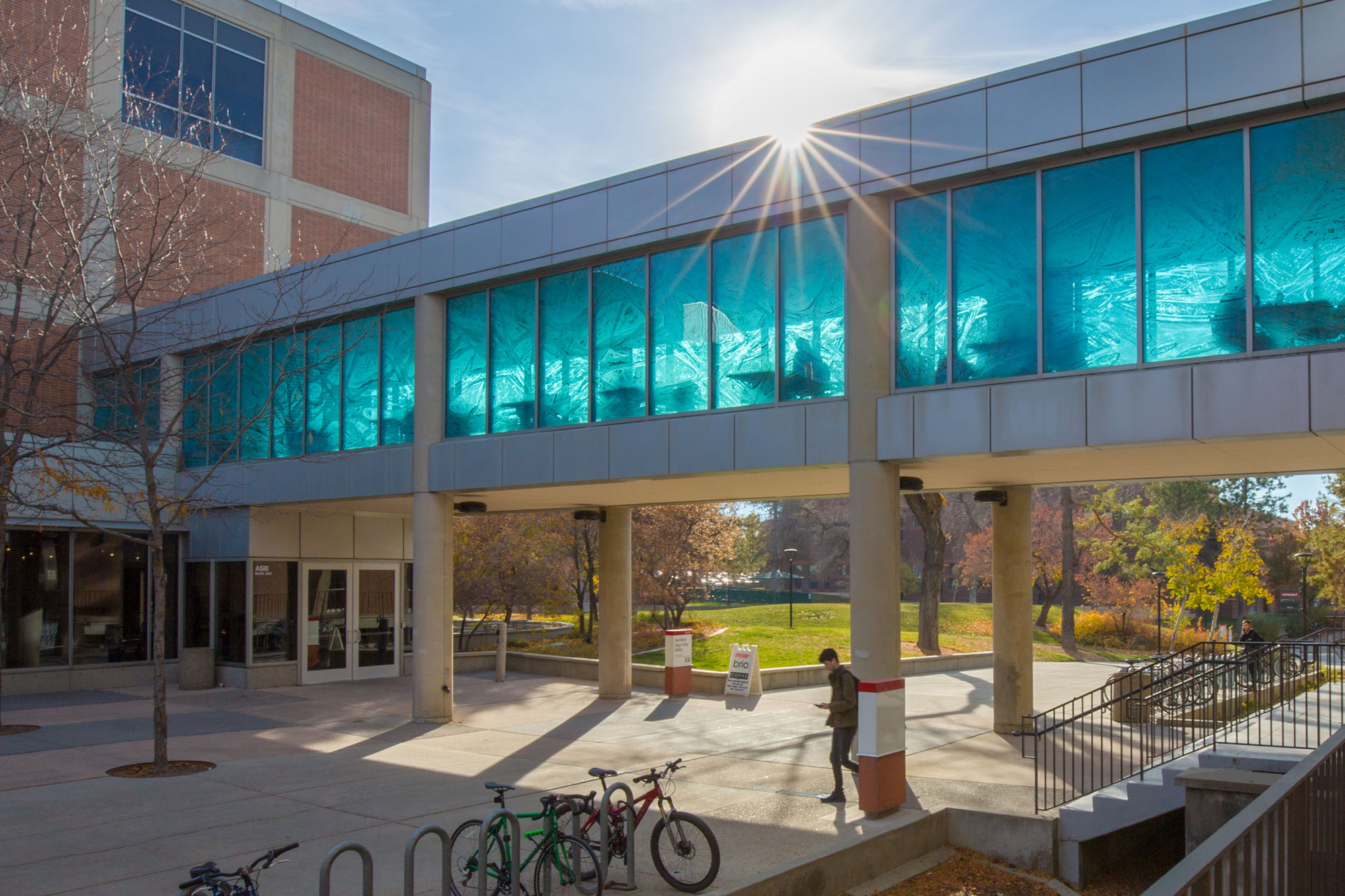
Aline W. Skaggs building

=== Aline Wilmot Skaggs Building ===
Completed in 1998 and designed by Edwards & Daniels / Anshen & Allen. The building is named for Aline Wilmot Skaggs, a philanthropist whose aim was to alleviate human suffering. Though designed primarily for research, the building includes two large lecture halls, the largest is where the Frontiers of Science, the university's longest-running lecture series, is regularly staged.

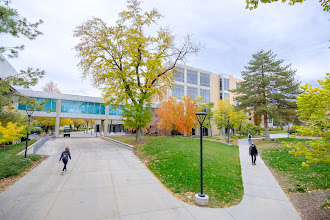
South Biology Building

=== South Biology Building ===
Completed in 1967 and designed by William F. Thomas. South Biology became the catalyst for a new emphasis in cellular and molecular microbiology research at the U, including the hiring of Mario Capecchi, the Nobel Laureate whose original lab was in the building. In 2018, the department of Biology was renamed the School of Biological Sciences, to better encapsulate the focus on the breadth of the discipline, ranging from cell biology to ecology.

=== South Physics Building ===
Completed in 1930. The South Physics Building is the home of the South Physics Observatory and AstronUmers headquarters. The South Physics Observatory normally holds weekly Star Parties with their multiple telescopes. It also contains multiple research labs, offices, a physics graduate student lounge, and a large computer lab.

=== James Fletcher Building ===
The James Fletcher Building is home to the Physics & Astronomy department. It was built on the site of an old observatory in the 1960s. It is named for James C. Fletcher, the 8th president of the University of Utah (1964-1971). After being president of the University of Utah, James Fletcher served as the 4th and 7th Administrator of NASA. He was responsible for the early planning of the Space Shuttle program, and later for its recovery and return to flight after the Space Shuttle Challenger accident.

== Departments ==
The College of Science is made up of four departments: Biology, Chemistry, Mathematics, and Physics & Astronomy. There are also a number of interdisciplinary programs administered by the college. The Center for Science and Mathematics Education offers K-12 STEM education programs, a master's degree in science for secondary school teachers, and administers the Salt Lake Valley Science and Engineering Fair which serves as the regional qualifier for the Intel International Science and Engineering Fair.

As of 2016, the College of Science consists of 171 full-time faculty members distinguished for excellence in research and education, teaching more than 300 courses per semester, and approximately 2,067 undergraduate and 525 graduate students pursuing bachelor, master and doctoral degrees in the departments of Biology, Chemistry, Mathematics, and Physics & Astronomy.

=== Biology ===
The School of Biological Sciences offers undergraduate degrees and three overlapping graduate training programs: Molecular, Cellular, and Evolutionary Biology (MCEB), Ecology Evolution and Organismal Biology (EEOB), and Microbial Biology. The department also offers minor programs in secondary school teaching certification and integrative human biology (jointly with the Department of Anthropology). Faculty research interests span a wide variety of phenomena and disciplines and the department has major research funding that supports initiatives in:

- Behavior
- Biochemistry & structural biology
- Cell biology
- Developmental biology
- Environmental biology
- Ecosystems
- Evolutionary biology
- Genetics
- Genomics
- Microbial biology
- Neurobiology
- Physiology & functional morphology
- Plant biology

=== Chemistry ===
The Department of Chemistry offers Bachelors of Arts, Bachelors of Science, and PhDs. There are nine emphases offered for undergraduates: professional (traditional chemistry major), biology, business, chemical engineering, geology, materials science and engineering, mathematics, physical chemistry, and teaching. The department has major research funding that supports initiatives in:

- Analytical Chemistry
- Biological Chemistry
- Inorganic Chemistry
- Materials Science
- Organic Chemistry
- Physical Chemistry

The department has facilities for NMR, mass spectrometry, X-ray crystallography, and optical spectroscopy. Additionally, the affiliated USTAR Synthetic and Medicinal Chemistry core provides synthetic chemistry, medicinal chemistry, and library screening services to investigators at the University of Utah and to industry partners. The department also houses the University of Utah Scientific Glassblowing shop to provide repairs, modification, and custom designs for borosilicate glass or quartz apparatus. It is also one of only eight universities worldwide to offer training and courses in scientific glassblowing for students.

Since 1980, the department has also hosted the annual free public Faraday Chemistry Christmas Lecture. University chemistry professors Ronald Ragsdale and Jerry Driscoll started the yearly tradition to recreate Michael Faraday's Christmas lecture series for children at the Royal Institution of Great Britain in 1827. The lecture series demonstrates chemistry experiments designed to inspire and entertain audiences. Tickets become available in October and are often sold out before December. After 24 years, Ragsdale and Driscoll retired in 2005 and the annual lecture has continued with a new faculty duo chosen each year.

=== Mathematics ===
The Department of Mathematics ranks 16th among public educational institutions in the United States, and has graduated two Churchill Scholarship recipients in recent years. It offers undergraduate majors with emphases in statistics, computation, applied mathematics, and teaching. The department also offers masters programs in statistics, pure mathematics, applied mathematics, and PhDs. Main faculty research areas are:

- Algebraic geometry
- Applied mathematics
- Commutative algebra
- Geometry and topology
- Mathematical biology
- Number theory
- Probability theory and statistics
- Representation theory

=== Physics & Astronomy ===
The Department of Physics & Astronomy offers bachelors, masters, and PhD programs in physics and astronomy. The department supports research in the following areas:

- Astronomy and astrophysics
- Biophysics
- Cosmic rays
- Condensed matter physics
- Medical physics
- Particle physics

The department administers the Telescope Array Project, which comprises over 507 particle detectors in Millard County, Utah, designed to observe air showers induced by ultra-high-energy cosmic rays using a combination of ground array and air-fluorescence techniques. The Project is the direct successor of the HiRes cosmic ray detector that operated in the western Utah desert by the Dugway Proving Ground from 1997 to 2006. The HiRes detector made the first observation of the Greisen–Zatsepin–Kuzmin limit, which indicates the highest energy cosmic rays that interact with the Cosmic Microwave Background and the universe becoming opaque to their propagation. The HiRes detector also recorded the "Oh-My-God particle", an ultra-high-energy cosmic ray recorded as possessing 320 exa-electron volts (EeV) of energy.

The department also possesses the only observatory on campus with telescopes. The foundation also donated funds in 2009 to install another observatory, the Willard L. Eccles Observatory in the San Francisco Mountains in southern Utah.

== Notable alumni ==
=== Biology ===
- Willis J. Gertsch (MS 1930) – arachnologist who described over 1,000 species of arachnids, including the Brown recluse spider and the Tooth cave spider
- Michael Ghiselin (BA 1960) – California Academy of Sciences biologist internationally recognized for work on sea slugs, and has had both a species (Hypselodoris ghiselini) and the defensive chemical that it contains (ghiselinin) named after him

=== Chemistry ===
- James F. Bonner (BA 1931) – plant biochemist noted for discovering an efficient process for collecting natural rubber from trees
- Wilbert L. Gore (MS 1935) – co-inventor of Gore-Tex fabrics
- Tracy Hall (BS 1942, MS 1943, PhD 1948) – invented synthetic diamonds
- Kirk Ririe (BS 2005) – co-founder of BioFire Diagnostics, a medical device and diagnostics company formally known as Idaho Technology, and member of the Utah Technology Council Hall of Fame
- Thomas Ypsilantis (BS 1949) – co-discovered the antiproton

=== Mathematics ===
- Richard Eliot Chamberlin (BS 1943) – geometric topologist, visiting scholar at the Institute for Advanced Study, and Invited Speaker at the International Congress of Mathematicians
- John E. Dennis (PhD 1966) – editor-in-chief and founder of the SIAM Journal on Optimization, pioneered convergence analysis of quasi-Newton methods
- Gordana Matic (PhD 1986) – geometric topologist, C. L. E. Moore instructor at MIT, Fellow of the American Mathematical Society
- John Warnock (BS 1961, MS 1964) – computer scientist; co-founder of Adobe Systems Inc.

=== Physics and Astronomy ===
- Edwin Catmull (BS 1969) – co-founder of Pixar Animation Studios
- John C. Cook (BS 1941) – played a crucial role in establishing the field of ground-penetrating radar
- Michael Doleac (MS 2014) – former professional basketball player in the NBA currently teaching physics at Park City High School
- David Evans (BS 1949, PhD 1953) – computer scientist and graphics pioneer and co-founder of Evans & Sutherland
- Christopher R. Johnson (PhD 1990) – founding director of the Scientific Computing and Imaging Institute, recipient of the IEEE Computer Society Sidney Fernbach Award, and recipient of the Utah Governor's Medal for Science and Technology
- Don L. Lind (BS 1953) – American scientist and a former naval officer and aviator, and NASA astronaut
- Frederic Parke (BS 1965) – made the first 3D animation of a human face
- William T. Silfvast (PhD 1965) - made significant contributions to gas discharge lasers, Distinguished Staff at Bell Labs

== Notable faculty ==
- Mladen Bestvina – major contributor to the field of geometric group theory, fellow of the American Mathematical Society, three-time medalist at the International Mathematical Olympiad, and visiting scholar at the Institute for Advanced Study
- Dale Clayton – taxonomist of Strigiphilus garylarsoni
- Stephen David Durrant – mammalogist specializing in rodents of the Great Basin
- Henry Eyring – theoretical chemist; twenty-year dean of the graduate school
- Martin Fleischmann and Stanley Pons – noted for controversial and irreproducible work on cold fusion in the 1980s and 1990s
- Kenneth M. Golden - considered the "Indiana Jones of mathematics" for his work and expeditions to study polar sea ice, Fellow of the Explorers Club, Society for Industrial and Applied Mathematics, and American Mathematical Society
- Christopher Hacon – fellow of the American Mathematical Society, received Cole Prize for work in higher dimensional birational geometry
- Roger Horn – co-developed the Bateman-Horn conjecture and co-wrote the standard-issue Matrix Analysis textbook with Charles Royal Johnson
- James Keener – pioneer in the field of mathematical physiology and cardiology and SIAM fellow
- Graeme Milton – received SIAM Ralph E. Kleinman Prize for contributions to the field of modeling composite materials, SIAM fellow, and Alfred P. Sloan Fellowship recipient
- Nalini Nadkarni – pioneered the study of Costa Rican rain forest canopies, Guggenheim Fellow
- Wiesława Nizioł – Invited Speaker at the 2006 International Congress of Mathematicians
- Baldomero Olivera – discovered and first characterized E. coli DNA ligase, a key enzyme of genetic engineering and recombinant DNA technology
- Thomas J. Parmley – physics professor and chair of the department
- Jon Seger – evolutionary ecologist noted for work on bet-hedging
- Pierre Sokolsky – led the High Resolution Fly's Eye Cosmic Ray Detector project that made the first observation of the GZK cutoff and the Oh-My-God particle, leading to the development of ultra-high-energy cosmic ray physics
- Peter Stang – editor of the Journal of the American Chemical Society; recipient of the National Medal of Science

== College deans ==
Since the official formation of the College of Science in 1970, there have been eleven deans.

| College of Science Deans | Tenure | Bio |
|---|---|---|
| Pete D. Gardner | 1971–1974 | Served as area dean in science in the College of Letters and Science from 1968-1970 and served as academic vice president under President David P. Gardner from 1973-1977. |
| Frank E. Harris | 1974–1975 | Contributed substantially to research in quantum chemistry and published nearly 250 academic papers. |
| E. Allan Davis | 1975–1976 | While at the university, he served at the National Science Foundation in Washington, DC and taught at Mildenhall Air Force Base |
| David M. Grant | 1976–1985 | Pioneer in nuclear magnetic resonance spectroscopy (NMR), received the Utah Governor's Medal for Science, and the Rosenblatt Prize for Excellence – the highest award offered to faculty at the University of Utah; in 2006 the university named the new NMR facility in honor of Grant. |
| Joseph L. Taylor | 1985–1987 | Recipient of the Leroy P. Steele Prize and Invited Speaker at the 1974 International Congress of Mathematicians |
| Hugo Rossi | 1987–1993 | Took temporary leave in 1989 to serve as director of the National Cold Fusion Institute, during which William Gray served as dean |
| T. Benny Rushing | 1993–1997 | Chair of the Department of Mathematics from 1982–1985 and again from 1991–1993, during which the department was named most improved in the nation by the Conference Board of Associated Research Councils. |
| Peter Stang | 1997–2007 | Recipient of the National Medal of Science, the highest US honor for a scientist or engineer. |
| Pierre Sokolsky | 2007–2013 | Led the High Resolution Fly's Eye Cosmic Ray Detector project that made the first observation of the GZK cutoff and the Oh-My-God particle, leading to the development of ultra-high-energy cosmic ray physics. |
| Henry S. White | 2013–2019 | Past president of the Society for Electroanalytical Chemistry, Fellow of the American Academy of Arts and Sciences, American Association for the Advancement of Science, and American Chemical Society. |
| Peter Trapa | 2019–present | Trapa is a mathematician and member of the Atlas of Lie Groups project. He was named a Fellow of the American Mathematical Society in 2019. |
