= Pierre Sokolsky =

American physicist (born 1946)

- Born: January 15, 1946 (age 80); Paris, France
- Education: University of Chicago; University of Illinois at Urbana-Champaign
- Known for: ultra-high-energy cosmic ray physics HiRes Cosmic Ray Detector; Telescope Array Project
- Awards: Sloan Fellowship (1977); Guggenheim Fellowship (2002); American Physical Society fellow (2002); Panofsky Prize (2008)
- Scientific career
- Fields: astrophysics
- Workplaces: Columbia University; University of Utah
- Thesis: Observation of Backward Meson Production in (-)pion-Proton Interactions at 8.0 Gev/c in a Streamer Chamber (1973)
- Doctoral advisor: Alexander Abashian

Pierre Vsevolod Sokolsky is an American physicist, currently a Distinguished Professor of Physics and Astronomy and Dean Emeritus of the University of Utah College of Science and also a Fellow of the American Physical Society.

== Biography ==
Pierre Sokolsky earned a BA degree in 1967 at the University of Chicago, and a MS and PhD degree in 1969 and 1973 at the University of Illinois at Urbana-Champaign. His doctoral advisor was Alexander Abashian. Following Sokolsky's doctoral degree conferral, he started a postdoctoral researcher position at Columbia University. Sokolsky joined the University of Utah physics faculty in 1981 and was promoted to full professor in 1988. He served as the chair of the physics department from August 2003 to July 2007 after which he became dean of the University of Utah College of Science until 2014.

In 2004, Sokolsky spearheaded the University’s $17 million Telescope Array Project located just west of Delta, Utah, to study ultra-high-energy cosmic rays in a collaboration with scientists from the University of New Mexico, the University of Montana, the University of Tokyo Institute for Cosmic Ray Research and several other Japanese universities. Sokolsky also launched a comprehensive astronomy research program at the University of Utah, including undergraduate and graduate degrees in astronomy.

Sokolsky was a Sloan Fellow in 1977 and 2002 he was named a Guggenheim Foundation Fellow and elected a Fellow of the American Physical Society. In 2006 Sokolsky was awarded the Utah Governor's Medal for Science and Technology for his distinguished service to the State of Utah. In 2008, he received the Panofsky Prize in Experimental Particle Physics for "the pioneering development of the atmospheric fluorescence technique as a method for exploring the highest energy cosmic rays."
