= Amaterasu particle =

Ultra-high-energy cosmic ray

The Amaterasu particle, named after the sun goddess in Japanese mythology, was an unexpected ultra-high-energy cosmic ray detected in 2021 and later identified in 2023, using the Telescope Array Project observatory in Utah, United States. It had an energy exceeding 240 exa-electronvolts (EeV) and was inferred through the two dozen particles it sent toward ground detectors. This single particle appears to have emerged, inexplicably, from the Local Void, an empty area of space bordering the Milky Way galaxy. The single subatomic particle held energy roughly equivalent to a brick dropping to the ground from waist height.

According to study leader, Associate Professor Toshihiro Fujii from Osaka Metropolitan University, "No promising astronomical object matching the direction from which the cosmic ray arrived has been identified, suggesting possibilities of unknown astronomical phenomena and novel physical origins beyond the Standard Model." A later 2026 study suggested that the particles likely originated from NGC 6946, Messier 82, or NGC 2403.

Previously reported extremely high-energy cosmic ray events include a 320 EeV particle in 1991 (Oh-My-God particle), a 213 EeV particle in 1993 and a 280 EeV particle in 2001. This makes the Amaterasu particle the third most powerful cosmic ray to have been detected.

== See also ==
- Greisen–Zatsepin–Kuzmin limit
