= Zatsepin =

Zatsepin (Russian: Зацепин) is a Russian masculine surname, its feminine counterpart is Zatsepina. Notable people with the surname include:

- Aleksandr Zatsepin (born 1926), Russian composer
- Aleksey Zatsepin (born 1984), Russian swimmer
- Eduard Zatsepin (born 1974), Russian footballer
- Georgiy Zatsepin (1917–2010), Soviet physicist
  - Greisen–Zatsepin–Kuzmin limit
