= Extragalactic cosmic ray =

Type of cosmic ray

The energy spectrum for cosmic rays.

Extragalactic cosmic rays are very-high-energy particles that flow into the Solar System from beyond the Milky Way galaxy. While at low energies, the majority of cosmic rays originate within the Galaxy (such as from supernova remnants), at high energies the cosmic ray spectrum is dominated by these extragalactic cosmic rays. The exact energy at which the transition from galactic to extragalactic cosmic rays occurs is not clear, but it is in the range 10^{17} to 10^{18} eV.

== Observation ==
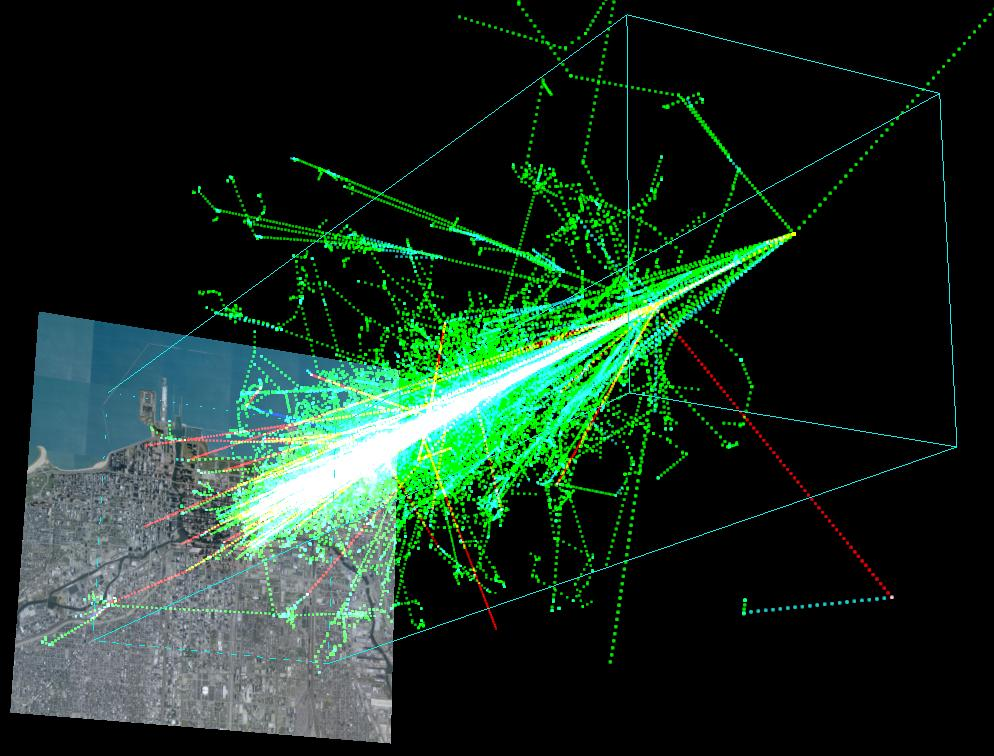
A 3D simulation of the air shower created by a 1 TeV proton hitting the atmosphere, from the COSMUS group at the University of Chicago. The ground shown is an 8 km × 8 km area.

The observation of extragalactic cosmic rays requires detectors with an extremely large surface area, due to the very limited flux. As a result, extragalactic cosmic rays are generally detected with ground-based observatories, by means of the extensive air showers they create. These ground based observatories can be either surface detectors, which observe the air shower particles which reach the ground, or air fluorescence detectors (also called 'fly's eye' detectors), which observe the fluorescence caused by the interaction of the charged air shower particles with the atmosphere. In either case, the ultimate aim is to find the mass and energy of the primary cosmic ray which created the shower. Surface detectors accomplish this by measuring the density of particles at the ground, while fluorescence detectors do so by measuring the depth of shower maximum (the depth from the top of the atmosphere at which the maximum number of particles are present in the shower). The two currently operating high energy cosmic ray observatories, the Pierre Auger Observatory and the Telescope Array, are hybrid detectors which use both of these methods. This hybrid methodology allows for a full three-dimensional reconstruction of the air shower, and gives much better directional information as well as more accurate determination of the type and energy of the primary cosmic ray than either technique on its own.

=== Pierre Auger Observatory ===
The Pierre Auger Observatory, located in the Mendoza province in Argentina, consists of 1660 surface detectors, each separated by 1.5 km and covering a total area of 3000 km^{2}, and 27 fluorescence detectors at 4 different locations overlooking the surface detectors. The observatory has been in operation since 2004, and began operating at full capacity in 2008 once construction was completed. The surface detectors are water Cherenkov detectors, each detector being a tank 3.6 m in diameter. One of the Pierre Auger Observatory's most notable results is the detection of a dipole anisotropy in the arrival directions of cosmic rays with energy greater than 8 × 10^{18} eV, which was the first conclusive indication of their extragalactic origin.

=== Telescope Array ===
The Telescope Array is located in the state of Utah in the United States of America, and consists of 507 surface detectors separated by 1.2 km and covering a total area of 700 km^{2}, and 3 fluorescence detector stations with 12-14 fluorescence detectors at each station. The Telescope Array was constructed by a collaboration between the teams formerly operating the Akeno Giant Air Shower Array (AGASA), which was a surface detector array in Japan, and the High Resolution Fly's Eye (HiRes), which was an air fluorescence detector also located in Utah. The Telescope Array was initially designed to detect cosmic rays with energy above 10^{19} eV, but an extension to the project, the Telescope Array Low Energy extension (TALE) is currently underway and will allow observation of cosmic rays with energies above 3 × 10^{16} eV

== Spectrum and Composition ==
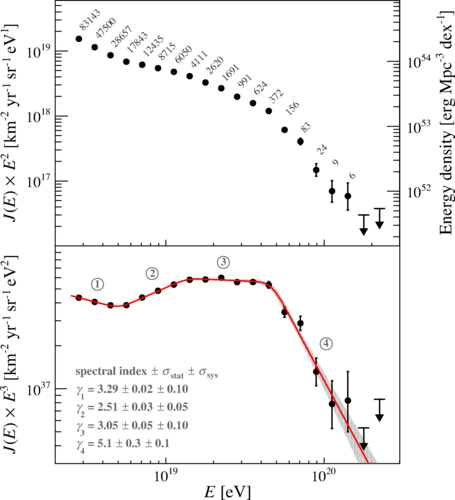
Energy spectrum of cosmic rays with energy greater than 2.5 × 10^{18} eV from data observed by the Pierre Auger Observatory

Two clear and long-known features of the spectrum of extragalactic cosmic rays are the 'ankle', which is a flattening of the spectrum at around 5 × 10^{18} eV, and suppression of the cosmic ray flux at high energies (above about 4 × 10^{19} eV). More recently the Pierre Auger Observatory also observed a steepening of the cosmic ray spectrum above the ankle, before the steep cutoff above than 10^{19} eV (see figure). The spectrum measured by the Pierre Auger Observatory does not appear to depend on the arrival direction of the cosmic rays. However, there are some discrepancies between the spectrum (specifically the energy at which the suppression of flux occurs) measured by the Pierre Auger Observatory in the Southern hemisphere and the Telescope Array in the Northern hemisphere. It is unclear whether this is the result of an unknown systematic error or a true difference between the cosmic rays arriving at the Northern and Southern hemispheres.

The interpretation of these features of the cosmic ray spectrum depends on the details of the model assumed. Historically the ankle is interpreted as the energy at which the steep Galactic cosmic ray spectrum transitions to a flat extragalactic spectrum. However diffusive shock acceleration in supernova remnants, which is the predominant source of cosmic rays below 10^{15} eV, can accelerate protons only up to 3 × 10^{15} eV and iron up to 8 × 10^{16} eV. Thus there must be an additional source of Galactic cosmic rays up to around 10^{18} eV. On the other hand, the 'dip' model assumes that the transition between Galactic and extragalactic cosmic rays occurs at about 10^{17} eV. This model assumes that extragalactic cosmic rays are composed purely of protons, and the ankle is interpreted as being due to pair production arising from interactions of cosmic rays with the Cosmic Microwave Background (CMB). This suppresses the cosmic ray flux and thus causes a flattening of the spectrum. Older data, as well as more recent data from the Telescope Array do favour a pure proton composition. However recent Auger data suggests a composition which is dominated by light elements to 2 × 10^{18} eV, but becomes increasingly dominated by heavier elements with increasing energy. In this case a source of the protons below 2 × 10^{18} eV is needed.

The suppression of flux at high energies is generally assumed to be due to the Greisen–Zatsepin–Kuz'min (GZK) effect in the case of protons, or due to photodisintegration by the CMB (the Gerasimova-Rozental or GR effect) in the case of heavy nuclei. However it could also be because of the nature of the sources, that is because of the maximum energy to which sources can accelerate cosmic rays.

As mentioned above the Telescope Array and the Pierre Auger Observatory give different results for the most likely composition. However the data used to infer composition from these two observatories is consistent once all systematic effects are taken into account. The composition of extragalactic cosmic rays is thus still ambiguous

== Origin ==
Unlike solar or galactic cosmic rays, little is known about the origins of extragalactic cosmic rays. This is largely due to a lack of statistics: only about 1 extragalactic cosmic ray particle per square kilometer per year reaches the Earth's surface (see figure). The possible sources of these cosmic rays must satisfy the Hillas criterion,

$E = qBR$

where E is the energy of the particle, q its electric charge, B is the magnetic field in the source and R the size of the source. This criterion comes from the fact that for a particle to be accelerated to a given energy, its Larmor radius must be less than the size of the accelerating region. Once the Larmor radius of the particle is greater than the size of the accelerating region, it escapes and does not gain any more energy. As a consequence of this, heavier nuclei (with a greater number of protons), if present, can be accelerated to higher energies than protons within the same source.

=== Active galactic nuclei ===
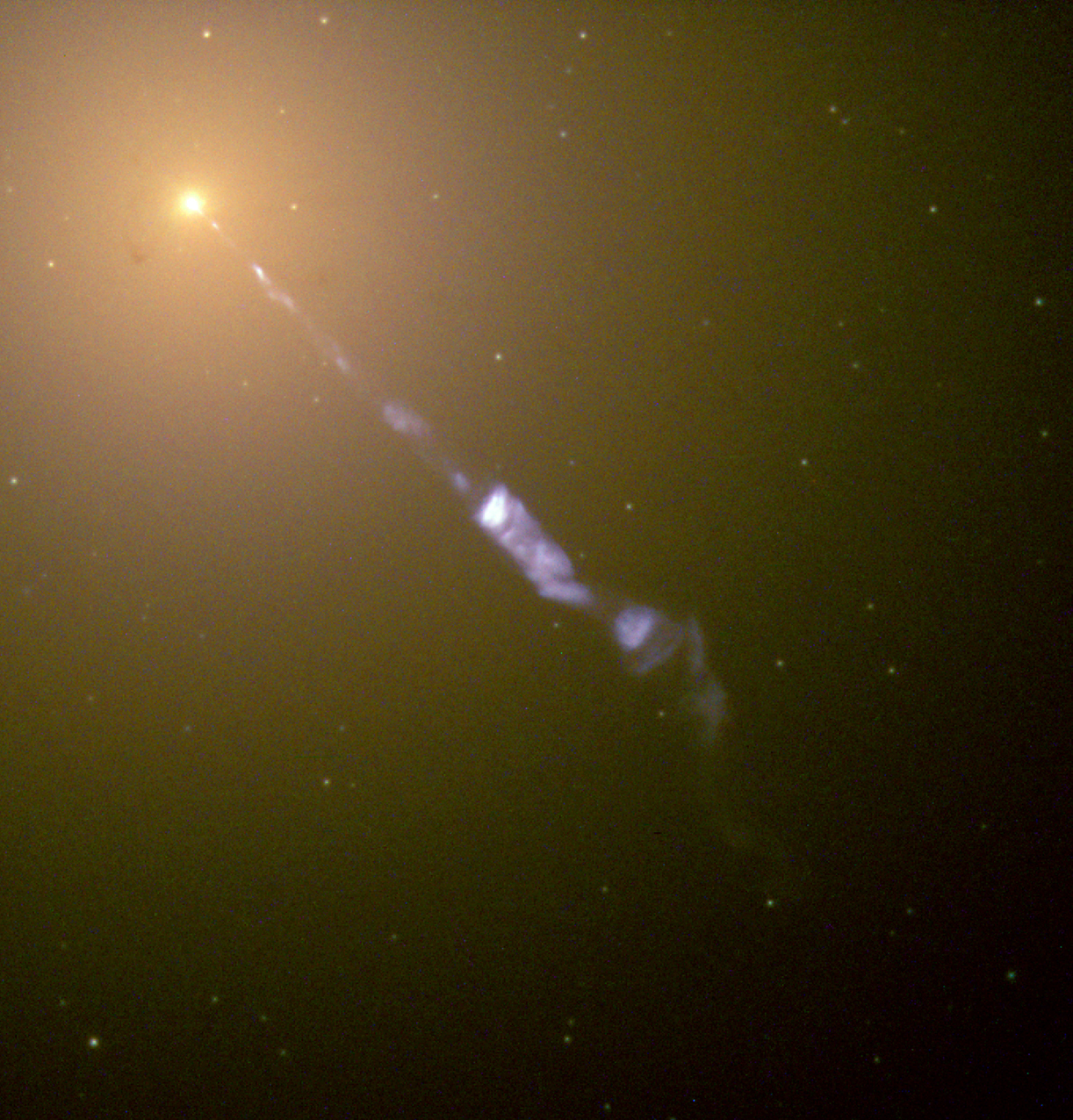
Image of an active galactic nucleus of the active galaxy M87.

Active galactic nuclei (AGNs) are well known to be some of the most energetic objects in the universe, and are therefore often considered as candidates for the production of extragalactic cosmic rays. Given their extremely high luminosity, AGNs can accelerate cosmic rays to the required energies even if only 1/1000 of their energy is used for this acceleration. There is some observational support for this hypothesis. Analysis of cosmic ray measurements with the Pierre Auger Observatory suggests a correlation between the arrival directions of cosmic rays of the highest energies of more than 5×10^{19} eV and the positions of nearby active galaxies. In 2017, IceCube detected a high energy neutrino with energy 290 TeV whose direction was consistent with a flaring blazar, TXS 0506-056, which strengthened the case for AGNs as a source of extragalactic cosmic rays. Since high-energy neutrinos are assumed to come from the decay of pions produced by the interaction of correspondingly high-energy protons with the Cosmic Microwave Background (CMB) (photo-pion production), or from the photodisintegration of energetic nuclei, and since neutrinos travel essentially unimpeded through the universe, they can be traced back to the source of high-energy cosmic rays.

=== Clusters of galaxies ===
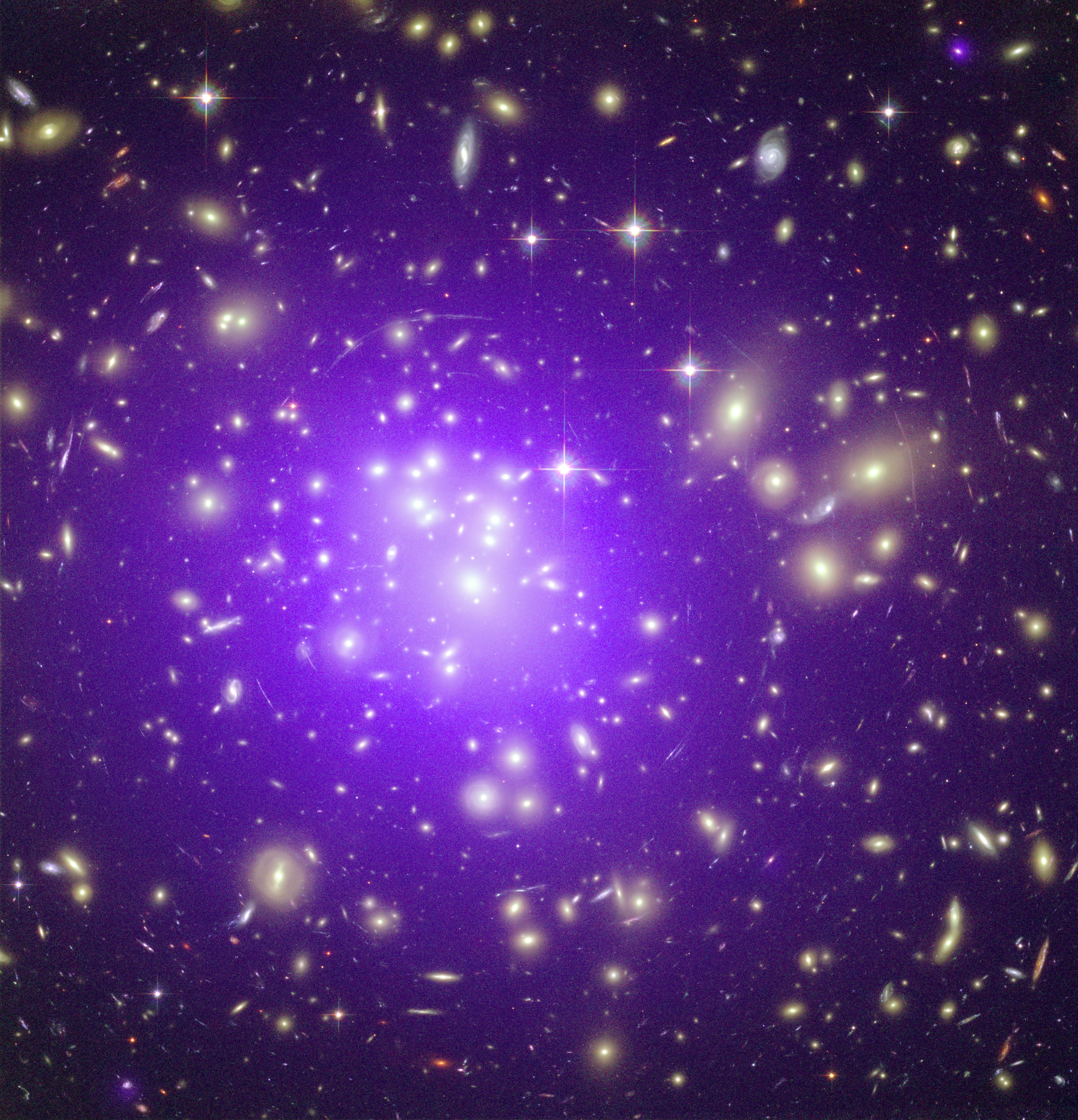
A multiwavelength image of the galaxy cluster Abell 1689, with X-ray (purple) and optical (yellow) data. The diffuse X-ray emission arises from the hot intracluster medium

Galaxy clusters continuously accrete gas and galaxies from filaments of the cosmic web. As the cold gas which is accreted falls into the hot intracluster medium, it gives rise to shocks at the outskirts of the cluster, which could accelerate cosmic rays through the diffusive shock acceleration mechanism. Large scale radio halos and radio relics, which are expected to be due to synchrotron emission from relativistic electrons, show that clusters do host high energy particles. Studies have found that shocks in clusters can accelerate iron nuclei to 10^{20} eV, which is nearly as much as the most energetic cosmic rays observed by the Pierre Auger Observatory. However, if clusters do accelerate protons or nuclei to such high energies, they should also produce gamma ray emission due to the interaction of the high-energy particles with the intracluster medium. This gamma ray emission has not yet been observed, which is difficult to explain.

=== Gamma ray bursts ===
Gamma ray bursts (GRBs) were originally proposed as a possible source of extragalactic cosmic rays because the energy required to produce the observed flux of cosmic rays was similar their typical luminosity in γ-rays, and because they could accelerate protons to energies of 10^{20} eV through diffusive shock acceleration. Long gamma ray bursts (GRBs) are especially interesting as possible sources of extragalactic cosmic rays in light of the evidence for a heavier composition at higher energies. Long GRBs are associated with the death of massive stars, which are well known to produce heavy elements. However, in this case many of the heavy nuclei would be photo-disintegrated, leading to considerable neutrino emission also associated with GRBs, which has not been observed. Some studies have suggested that a specific population of GRBs known as low-luminosity GRBs might resolve this, as the lower luminosity would lead to less photo-dissociation and neutrino production. These low luminosity GRBs could also simultaneously account for the observed high-energy neutrinos. However it has also been argued that these low-luminosity GRBs are not energetic enough to be a major source of high energy cosmic rays.

=== Neutron stars ===
Neutron stars are formed from the core collapse of massive stars, and as with GRBs can be a source of heavy nuclei. In models with neutron stars - specifically young pulsars or magnetars - as the source of extragalactic cosmic rays, heavy elements (mainly iron) are stripped from the surface of the object by the electric field created by the magnetized neutron star's rapid rotation. This same electric field can accelerate iron nucleii up to 10^{20} eV. The photodisintegration of the heavy nucleii would produce lighter elements with lower energies, matching the observations of the Pierre Auger Observatory. In this scenario, the cosmic rays accelerated by neutron stars within the Milky Way could fill in the 'transition region' between Galactic cosmic rays produced in supernova remnants, and extragalactic cosmic rays.

== See also ==
- Ultra-high-energy cosmic ray
