= Akeno Observatory =

Cosmic ray observatory located in Akeno, Japan

Coordinates: 35°47′N 138°30′E

Akeno Observatory is a cosmic ray observatory located in Akeno, a town in Yamanashi prefecture, Japan. The observatory is run by the Institute for Cosmic Ray Research (ICRR), based at the University of Tokyo. Akeno Observatory features AGASA, the Akeno Giant Air Shower Array, which studies the origins of very high energy cosmic rays.

Construction of the observatory began in 1975, and in 1977 it became the second attached institution with ICRR. Its accomplishments include the observation of a super high energy cosmic ray air shower in 1995 that was previously thought to be impossible.

== See also ==
- List of astronomical observatories
- List of largest cosmic structures
