= John Linsley =

American physicist

John D. Linsley
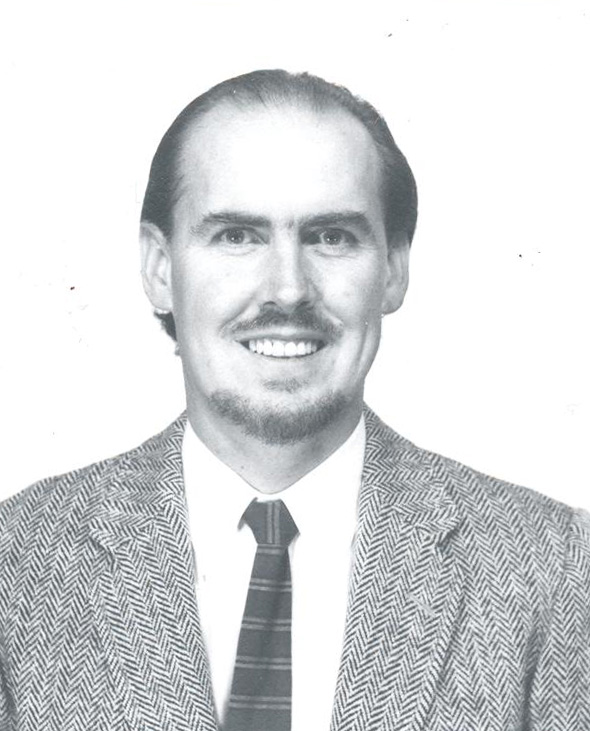
- John Linsley's 1963 passport photograph
- Born: John David Linsley; 12 March 1925; Minneapolis, Minnesota, US
- Died: 15 September 2002 (aged 77); Albuquerque, New Mexico, US
- Education: University of Minnesota
- Known for: Seminal contributions to study of cosmic rays
- Awards: Nominated for the Nobel Prize in Physics (1980)
- Scientific career
- Fields: Physics
- Workplaces: University of Minnesota; Massachusetts Institute of Technology; University of New Mexico; University of Palermo
- Doctoral advisor: Edward P. Ney

John David Linsley (12 March 1925 – 15 September 2002) was an American physicist who performed pioneering research on cosmic rays, particularly ultra-high-energy cosmic rays. He did his most significant work from 1959 to 1978 using a ground-based array of detectors at Volcano Ranch in New Mexico. He is best known for being the first to detect an air shower created by a primary particle with an energy of 10^{20} eV. This was the highest energy cosmic ray observed up to that point. Linsley's observations suggested that not all cosmic rays are confined within the galaxy and showed the first evidence of a flattening of the cosmic ray spectrum at energies above 10^{18} eV.

== Early life and career ==
John David Linsley was born on March 12, 1925, in Minneapolis, Minnesota. His father, James Adolphus Linsley, was born in Morris, Minnesota, and worked for the Minneapolis Transit Company as a streetcar conductor. His mother, Martha Carolina Linsley, was born in Follinge, Sweden, and was a graduate of the University of Minnesota. He had one sister, Ruth Anne Linsley Forman.

Linsley was homeschooled by his mother for much of his childhood and graduated from Roosevelt High School in Minneapolis in 1941. He attended the University of Minnesota, graduating in 1946. While working on his bachelor's degree, Linsley also served in the U.S. Army from 1944 to 1946.

After completing his undergraduate education, Linsley remained at the University of Minnesota to work on his Ph.D. under the direction of Edward P. Ney. He completed his Ph.D. in 1952, after which he worked as a research fellow at the University of Minnesota from 1952 to 1954. In 1954, Linsley took a job as a research associate at the Massachusetts Institute of Technology (MIT). He held this position from 1954 to 1955 and from 1958 to 1972. While at MIT, Linsley was a member of a team led by Bruno Rossi. This team used an air shower array at Harvard University's Agassiz Astronomical Station to observe air showers created by cosmic rays using ground-based liquid scintillator detectors. The analysis techniques Rossi's group developed laid the groundwork for the analysis of data from future arrays.

== Volcano Ranch ==
In 1957, Rossi asked Linsley to design a much larger array based on the principles of the Agassiz array. Linsley worked with Livio Scarsi from the University of Milan to build an array of nineteen plastic scintillation detectors at Volcano Ranch near Albuquerque, New Mexico. They began making observations in the summer of 1959. On February 22, 1962, Linsley observed an air shower created by a primary particle with an energy greater than 10^{20} eV, the highest energy cosmic ray particle ever detected at the time. Linsley's observations at Volcano Ranch expanded the known cosmic ray energy spectrum, clarified the structure of air showers, and provided the first evidence on ultra-high-energy cosmic ray composition and arrival directions. Linsley’s observations also indicated that not all cosmic rays are confined within the galaxy and provided the first evidence of a flattening of the cosmic ray spectrum at energies above 10^{18} eV.

Volcano Ranch was transferred from MIT to the University of New Mexico in 1972 and Linsley took a position as adjunct professor of physics at the University of New Mexico. In 1973, Linsley created a denser array at Volcano Ranch to study the lateral distribution of air showers. His work led him to develop the elongation rate theorem, which describes the rate of the change of the atmospheric depth of the air shower maximum with the energy of the primary particle. In 1976, Linsley became a Research Professor of Physics and Astronomy at the University of New Mexico. Volcano Ranch was closed in 1978, when funding for the project ran out.

== Later career ==
After the closing of Volcano Ranch, Linsley continued his work in the field of cosmic rays. In 1979, he proposed detecting the fluorescence created by cosmic rays in the atmosphere through the use of a space-based observatory, a project which he called SOCRAS (Satellite Observation of Cosmic Ray Air Showers). This was the first proposal of a space-based cosmic ray observatory. He served as principal investigator on two research projects and collaborated on several others.

Linsley was nominated for the Nobel Prize in Physics by Pierre Auger in 1980 for his work with cosmic rays. He won the Premio Internazionale San Valentino d’Oro in astrophysics in 1982. In 1986, he became a visiting professor at the University of Palermo and a senior fellow at the Istituto di Fisica Cosmica in Palermo, Italy. In the mid-1990s, Linsley's idea of a space-based observatory was revived by the establishment of the international AirWatch consortium. Linsley was actively involved in this project, which evolved into AirWatch-OWL, and in the Extreme Universe Space Observatory, another project to create a space-based observatory for the investigation of cosmic rays.

John Linsley died on September 15, 2002, in Albuquerque, New Mexico. He is survived by his son, Alessandro and his daughters, Mrs Joanna Linsley-Poe and Amina.
