= Joseph L. Taylor =

American mathematician

Joseph Lawrence Taylor (7 April 1941 - 28 July 2016) was an American mathematician, specializing in Banach algebras and non-commutative harmonic analysis.

== Education and career ==
Taylor received from Louisiana State University in 1963 his bachelor's degree and in 1964 his Ph.D. under Pasquale Porcelli with thesis The structure of convolution measure algebras. From 1964 to 1965 he was a Benjamin Peirce Instructor at Harvard University. He became in 1965 an assistant professor and in 1971 a full professor at the University of Utah. In 1974 he was an invited speaker at the International Congress of Mathematicians in Vancouver, British Columbia, Canada. In 1975 he received for his article Measure algebras the Leroy P. Steele Prize. At the University of Utah, Taylor was from 1979 to 1982 the chair of the mathematics department, from 1985 to 1987 the dean of the College of Science, and from 1987 to 1990 the vice-president of Academic Affairs.

== Selected publications ==
- Taylor, Joseph L. (1965). "The structure of convolution measure algebras". Trans. Amer. Math. Soc. 119 (1): 150–166. doi:10.2307/1994236. ISSN 0002-9947. JSTOR 1994236.
- Measure algebras. Conference Board of the Mathematical Sciences, Regional conference series in mathematics, vol. 16. Providence, Rhode Island: American Mathematical Society. 1973. ISBN 0-8218-1666-7.; reprint, 1979.
- Several complex variables with connections to algebraic geometry and Lie groups. Graduate studies in mathematics, vol. 46. Providence, Rhode Island: American Mathematical Society. 2002. ISBN 0-8218-3178-X.
- Complex variables. Pure and applied undergraduate texts, vol.16. Providence, Rhode Island: American Mathematical Society. 2011. ISBN 978-0-8218-6901-7.
- Foundations of Analysis. Pure and applied undergraduate texts, vol. 18. Providence, Rhode Island: American Mathematical Society. 2012. ISBN 978-0-8218-8984-8.
