= Centrifugal acceleration (astrophysics) =

Cosmic ray acceleration mechanism

Centrifugal acceleration of astroparticles to relativistic energies might take place in rotating astrophysical objects (see also Fermi acceleration). It is strongly believed that active galactic nuclei and pulsars have rotating magnetospheres, therefore, they potentially can drive charged particles to high and ultra-high energies. It is a proposed explanation for ultra-high-energy cosmic rays (UHECRs) and extreme-energy cosmic rays (EECRs) exceeding the Greisen–Zatsepin–Kuzmin limit.

== Acceleration to high energies ==
It is well known that the magnetospheres of AGNs and pulsars are characterized by strong magnetic fields that force charged particles to follow the field lines. If the magnetic field is rotating (which is the case for such astrophysical objects), the particles will inevitably undergo centrifugal acceleration. The pioneering work by Machabeli & Rogava was a thought experiment in which a bead moves inside a straight rotating pipe. Dynamics of the particle were analyzed both analytically and numerically and it was shown that if the rigid rotation is maintained for a sufficiently long time energy of the bead will asymptotically increase. In particular, Rieger & Mannheim, building on the theory of Machabeli & Rogava, showed that the Lorentz factor of the bead behaves as

$$\gamma = \frac{\gamma_0}{1 - \Omega^2r^2/c^2}$$	1

where $\gamma_0$ is the initial Lorentz factor, Ω is the angular velocity of rotation, $r$ is the radial coordinate of the particle, and $c$ is the speed of light. From this behavior it is evident that radial motion will exhibit a nontrivial character. In due course of motion the particle will reach the light cylinder surface (a hypothetical area where the linear velocity of rotation exactly equals the speed of light), leading to the increase of the poloidal component of velocity. On the other hand, the total velocity cannot exceed the speed of light, therefore, the radial component must decrease. This means that the centrifugal force changes its sign.

As is seen from (1), the Lorentz factor of the particle tends to infinity if the rigid rotation is maintained. This means that in reality the energy has to be limited by certain processes. Generally speaking, there are two major mechanisms: The inverse Compton scattering (ICS) and the so-called breakdown of the bead on the wire (BBW) mechanism. For jet-like structures in an AGN it has been shown that, for a wide range of inclination angles of field lines with respect to the rotation axis, ICS is the dominant mechanism efficiently limiting the maximum attainable Lorentz factors of electrons $\gamma_\text{ICS}^\text{max} \sim 10^8$. On the other hand, it was shown that the BBW becomes dominant for relatively low luminosity AGN $L < 8\times {10}^{40} \mathrm{{erg}/s}$, leading to $\gamma_\text{BBW}^\text{max}\sim 10^7$.

The centrifugal effects are more efficient in millisecond pulsars as the rotation rate is quite high. Osmanov & Rieger considered the centrifugal acceleration of charged particles in the light cylinder area of the Crab-like pulsars. It has been shown that electrons might achieve the Lorentz factors $\gamma_\text{KN}^\text{max} \sim 10^7$ via inverse Compton Klein–Nishina up-scattering.

== Acceleration to very high and ultra-high energies ==
Although the direct centrifugal acceleration has limitations, as analysis shows the effects of rotation still might play an important role in the processes of acceleration of charged particles. Generally speaking, it is believed that the centrifugal relativistic effects may induce plasma waves, which under certain conditions might be unstable efficiently pumping energy from the background flow. On the second stage energy of wave-modes can be transformed into energy of plasma particles, leading to consequent acceleration.

In rotating magnetospheres the centrifugal force acts differently in different locations, leading to generation of Langmuir waves, or plasma oscillations via the parametric instability. One can show that this mechanism efficiently works in the magnetospheres of AGN and pulsars.

Considering Crab-like pulsars it has been shown that by means of the Landau damping the centrifugally induced electrostatic waves efficiently lose energy transferring it to electrons. It is found that energy gain by electrons is given by

$$\varepsilon \approx \frac{n_p F_\text{reac}\delta r}{n_{_{GJ}}} ,$$	2

where $\delta r\sim c/\Gamma$, $\Gamma$ is the increment of the instability (for details see the cited article), $F_\text{reac} \approx 2mc \Omega\xi(r)^{-3}$, $\xi (r) = \left(1 - \Omega^2 r^2/c^2\right)^{1/2}$, $n_p$ is the plasma number density, $m$ is the electron's mass and $n_{_{GJ}}$ is the Goldreich-Julian density. One can show that for typical parameters of the Crab-like pulsars, the particles might gain energies of the order of 100s of TeVs or even PeVs. In case of millisecond newly born pulsars, the electrons might be accelerated to even higher energies of 10^{18} eV or EeVs

By examining the magnetospheres of AGNs, the acceleration of protons takes place through the Langmuir collapse. As it is shown this mechanism is strong enough to guarantee efficient acceleration of particles to ultra-high energies via the Langmuir damping

$$\varepsilon_p \approx 6.4 \times 10^{17} \mathrm{eV} \times \left(\frac{L_{42}}{M_8}\right)^{5/2},$$

where $L_{42}\equiv L/({10}^{42}\mathrm{erg}/\mathrm{s})$ is the normalized luminosity of AGN, $M_8 \equiv M/(10^8M_{\odot})$ is its normalized mass and $M_{\odot}$ is the Solar mass. As it is evident, for a convenient set of parameters one can achieve enormous energies of the order of 10^{21} eV or ZeVs, so AGNs become cosmic Zevatrons.

== Further references ==
- Gudavadze, Irakli; Osmanov, Zaza; Rogava, Andria (2015). "On the role of rotation in the outflows of the Crab pulsar". International Journal of Modern Physics D. 24 (6): 1550042. arXiv:1411.7241. Bibcode:2015IJMPD..2450042G. doi:10.1142/S021827181550042X. S2CID 118584645.
- Osmanov, Zaza (2013). "On the Role of the Curvature Drift Instability in the Dynamics of Electrons in Active Galactic Nuclei". International Journal of Modern Physics D. 22 (13): 1350081. arXiv:0907.4268. Bibcode:2013IJMPD..2250081O. doi:10.1142/S0218271813500818. S2CID 119158003.
- Osmanov, Z. (2010). "Is very high energy emission from the BL Lac 1ES 0806+524 centrifugally driven?". New Astronomy. 15 (4): 351–355. arXiv:0901.1235. Bibcode:2010NewA...15..351O. doi:10.1016/j.newast.2009.10.001. S2CID 119192197.
- Osmanov, Z.; Shapakidze, D.; Machabeli, G. (2009). "Dynamical feedback of the curvature drift instability on its saturation process" (PDF). Astronomy and Astrophysics. 503 (1): 19–24. arXiv:0711.0295. Bibcode:2009A&A...503...19O. doi:10.1051/0004-6361/200912113. S2CID 15342835.
- Osmanov, Z. (2008). "Efficiency of the centrifugally induced curvature drift instability in AGN winds" (PDF). Astronomy and Astrophysics. 490 (2): 487–492. arXiv:0803.0395. Bibcode:2008A&A...490..487O. doi:10.1051/0004-6361:200809710. S2CID 17264617.
- Osmanov, Z.; Dalakishvili, G.; Machabeli, G. (2008). "On the reconstruction of a magnetosphere of pulsars nearby the light cylinder surface". Monthly Notices of the Royal Astronomical Society. 383 (3): 1007–1014. Bibcode:2008MNRAS.383.1007O. doi:10.1111/j.1365-2966.2007.12543.x.
- Rogava, Andria; Dalakishvili, George; Osmanov, Zaza (2003). "Centrifugally Driven Relativistic Dynamics on Curved Trajectories". General Relativity and Gravitation. 35 (7): 1133–1152. arXiv:astro-ph/0303602. Bibcode:2003GReGr..35.1133R. doi:10.1023/A:1024450105374. S2CID 119440652.
