= Alexander Abashian =

American particle physicist (1930–2014)

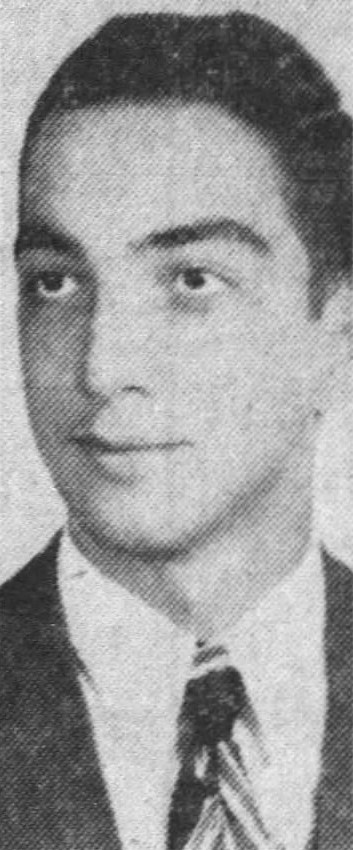
- Alexander Abashian in 1957
- Born: March 11, 1930
- Died: February 12, 2014 (aged 83); Baltimore, MD
- Education: Purdue University (BSc); Johns Hopkins University (PhD)
- Spouse: Dorothy VanDeMar
- Children: 4
- Awards: Fellow, American Physical Society; Fellow, American Association for the Advancement of Science
- Scientific career
- Fields: Particle physics
- Institutions: University of Illinois, Urbana-Champaign; Virginia Tech

Alexander Abashian (11 March 1930 – 12 February 2014) was an American particle physicist. His research interests included properties of electroweak interactions, tests of symmetry principles, searches for new particles, and detector and accelerator facilities development.

== Early life and education ==
Alexander Abashian was born on March 11, 1930. His parents were Armenian and immigrated to the United States from Musa Ler and Kessab. Abashian received his Bachelor of Science in physics from Purdue University in 1952 and a doctorate in physics from Johns Hopkins University in 1957. While earning his doctorate, he worked as a research assistant at Brookhaven National Lab from 1955 to 1957.

== Career ==
Abashian began his teaching career as an instructor at the University of Rochester from 1957 until 1959, at which point he joined the Lawrence Berkeley National Lab as a staff associate. He joined the University of Illinois in 1961 as an assistant professor of physics, eventually working his way to full professor by 1966. From 1970-1971, he was a member of the research division within the high-energy physics program of the United States Atomic Energy Commission.

Early in his career at UIUC, Abashian conducted experiments on the CP violation of k mesons, which were similar to experiments being conducted at Princeton at the same time by James W. Cronin and Val L. Fitch. Cronin and Fitch went on to receive the 1980 Nobel Prize in Physics for their discovery. In 1983, Abashian published a letter to the editor in Physics Today calling attention to his experiments and claiming that Princeton's group underhandedly rushed publication of their results to get out ahead of the Illinois group.

Abashian left UIUC in 1972 to become a program director in elementary particle physics at the National Science Foundation. He stayed there until 1980, with a brief period as a visiting physicist at CERN in 1978. In 1980, he joined Virginia Polytechnic Institute and State University (now known as Virginia Tech) as the Physics Department head, where he taught until his retirement in 1997 as professor emeritus. He served as director of the Institute for High Energy Physics at Virginia Tech from 1987 until 1990.

In 2000, Abashian accepted a position as director of the Center for the Advancement of Natural Discoveries using Light Emission, or CANDLE, which aimed to build a 3 GeV third-generation light source from scratch in the Armenian capital of Yerevan. The project was championed by the Armenian-American property magnate, Jirair Hovnanian, and supported by the Armenian government and the US State Department.

== Awards and honors ==
- Fellow, American Physical Society (1969)
- Outstanding Performance and Special Achievement Award, National Science Foundation (1978)
- Superior Accomplishment Award, National Science Foundation (1980)
- Fellow, American Association for the Advancement of Science (1985)

== Personal life ==
Abashian married Dorothy VanDeMar on September 7, 1957; they remained married until her death in 2009. The couple raised four children, one of whom died in 1988 at the age of 29. Abashian died on February 12, 2014.
