= Georgy Zatsepin =

Georgy Timofeyevich Zatsepin (Russian: Гео́ргий Тимофе́евич Заце́пин; 28 May [O.S. 15 May] 1917 – 8 March 2010) was a Soviet and Russian astrophysicist known for his works in cosmic ray physics and neutrino astrophysics.

== Biography ==
He was born in Moscow. Zatsepin graduated from the Faculty of Physics of the Moscow State University in 1941 and worked for three years at an aircraft building plant in Moscow and later in Irkutsk. He entered aspirantura of the faculty in 1944 and six years later defended dissertation "Density spectrum of Extensive Air Showers" for Candidate of Sciences degree. Prior to this, in 1947-1949 he developed methods of studying and using experimental data discovered, that they are based on nuclear cascade process, with electron-photon processes being secondary. Since 1950 he works as senior research assistant at the Lebedev Physical Institute. In 1951 he was awarded the Stalin Prize for discovering the nuclear cascade process. He defended dissertation "Nuclear-cascade process and EAS" for Doctor of Sciences degree in 1954 and became professor in 1958.

In the 1960s Zatsepin predicted Greisen–Zatsepin–Kuzmin limit. In the same period he begin research of muons and neutrinos laying foundations of neutrino astronomy and neutrino astrophysics. At the neutrino laboratory created by him in Lebedev Physical Institute methods of solar neutrino detection were developed. He became Corresponding Member of the Academy of Sciences of the Soviet Union in 1968 and Full Member in 1981. In 1982 Zatsepin was awarded Lenin Prize for creating Station of Cosmic Rays of the Yakut Scientific-Research Base of the Academy of Sciences of the Soviet Union. For creating the Baksan Neutrino Observatory, and conducting experiments there he was awarded the State Prize of the Russian Federation in 1998. In 1999 he was awarded the Ó Ceallaigh Medal by the IUPAP Cosmic Ray Commission for contributions to cosmic ray physics.

Zatsepin was also awarded the Order of the Red Banner of Labour in 1975 and 1981, Order of the October Revolution in 1987. Until 2006 was the chairman of the Cosmic Rays and Space Physics Chair of the MSU Skobeltsyn Institute of Nuclear Physics.

He died in Moscow on 8 March 2010, aged 92.

== Sources ==
- Georgy Zatsepin at the Institute for Nuclear Research of the Russian Academy of Sciences
