= Akeno Giant Air Shower Array =

Coordinates: 35.786966°N 138.47625°E

The Akeno Giant Air Shower Array (AGASA) was an array of particle detectors designed to study the origin of ultra-high-energy cosmic rays. It was deployed from 1987 to 1991 and decommissioned in 2004. It consisted of 111 scintillation detectors and 27 muon detectors spread over an area of 100 km^{2}. It was operated by the Institute for Cosmic Ray Research, University of Tokyo at the Akeno Observatory.

== Results ==
The results from AGASA were used to calculate the energy spectrum and anisotropy of cosmic rays. The results helped to confirm the existence of ultra-high energy cosmic rays (>5×10^{19} eV), such as the so-called "Oh-My-God" particle that was observed by the Fly's Eye experiment run by the University of Utah.

The Telescope Array, a merger of the AGASA and High Resolution Fly's Eye (HiRes) groups, and the Pierre Auger Observatory have improved on the results from AGASA by building larger, hybrid detectors and collecting greater quantities of more precise data.

== See also ==
- Cosmic Ray System (CR instrument on the Voyagers)
- CREDO
- Extragalactic cosmic ray
- Gamma-ray astronomy and X-ray astronomy
- Gamma-ray telescopes (Alphabetic list)
