= Greisen–Zatsepin–Kuzmin limit =

Theoretical upper limit on the energy of cosmic ray protons

The Greisen–Zatsepin–Kuzmin limit (GZK limit or GZK cutoff) is a theoretical upper limit on the energy of cosmic ray protons traveling from other galaxies through the intergalactic medium. The limit is 5×10^{19} eV, or about 8 joules (the energy of a proton traveling extremely near the speed of light). The limit is set by the slowing effect of interactions of the protons with the microwave background radiation over distances in excess of about 160 million light-years. The limit is the same order of magnitude as the upper limit for energy at which cosmic rays have been detected, although some detected rays appear to have exceeded the limit. For example, one extreme-energy cosmic ray, the Oh-My-God Particle, was measured at a record-breaking 3.12×10^{20} eV (50 joules) of energy (about the same as the kinetic energy of a 95 km/h baseball).

In the past, the apparent violation of the GZK limit inspired cosmologists and theoretical physicists to suggest other ways that circumvent the limit. These theories propose that ultra-high energy cosmic rays are produced nearby the Milky Way galaxy or that Lorentz covariance is violated in such a way that protons do not lose energy on their way through space.

== Computation ==
The limit was independently computed in 1966 by Kenneth Greisen, Georgy Zatsepin, and Vadim Kuzmin based on interactions between cosmic rays and the photons of the cosmic microwave background radiation (CMB). They predicted that cosmic rays with energies over the threshold energy of 5×10^{19} eV would interact with cosmic microwave background photons $\gamma_{\rm CMB},$ relatively blueshifted by the speed of the cosmic rays, to produce pions through the $\Delta$ resonance,
$$p + \gamma_\text{CMB} \to \Delta^+ \to p + \pi^0 \;,$$
or
$$p + \gamma_\text{CMB} \to \Delta^+ \to n + \pi^+ ~.$$
Pions produced in this manner proceed to decay in the standard pion channels. Neutrons also decay to similar products, so that ultimately the energy of any cosmic ray proton is drained off by production of high-energy photons plus (in the case of a positively charged pion) high-energy electron–positron pairs and neutrino pairs.

The pion production process begins at a higher energy than ordinary electron-positron pair production from protons impacting the CMB, which starts at cosmic-ray proton energies of only about 10^{17} eV. However, pion production events drain 20% of the energy of a cosmic-ray proton, as compared with only 0.1% of its energy for electron–positron pair production.

This factor of 200 comes from two causes: the pion has a mass only about ~130 times the leptons, but the extra energy appears as different kinetic energies of the pion or leptons, and results in relatively more kinetic energy transferred to a heavier product pion, in order to conserve momentum. The much larger total energy losses from pion production result in pion production becoming the process limiting high-energy cosmic-ray travel, rather than the lower-energy process of light-lepton production.

The pion production process continues until the cosmic ray energy falls below the threshold for pion production. Due to the mean path associated with this interaction, extragalactic cosmic ray protons traveling over distances larger than 163 Mly and with energies greater than the threshold should never be observed on Earth. This distance is also known as GZK horizon.

The precise GZK limit is derived under the assumption that ultra-high energy cosmic rays, those with energies above 1×10^{18} eV, are protons. Measurements by the largest cosmic-ray observatory, the Pierre Auger Observatory, suggest that most ultra-high energy cosmic rays are heavier elements known as HZE ions. In this case, the argument behind the GZK limit does not apply in the originally simple form: however, as Greisen noted, the giant dipole resonance also occurs roughly in this energy range (at 10 EeV/nucleon) and similarly restricts very long-distance propagation.

== GZK paradox ==
Unsolved problem in physics
Why is it that some cosmic rays appear to possess energies that are theoretically too high, given that there are no possible near-Earth sources, and that rays from distant sources should have scattered by the cosmic microwave background radiation?
More unsolved problems in physics

A number of observations have been made by the largest cosmic-ray experiments Akeno Giant Air Shower Array (AGASA), High Resolution Fly's Eye Cosmic Ray Detector, the Pierre Auger Observatory and Telescope Array Project that appeared to show cosmic rays with energies above the GZK limit. These observations appear to contradict the predictions of special relativity and particle physics as they are presently understood. However, there are a number of possible explanations for these observations that may resolve this inconsistency.

- The observed EECR particles can be heavier nuclei instead of protons
- The observations could be due to an instrument error or an incorrect interpretation of the experiment, especially wrong energy assignment.
- The cosmic rays could have local sources within the GZK horizon (although it is unclear what these sources could be).

=== Weakly interacting particles ===
Another suggestion involves ultra-high-energy weakly interacting particles (for instance, neutrinos), which might be created at great distances and later react locally to give rise to the particles observed. In the proposed Z-burst model, an ultra-high-energy cosmic neutrino collides with a relic anti-neutrino in our galaxy and annihilates to hadrons. This process proceeds through a (virtual) Z-boson:
$$\nu + \bar{\nu} \to \text{Z} \to \text{hadrons}.$$

The cross-section for this process becomes large if the center-of-mass energy of the neutrino antineutrino pair is equal to the Z-boson mass (such a peak in the cross-section is called "resonance"). Assuming that the relic anti-neutrino is at rest, the energy of the incident cosmic neutrino has to be
$$E = \frac{{m_\text{Z}}^2}{2 m_\nu} = 4.2 \times 10^{21} \left(\frac{\text{eV}}{m_\nu}\right)~\text{eV},$$
where $m_\text{Z}$ is the mass of the Z-boson, and $m_\nu$ the mass of the neutrino.

== Controversy about cosmic rays above the GZK limit ==
A suppression of the cosmic-ray flux that can be explained with the GZK limit has been confirmed by the latest generation of cosmic-ray observatories. A former claim by the AGASA experiment that there is no suppression was overruled. It remains controversial whether the suppression is due to the GZK effect. The GZK limit only applies if ultra-high-energy cosmic rays are mostly protons.

In July 2007, during the 30th International Cosmic Ray Conference in Mérida, Yucatán, México, the High Resolution Fly's Eye Experiment (HiRes) and the Pierre Auger Observatory (Auger) presented their results on ultra-high-energy cosmic rays (UHECR). HiRes observed a suppression in the UHECR spectrum at just the right energy, observing only 13 events with an energy above the threshold, while expecting 43 with no suppression. This was interpreted as the first observation of the GZK limit. Auger confirmed the flux suppression, but did not claim it to be the GZK limit: instead of the 30 events necessary to confirm the AGASA results, Auger saw only two, which are believed to be heavy-nuclei events. The flux suppression was previously brought into question when the AGASA experiment found no suppression in their spectrum. According to Alan Watson, former spokesperson for the Auger Collaboration, AGASA results have been shown to be incorrect, possibly due to the systematic shift in energy assignment.

In 2010 and the following years, both the Pierre Auger Observatory and HiRes confirmed again a flux suppression, in case of the Pierre Auger Observatory the effect is statistically significant at the level of 20 standard deviations.

After the flux suppression was established, a heated debate ensued whether cosmic rays that violate the GZK limit are protons. The Pierre Auger Observatory, the world's largest observatory, found with high statistical significance that ultra-high-energy cosmic rays are not purely protons, but a mixture of elements, which is getting heavier with increasing energy. The Telescope Array Project, a joint effort from members of the HiRes and AGASA collaborations, agrees with the former HiRes result that these cosmic rays look like protons. The claim is based on data with lower statistical significance, however. The area covered by Telescope Array is about one third of the area covered by the Pierre Auger Observatory, and the latter has been running for a longer time.

The controversy was partially resolved in 2017, when a joint working group formed by members of both experiments presented a report at the 35th International Cosmic Ray Conference. According to the report, the raw experimental results are not in contradiction with each other. The different interpretations are mainly based on the use of different theoretical models and the fact that Telescope Array has not collected enough events yet to distinguish the pure-proton hypothesis from the mixed-nuclei hypothesis.

=== Extreme Universe Space Observatory on Japanese Experiment Module (JEM-EUSO) ===
EUSO, which was scheduled to fly on the International Space Station (ISS) in 2009, was designed to use the atmospheric-fluorescence technique to monitor a huge area and boost the statistics of UHECRs considerably. EUSO is to make a deep survey of UHECR-induced extensive air showers (EASs) from space, extending the measured energy spectrum well beyond the GZK cutoff. It is to search for the origin of UHECRs, determine the nature of the origin of UHECRs, make an all-sky survey of the arrival direction of UHECRs, and seek to open the astronomical window on the extreme-energy universe with neutrinos. The fate of the EUSO Observatory is still unclear, since NASA is considering early retirement of the ISS.

=== The Fermi Gamma-ray Space Telescope ===
Launched in June 2008, the Fermi Gamma-ray Space Telescope (formerly GLAST) will also provide data that will help resolve these inconsistencies.

- With the Fermi Gamma-ray Space Telescope, one has the possibility of detecting gamma rays from the freshly accelerated cosmic-ray nuclei at their acceleration site (the source of the UHECRs).
- UHECR protons accelerated (see also Centrifugal mechanism of acceleration) in astrophysical objects produce secondary electromagnetic cascades during propagation in the cosmic microwave and infrared backgrounds, of which the GZK process of pion production is one of the contributors. Such cascades can contribute between about 1% and 50% of the GeV–TeV diffuse photon flux measured by the EGRET experiment. The Fermi Gamma-ray Space Telescope may discover this flux.

== See also ==
- Ultra-high-energy cosmic ray – Cosmic-ray particle with a kinetic energy above 1 EeV
