= JEM-EUSO =

Series of space mission

The Joint Exploratory Missions for Extreme Universe Space Observatory (JEM-EUSO) are a series of space missions devoted to the investigation of cosmic rays and neutrinos of extreme energy (E > 5×10^{19} eV). Using the Earth's atmosphere as a giant detector, the detection is performed by looking at the streak of fluorescence produced when such a particle interacts with the Earth's atmosphere. The Mini-EUSO was attached to the Zvezda module of the International Space Station (ISS), and started observation from October 2019.

== EUSO ==
EUSO was a mission of the European Space Agency, designed to be hosted on the ISS as an external payload of the Columbus. EUSO successfully completed the "Phase A" study, however in 2004, ESA decided not to proceed with the mission because of programmatic and financial constraints. The mission was then re-oriented as a payload to be hosted on board the JEM module of the Japanese KIBO facility of the ISS. The mission was then renamed JEM-EUSO.

== JEM-EUSO ==
JEM-EUSO (Extreme Universe Space Observatory onboard Japanese Experiment Module) is currently (2013) studied by RIKEN and JAXA, in collaboration with 95 other institutions from 16 countries aiming for a flight after 2020. The proposed instrument consists of a set of three large Fresnel lenses of 2.65-metre diameter (with top and bottom cut off to reduce the minimum diameter to 1.9-metre so that they fit in the HTV resupply vehicle in which the instrument is to be launched) feeding a detector consisting of 137 modules each a 48 x 48 array of photomultipliers. The imaging takes place in the 300 nm-450 nm band (low-energy UV through deep-blue), and photons are time-tagged with 2.5-microsecond precision.

=== Orbital debris detection ===
In addition to its main, science mission, EUSO might also be used to detect orbiting space junk that could pose a threat to ISS, that is too small to be spotted by astronomers (1 to 10 cm). The ISS is shielded adequately against particles that are smaller than 1 cm. Particles in this range, or larger, can inflict serious damage, especially to other objects in orbit, since many of them are traveling at speeds of about 36,000 km/h. Nearly 3,000 tons of space debris resides in low Earth orbit; more than 700,000 pieces of debris larger than 1 cm now orbit Earth. A laser might then be used to deflect dangerous particles. The project could be ready to implement after about 2017–2018, using better lasers.

=== Other projects under the EUSO framework ===
- EUSO-TA (Extreme Universe Space Observatory-Telescope Array): a ground-based telescope designed to prove the technology of EUSO telescopes. Was installed at Black Rock Mesa, Utah, United States at one of the Telescope Array fluorescence detectors in March 2013 (first observations in 2015). The experiment was on-going in 2018. The experiment has detected some UHECR-events (Ultra High Energy Cosmic Ray).
- EUSO-Balloon: a balloon-based EUSO telescope meant to further validate the technology. The balloon flight took place in 2014 in Canada and lasted 5 hours. The telescope observed laser-simulated cosmic ray events.
- EUSO-SPB (EUSO-Super Pressure Balloon): a high-altitude heavy-lift balloon EUSO telescope. Launched in 2017 from New Zealand (EUSO-SPB1-mission). The flight took 13 days, but was cut substantially shorter than the planned 100 days. Second mission (EUSO-SPB2) is planned for 2021.
- TUS (Tracking Ultraviolet Setup): a Russian mission on board the Lomonosov-satellite (launched 2016); included in the EUSO program as of 2018 (originally was not part of EUSO program).
- Mini-EUSO: an ultraviolet telescope operated at the ISS. The telescope serves as a pathfinder mission for UCHER-missions in space and maps the ultraviolet background produced by Earth atmosphere. The mapping of the UV-background is important for the follow-up missions K-EUSO and JEM-EUSO. The mission started as a co-operation between Italian Space Agency and Russian Space Agency. The Mini-EUSO telescope was launched to ISS on 22 August 2019.
- K-EUSO (KLYPVE-EUSO; KLYPVE is a Russian acronym for extreme energy cosmic rays): a Russian Space Agency project to place an UHECR telescope in the Russian segment of ISS. The project builds upon the TUS-experiment of the Russian Lomonosov-satellite. In 2017, the launch was scheduled for 2022.
- JEM-EUSO (Japanese Experiment Module-EUSO): the final goal of the JEM-EUSO program is to have the JEM-EUSO telescope installed into ISS.
- POEMMA (Probe Of Multi-Messenger Astrophysics): a dedicated satellite mission (2 satellites) to observe UHECR-events in the atmosphere. As of 2018, it is a NASA-sponsored concept study.
