= CANDLE Synchrotron Research Institute =

Project and research center in Armenia

Center for the Advancement of Natural Discoveries using Light Emission Synchrotron Research Institute
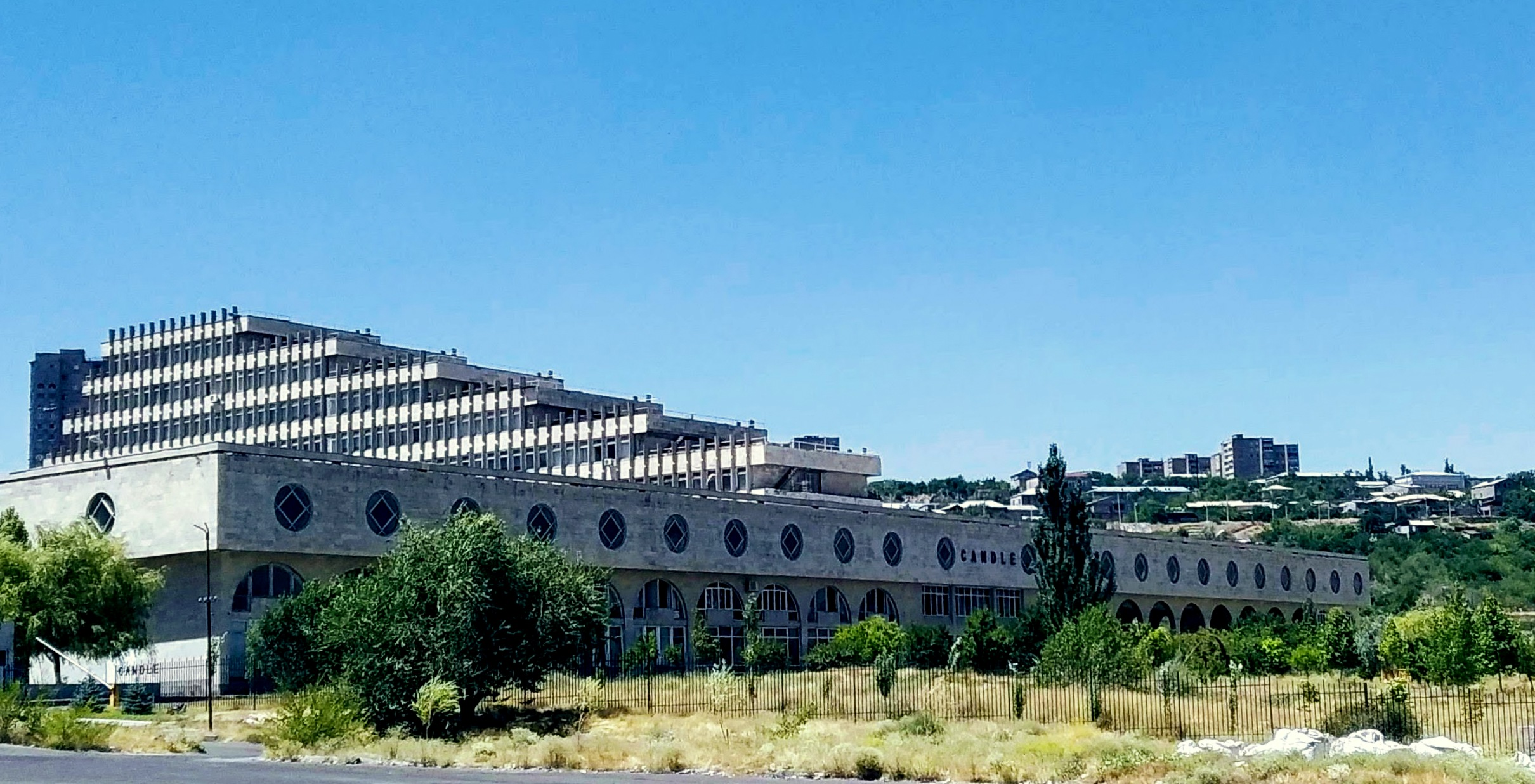
- CANDLE Synchrotron Research Institute
- Type: Public
- Established: 2010
- Affiliations: Ministry of Education and Science of Armenia
- Director: Prof. Vasili Tsakanov
- Location: Yerevan, Armenia; 40°13′21″N 44°33′10″E
- Website: candle.am

The Center for the Advancement of Natural Discoveries using Light Emission, more commonly called the CANDLE Synchrotron Research Institute, is a research institute in Yerevan, Armenia. CANDLE is a project of 3 gigaelectronvolts of energy, a third generation synchrotron light source for fundamental, industrial and applied research in biology, physics, chemistry, medicine, material and environmental sciences.

The government of Armenia allocated an area of 20 hectares near the town of Abovyan for the center's projects.
