= High Resolution Fly's Eye Cosmic Ray Detector =

Ultra-high-energy cosmic ray observatory in Utah, United States

The High Resolution Fly's Eye or HiRes detector was an ultra-high-energy cosmic ray observatory that operated in the West Desert of Utah from 1981 until April 2006. HiRes (HiRes-I, HiRes-II, and HiRes prototype) used the "atmospheric fluorescence" technique that was pioneered by the Utah group first in tests at the Volcano Ranch experiment and then with the original Fly's Eye experiment. The experiment first ran as the HiRes prototype in a tower configuration operating in conjunction with the CASA (Chicago Air Shower Array) and MIA (Michigan Muon Array). The prototype was later reconfigured to view 360 degrees in azimuth. HiRes-II followed later and was located on a hilltop about 13km away. HiRes-I and HiRes-II operated in stereo. In 1991 it discovered the Oh-My-God particle.

== Hardware and development ==
The High Resolution Fly's Eye used larger mirrors and smaller pixels as compared with the original Fly's Eye, hence the name. A prototype of the HiRes experiment operated between 1993 and 1996 at the original Fly's Eye-I site (Five Mile Hill). It was configured in a tower viewing a narrow wedge of sky from 3–73 degrees in elevation. First the Utah ground array and later the CASA and MIA (ground array and muon array) experiments were placed on the surface in the view of the HiRes prototype. This then became the first "hybrid experiment" collecting information both on the development of the air shower induced by the incident cosmic ray, but also measuring the shower's footprint at the Earth's surface and 3 m below surface (with the buried muon array). The HiRes prototype was disassembled early in 1997 to become part of the final HiRes configuration.

In its final configuration, HiRes was composed of two sites separated by 12.6 km. The sites were located on hilltops in Dugway Proving Grounds, a U.S. Army test facility in the West Desert of Utah. HiRes-I (located on Five Mile Hill or Little Granite Mountain^{(40.1953°N 112.8363°W)}) had one ring of 22 telescopes viewing from 3–17 degrees in elevation. HiRes-I was instrumented with sample and hold electronics which took a "snapshot" of the extensive air shower generated when the incident cosmic ray interacted with the atmosphere. Meanwhile, HiRes-II (located on Camel's Back Ridge ^{(40.13194°N 112.95896°W)}) had two rings of telescopes (42 telescopes) The first set viewed between 3 and 17 degrees elevation while the second set viewed 17 to 31 degrees in elevation. Thus the total field of view was 3 to 31 degrees in elevation and ~350 degrees in azimuth.

HiRes-II was instrumented with a flash analog to digital converter (FADC) so that it essentially made movies of the cosmic ray events. Both observatory sites provided full azimuthal coverage (360 degrees in azimuth). They were operated independently on moonless clear nights. The duty cycle of HiRes was close to 10%.

== Accomplishments ==
The HiRes discovered the Oh-My-God particle, an ultra-high-energy cosmic ray, on 15 October 1991.

The HiRes experiment made the first observation of the Greisen–Zatsepin–Kuzmin limit (GZK cutoff) which is an indication of the highest energy cosmic rays interacting with the cosmic microwave background and the universe becoming opaque to their propagation.

In 2010 final results of the HiRes experiment confirmed the GZK cutoff.

A follow-on experiment to the High Resolution Fly's Eye and Akeno Giant Air Shower Array (AGASA) experiments is the Telescope Array Project which began data collection in central Utah in 2007. A similar approach, but with the water-Cherenkov detectors, has been employed for the Pierre Auger Observatory which began collecting data in 2004.

== Awards ==
Dr. Pierre Sokolsky and Dr. George Cassidy, both of the University of Utah, received the 2007 Panofsky Prize for their work on the HiRes experiment.

== See also ==
- List of astronomical observatories
