= Oh-My-God particle =

Ultra-high-energy cosmic ray detected in 1991

The Oh-My-God particle (as physicists dubbed it) was an ultra-high-energy cosmic ray detected on 15 October 1991 by the Fly's Eye camera in Dugway Proving Ground, Utah, United States. As of 2026, it is the highest-energy cosmic ray ever observed. Its energy was estimated as (3.2±0.9)×10^{20} eV (320 exaelectronvolt). The particle's energy was unexpected and called into question prevailing theories about the origin and propagation of cosmic rays.

== Speed ==
Although most high-energy cosmic rays are protons, it is not known what the ultra-high-energy Oh-My-God particle was. A 2025 study of neutrinos produced by collisions between protons and photons shows that for very high-energy cosmic rays fewer than about 70% are protons, the others probably being heavy ions such as iron.

If $m_\mathrm{p}$ is the rest mass of the particle and $E_\mathrm{K}$ is its kinetic energy (energy above the rest mass energy), then its speed was very close to $\sqrt{1-[m_\mathrm{p}c^2/(E_\mathrm{K}+m_\mathrm{p}c^2)]^2}$ times the speed of light. Since $E_\mathrm{K} \gg m_\mathrm{p}c^2$, this ratio can be simplified to $1-\frac{1}{2}[m_\mathrm{p}c^2/E_\mathrm{K}]^2$. If it was a proton, for which $m_\mathrm{p}c^2$ is 938 MeV, this means it was traveling at 0.9999999999999999999999957 times the speed of light, its Lorentz factor was 3.2×10^{11}, and its rapidity was 27.1. This is 1.3 femtometers per second less than the speed of light, so if a photon were traveling alongside the proton, it would take over 245,000 years for the photon to gain a 1 cm lead, as seen from the Earth's reference frame. Due to special relativity, the relativistic time dilation experienced by a proton traveling at this speed would be extreme. If the proton originated from a distance of 1.5 billion light years, it would take approximately 1.71 days in the reference frame of the proton to travel that distance, as determined by application of the relativistic time dilation equation.

By the same formula, if the particle was an iron ion with the same kinetic energy, then its speed would have been "only" 0.999999999999999999987 times the speed of light.

== Collision energy ==
The energy of the particle was some 40 million times that of the highest-energy protons that have been produced in any terrestrial particle accelerator. However, only a small fraction of this energy was available for its interaction with a nucleus in the Earth's atmosphere, with most of the energy remaining in the form of kinetic energy of the center of mass of the products of the interaction. If $m_\mathrm{t}$ is the mass of the "target" nucleus, the energy available for such a collision is
$$\sqrt{ 2E_\mathrm{K}m_\mathrm{t}c^2+(m_\mathrm{p}+m_\mathrm{t})^2c^4 }-(m_\mathrm{p}+m_\mathrm{t})c^2$$
which for large $E_\mathrm{K}$ is approximately
$$\sqrt{ 2E_\mathrm{K}m_\mathrm{t}c^2}.$$
For the Oh-My-God particle hitting a nitrogen nucleus, this gives 2900 TeV, which is roughly 200 times higher than the highest collision energy of the Large Hadron Collider, in which two high-energy particles going opposite directions collide. In the center-of-mass frame of reference (which was moving, in Earth's frame of reference, at almost the speed of light), the products of the collision would therefore have had around 2900 TeV of energy. This would have transformed the nucleus into many particles moving apart at almost light speed in the center-of-mass frame of reference. As with other cosmic rays, the collision generated a cascade of relativistic particles as the particles interacted with other nuclei.

== Comparisons ==
The Oh-My-God particle had 10^{20} (100 quintillion) times the photon energy of visible light, equivalent to a 140-gram (5 oz) baseball travelling at about 28 m/s (100 km/h; 63 mph). Its energy was 20 million times greater than the highest photon energy measured in electromagnetic radiation emitted by an extragalactic object, the blazar Markarian 501.

== Later similar events ==
Since the first observation, hundreds of similar events (energy 5.7×10^{19} eV or greater) have been recorded, confirming the phenomenon. These ultra-high-energy cosmic ray particles are very rare; the energy of most cosmic ray particles is between 10^{7} eV and 10^{10} eV.

More recent studies using the Telescope Array Project have suggested a source of the particles within a 20 degree radius "warm spot" in the direction of the constellation Ursa Major.

The Amaterasu particle, named after the sun goddess in Japanese mythology, was detected in 2021 and later identified in 2023, using the Telescope Array observatory in Utah, United States. It had an energy exceeding 240 exa-electron volts (2.4×10^{20} eV). This particle appears to have emerged from the Local Void, an empty area of space bordering the Milky Way galaxy. It contained an amount of energy comparable to dropping a brick from the height of the waist. No promising astronomical object matching the direction from which the cosmic ray arrived has been identified.

== See also ==
- Greisen–Zatsepin–Kuzmin limit – Theoretical upper limit on the energy of cosmic ray protons
- HZE ion – High-energy, heavy ions of cosmic origin
- Solar energetic particles – High-energy particles from the Sun
- Wow! signal – 1977 radio signal detected as part of SETI
