= Volcano Ranch experiment =

Array of particle detectors

Coordinates: 35°9′N 106°47′W

The Volcano Ranch experiment was an array of particle detectors in Volcano Ranch, New Mexico, used to measure ultra-high-energy cosmic rays. The array was built by John Linsley and Livio Scarsi in 1959. On February 22, 1962, Linsley observed an air shower at Volcano Ranch created by a primary particle with an energy greater than 10^{20} eV, the highest energy cosmic ray particle ever detected at the time. Linsley continued to operate Volcano Ranch until 1978, when it was closed due to lack of funding.
