= Ultra-high-energy cosmic ray =

Cosmic-ray particle with a kinetic energy above 1 EeV

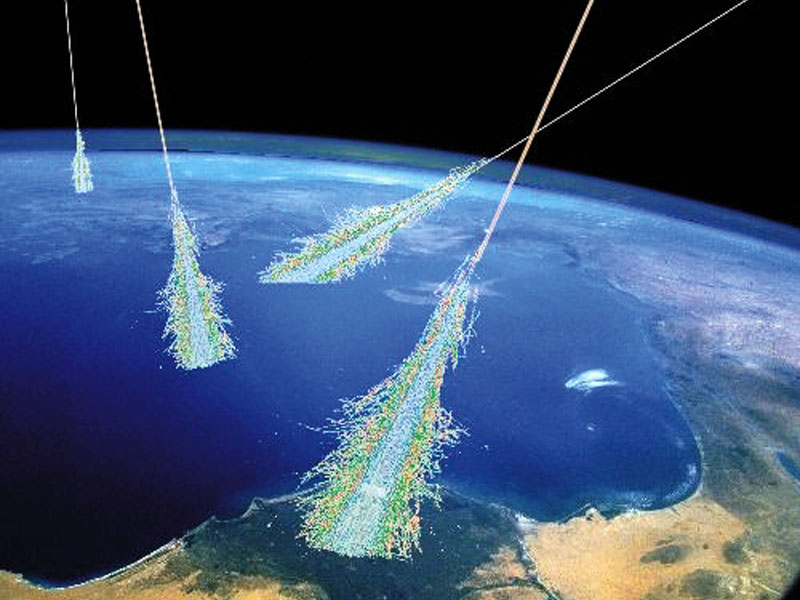
An illustration of air showers created by very high energy cosmic rays

In astroparticle physics, an ultra-high-energy cosmic ray (UHECR) is a cosmic ray with an energy greater than 1 EeV (10^{18} electronvolts, approximately 0.16 joules), far beyond both the rest mass and energies typical of other cosmic ray particles. The origin of these highest energy cosmic rays is not known.

These particles are rare; between 2004 and 2007, the initial runs of the Pierre Auger Observatory (PAO) detected 27 events with estimated arrival energies above 5.7×10^{19} eV, that is, about one such event every four weeks in the 3000 km^{2} (1200 mi^{2}) area surveyed by the observatory.

== Observational history ==
The first observation of a cosmic ray particle with an energy exceeding 1.0×10^{20} eV (16 J) was made by John Linsley and Livio Scarsi at the Volcano Ranch experiment in New Mexico in 1962.

Cosmic ray particles with even higher energies have since been observed. Among them was the Oh-My-God particle observed by the University of Utah's Fly's Eye experiment on the evening of 15 October 1991 over Dugway Proving Ground, Utah. Its observation was shocking to astrophysicists, who estimated its energy at approximately 3.2×10^{20} eV (50 J)—essentially an atomic nucleus with kinetic energy equal to that of a baseball (5 ounces or 142 grams) that is traveling at about 100 kilometers per hour (60 mph).

The energy of this particle is some 40 million times that of the highest energy protons that have been produced in any terrestrial particle accelerator. However, only a small fraction of this energy would be available for an interaction with a proton or neutron on Earth, with most of the energy remaining in the form of kinetic energy of the products of the interaction (see Collider § Explanation). The effective energy available for such a collision is the square root of double the product of the particle's energy and the mass energy of the proton, which for this particle gives 7.5×10^{14} eV, roughly 50 times the collision energy of the Large Hadron Collider.

Since the first observation, by the University of Utah's Fly's Eye Cosmic Ray Detector, at least fifteen similar events have been recorded, confirming the phenomenon. These very high energy cosmic ray particles are very rare; the energy of most cosmic ray particles is between 10 MeV and 10 GeV.

== Ultra-high-energy cosmic ray observatories ==
- AGASA – Akeno Giant Air Shower Array in Japan
- Antarctic Impulse Transient Antenna (ANITA) detects ultra-high-energy cosmic neutrinos believed to be caused by ultra-high-energy cosmic ray particles
- Extreme Universe Space Observatory
- GRAPES-3 (Gamma Ray Astronomy PeV EnergieS 3rd establishment) is a project for cosmic ray study with air shower detector array and large area muon detectors at Ooty in southern India.
- High Resolution Fly's Eye Cosmic Ray Detector (HiRes)
- MARIACHI – Mixed Apparatus for Radar Investigation of Cosmic-rays of High Ionization located on Long Island, USA.
- Pierre Auger Observatory
- Telescope Array Project
- Yakutsk Extensive Air Shower Array
- Tunka experiment
- The COSMICi project at Florida A&M University is developing technology for a distributed network of low-cost detectors for UHECR showers in collaboration with MARIACHI.
- Cosmic-Ray Extremely Distributed Observatory (CREDO)

=== Pierre Auger Observatory ===
Pierre Auger Observatory is an international cosmic ray observatory designed to detect ultra-high-energy cosmic ray particles (with energies beyond 10^{20} eV). These high-energy particles have an estimated arrival rate of just 1 per square kilometer per century, therefore, in order to record a large number of these events, the Auger Observatory has created a detection area of 3,000 km^{2} (the size of Rhode Island) in Mendoza Province, western Argentina. The Pierre Auger Observatory, in addition to obtaining directional information from the cluster of water-Cherenkov tanks used to observe the cosmic-ray-shower components, also has four telescopes trained on the night sky to observe fluorescence of the nitrogen molecules as the shower particles traverse the sky, giving further directional information on the original cosmic ray particle.

In September 2017, data from 12 years of observations from PAO supported an extragalactic source (outside of Earth's galaxy) for the origin of extremely high energy cosmic rays.

== Suggested origins ==
The origin of these rare highest energy cosmic rays is not known. Since observations find no correlation with the galactic plane and galactic magnetic fields are not strong enough to accelerate particles to these energies, these cosmic rays are believed to have extra-galactic origin.

=== Neutron stars ===
One suggested source of UHECR particles is their origination from neutron stars. In young neutron stars with spin periods of under 10 ms, the magnetohydrodynamic (MHD) forces from the quasi-neutral fluid of superconducting protons and electrons existing in a neutron superfluid accelerate iron nuclei to UHECR velocities. The neutron superfluid in rapidly rotating stars creates a magnetic field of 10^{8} to 10^{11} teslas, at which point the neutron star is classified as a magnetar. This magnetic field is the strongest stable field in the observed universe and creates the relativistic MHD wind believed to accelerate iron nuclei remaining from the supernova to the necessary energy.

Another hypothesized source of UHECRs from neutron stars is during neutron star to strange star combustion. This hypothesis relies on the assumption that strange matter is the ground state of matter, but has no experimental or observational data to support it. Due to the immense gravitational pressures from the neutron star, it is believed that small pockets of matter consisting of up, down, and strange quarks in equilibrium act as a single hadron (as opposed to a number of Σ^{0} baryons). This will then combust the entire star to strange matter, at which point the neutron star becomes a strange star and its magnetic field breaks down because the protons and neutrons in the quasi-neutral fluid have become strangelets. This magnetic field breakdown releases large-amplitude electromagnetic waves (LAEMWs). The LAEMWs accelerate light ion remnants from the supernova to UHECR energies.

"Ultra-high-energy cosmic ray electrons" (defined as electrons with energies of ≥10^{14}eV) might be explained by the centrifugal mechanism of acceleration in the magnetospheres of the Crab-like pulsars. The feasibility of electron acceleration to this energy scale in the Crab Pulsar magnetosphere is supported by the 2019 observation of ultra-high-energy gamma rays coming from the Crab Nebula, a young pulsar with a spin period of 33 ms.

=== Active galactic cores ===
Interactions with blue-shifted cosmic microwave background radiation limit the distance that these particles can travel before losing energy; this is known as the Greisen–Zatsepin–Kuzmin limit or GZK limit.

Results from the Pierre Auger Observatory show that ultra-high-energy cosmic ray arrival directions appear to be correlated with extragalactic supermassive black holes at the center of nearby galaxies called active galactic nuclei (AGN). However, since the angular correlation scale used is fairly large (3.1°), these results do not unambiguously identify the origins of such cosmic ray particles. The AGN could merely be closely associated with the actual sources, for example in galaxies or other astrophysical objects that are clumped with matter on large scales within 100 megaparsecs.

One hypothesis suggests that these cosmic rays are particles accelerated by electromagnetic fields power by black hole spin, however other studies show that final energy of such particles would be limited as they emit gamma radiation in the high curvature gravitational field of the black hole.

Low-luminosity, intermittent Seyfert galaxies may meet the requirements with the formation of a linear accelerator several light years away from the nucleus, yet within their extended ion tori whose UV radiation ensures a supply of ionic contaminants. The corresponding electric fields are small, on the order of 10 V/cm, whereby the observed UHECRs are indicative for the astronomical size of the source. Improved statistics by the Pierre Auger Observatory will be instrumental in identifying the presently tentative association of UHECRs (from the Local Universe) with Seyferts and LINERs.

=== Other possible sources of the particles ===
In addition to neutron stars and active galactic nuclei, the best candidate sources of the UHECR are:

- Supernova remnants
- intergalactic shocks created during the epoch of galaxy formation
- gamma-ray bursts
- relativistic supernovae

== Propagation ==
Ultra-high-energy particles can interact with the photons in the cosmic microwave background while traveling over cosmic distances. This led to a predicted high energy cutoff for those cosmic rays known as the Greisen–Zatsepin–Kuzmin limit (GZK limit) which matches observed cosmic ray spectra.

The propagation of particles can also be affected by cosmic magnetic fields. While there are some studies of galactic magnetic fields, the origin and scale of extragalactic magnetic fields are poorly understood.

== See also ==
- Extragalactic cosmic ray – Type of cosmic ray
- HZE ions – High-energy, heavy ions of cosmic origin
- Solar energetic particles – High-energy particles from the Sun
- Oh-My-God particle – Ultra-high-energy cosmic ray detected in 1991
