= Telescope Array Project =

Research project to observe air showers

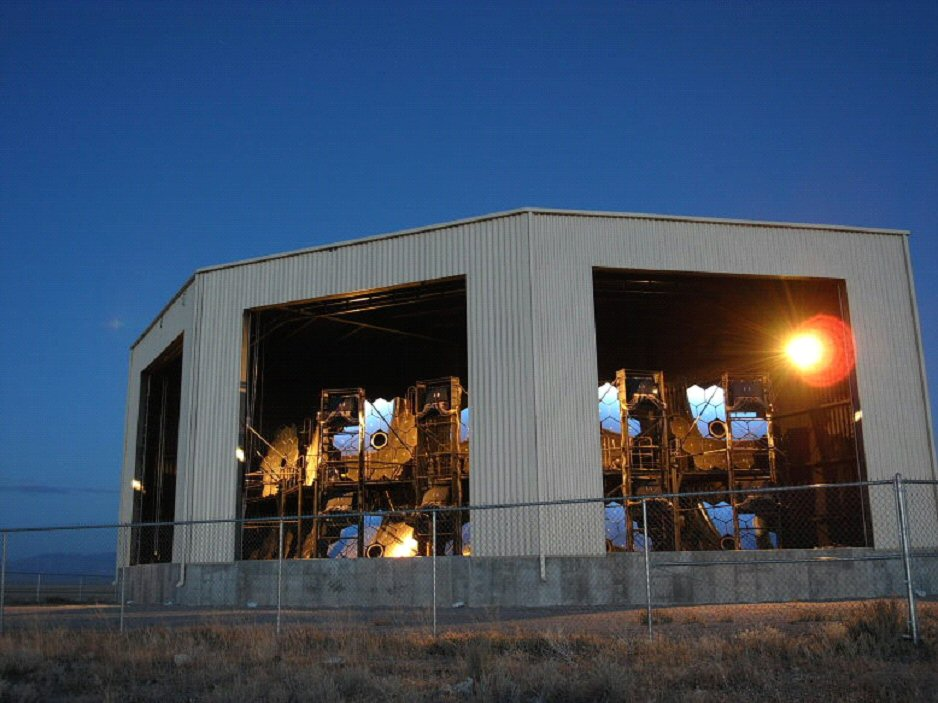
- A view of the Black Rock Mesa FD site with the doors open
- Location(s): Millard County, Utah
- Coordinates: 39°17′49″N 112°54′31″W
- Altitude: 1,400 m (4,600 ft)
- Built: 2003–2007
- First light: 2008
- Website: www.telescopearray.org
- Location of Telescope Array Project
- Related media on Commons

The Telescope Array project is an international collaboration involving research and educational institutions in Japan, The United States, Russia, South Korea, and Belgium. The experiment is designed to observe air showers induced by ultra-high-energy cosmic ray using a combination of ground array and air-fluorescence techniques. It is located in the high desert in Millard County, Utah, United States, at about 1,400 meters (4,600 ft) above sea level.

== Overview ==
An illustration of Telescope Array. Three fluorescence telescopes observe the ultraviolet light given off by an air shower, while an array of surface detectors register the particles as they strike the ground.

The Telescope Array observatory is a hybrid detector system consisting of both an array of 507 scintillation surface detectors (SD) which measure the distribution of charged particles at the Earth's surface, and three fluorescence stations which observe the night sky above the SD array. Each fluorescence station is also accompanied by a LIDAR system for atmospheric monitoring. The SD array is much like that of the AGASA group, but covers an area that is nine times larger. The hybrid setup of the Telescope Array project allows for simultaneous observation of both the longitudinal development and the lateral distribution of the air showers. When a cosmic ray passes through the Earth's atmosphere and triggers an air shower, the fluorescence telescopes measure the scintillation light generated as the shower passes through the gas of the atmosphere, while the array of scintillator surface detectors samples the footprint of the shower when it reaches the Earth's surface.

At the center of the ground array is the Central Laser Facility which is used for atmospheric monitoring and calibrations.

== Surface detector ==
A Scintillator Surface Detector from Telescope Array

The surface detectors that make up the ground array are activated when ionizing particles from an extensive air shower pass through them. When these particles pass through the plastic scintillator within the detector, it induces scintillation photons to be emitted which are then gathered by 96 wavelength-shifting fibers and sent to photomultiplier tubes. The electronic components within the detectors then filter the results, giving the detectors comparable accuracy to the AGASA experiment.

The surface detectors are evenly distributed across a 762 km^{2} grid array with 1.2 km between each unit. Each surface detector has an assembled weight of 250 kg and consists of a power supply, two layers of scintillation detectors and electronics. Power is generated by a 120W solar panel and stored in a sealed lead-acid battery. The system has the capacity to operate for one week in complete darkness. Each scintillation detector layer is made of extruded plastic scintillator that is 1.2 cm thick and has an area of 3m^{2}.

== FD station, telescope, and camera ==
The Telescope Array has three fluorescence detector (FD) telescope stations. As in the previous Fly's Eye and High Resolution Fly's Eye (HiRes) experiments, these detectors work by measuring the air fluorescence light emitted by an extensive air shower. Each FD telescope consists of a primary mirror (made up of 18 smaller hexagonal mirror segments) and a camera. The cameras are made up of 256 photomultiplier tubes (PMTs) which are sensitive to the ultraviolet light generated by a cosmic ray air shower.

The stations are positioned on a triangle about 35 km apart from one another with the Central Laser Facility close to the triangle's center. Each of the three stations has 12–14 telescopes viewing the range from 3°–33° elevation. The three sites are named Black Rock Mesa (BRM), Long Ridge (LR), and Middle Drum (MD). By combining the data from the three sites, it is possible to determine the primary energy, the arrival direction, and the maximum point of longitudinal development for an air shower.

Stations
| Black Rock Mesa | 39°11′18″N 112°42′42″W |
| Long Ridge | 39°12′28″N 113°07′17″W |
| Middle Drum | 39°28′22″N 112°59′37″W |
| Central Laser Facility | 39°17′49″N 112°54′31″W |

== Cosmic Ray Center ==
The Lon and Mary Watson Millard County Cosmic Ray Center was dedicated on March 20, 2006. The center is located at 648 West Main Street in Delta. The building serves as a headquarters and data processing center for the Telescope Array Project.

In October 2011, a new visitor center was opened at the Cosmic Ray Center. It features displays about the history of cosmic ray research in Utah and about the Telescope Array, which is spread across the desert west of Delta. The center also includes a display about the nearby Topaz internment camp, where U.S. citizens of Japanese descent were imprisoned during World War II.

== TALE ==
TALE is the Telescope Array Low Energy extension. It is designed to observe cosmic rays with energies between 3 × 10^{16}eV and 10^{19}eV. TALE adds 10 new telescopes to the Middle Drum observatory site (24 total telescopes) extending the vertical field of view so that it extends from 3 to 59 degrees in elevation. This allows the station to see the shower development including shower maximum for lower energy events. This is critical when trying to determine the chemical composition of the incident cosmic ray particle.

The TALE project also has a graded infill array of scintillator stations spaced 400m and 600m apart. It then connects to the main Telescope Array scintillator array where the scintillator detectors are 1200m apart. These stations measure charged particle densities (the shower footprint) at the Earth's surface for lower energy events approaching 3 × 10^{16}eV

== TARA ==
The Telescope Array RADAR (TARA) Project is an effort to overcome some of the problems inherent to existing cosmic ray detection techniques. Due to sun, moon and weather, fluorescence telescopes are usually limited to a ten percent duty cycle. Ground arrays can run during the day, but require a large amount of land, making it necessary to build them in remote locations. The goal of the TARA Project is to develop a bistatic radar detection system that is able to maintain a 24-hour duty cycle at a fraction of the cost of conventional detection systems.

In September 2012, the W. M. Keck Foundation awarded researchers at the University of Utah a $1 million grant to develop a bistatic radar detection system. This system will be built alongside the existing Telescope Array and will use analog television transmitters and digital receivers to observe the range, direction and strength of cosmic rays in order to trace them back to their point of origin. Once completed, this new facility will be known as the W.M. Keck Radar Observatory

== See also ==
- Amaterasu particle
