= Cosmic-ray observatory =

Installation built to detect high-energy-particles coming from space

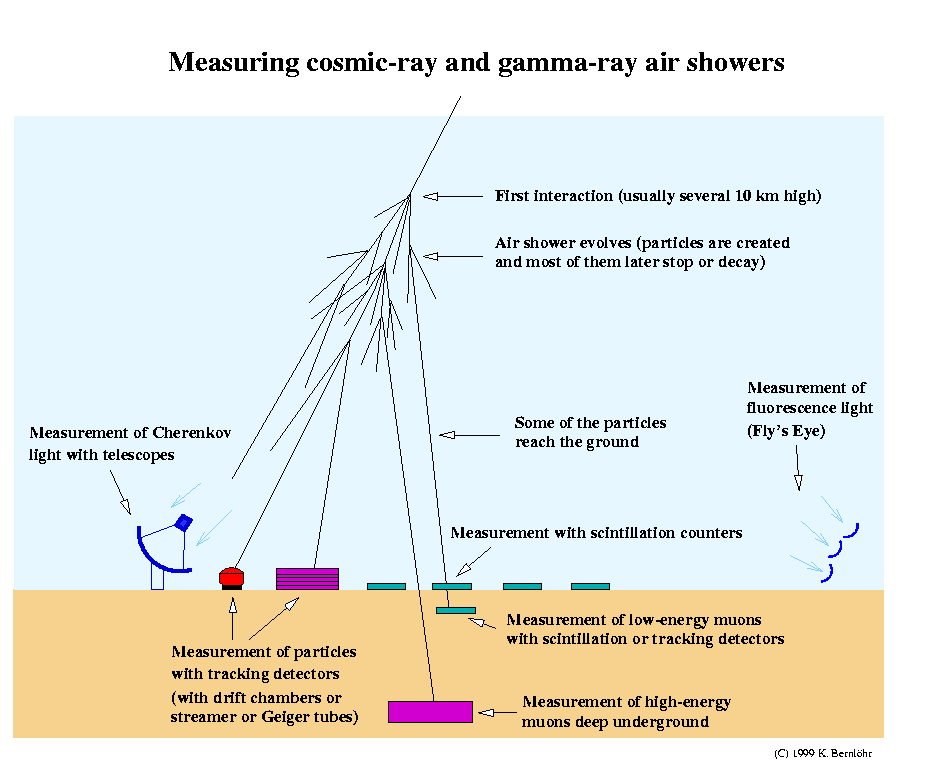
Shower detection

A cosmic-ray observatory is a scientific installation built to detect high-energy-particles coming from space called cosmic rays. This typically includes photons (high-energy light), electrons, protons, and some heavier nuclei, as well as antimatter particles. About 90% of cosmic rays are protons, 9% are alpha particles, and the remaining ~1% are other particles.

It is not yet possible to build image forming optics for cosmic rays, like a Wolter telescope for lower energy X-rays, although some cosmic-ray observatories also look for high energy gamma rays and x-rays. Ultra-high-energy cosmic rays (UHECR) pose further detection problems. One way of learning about cosmic rays is using different detectors to observe aspects of a cosmic ray air shower.

Methods of detection for gamma-rays:

- Scintillation detectors
- Solid state detectors
- Compton scattering
- Pair telescopes
- Air Cherenkov detectors

For example, while a visible light photon may have an energy of a few eV, a cosmic gamma ray may exceed a TeV (1,000,000,000,000 eV). Sometimes cosmic gamma rays (photons) are not grouped with nuclei cosmic rays.

== History ==
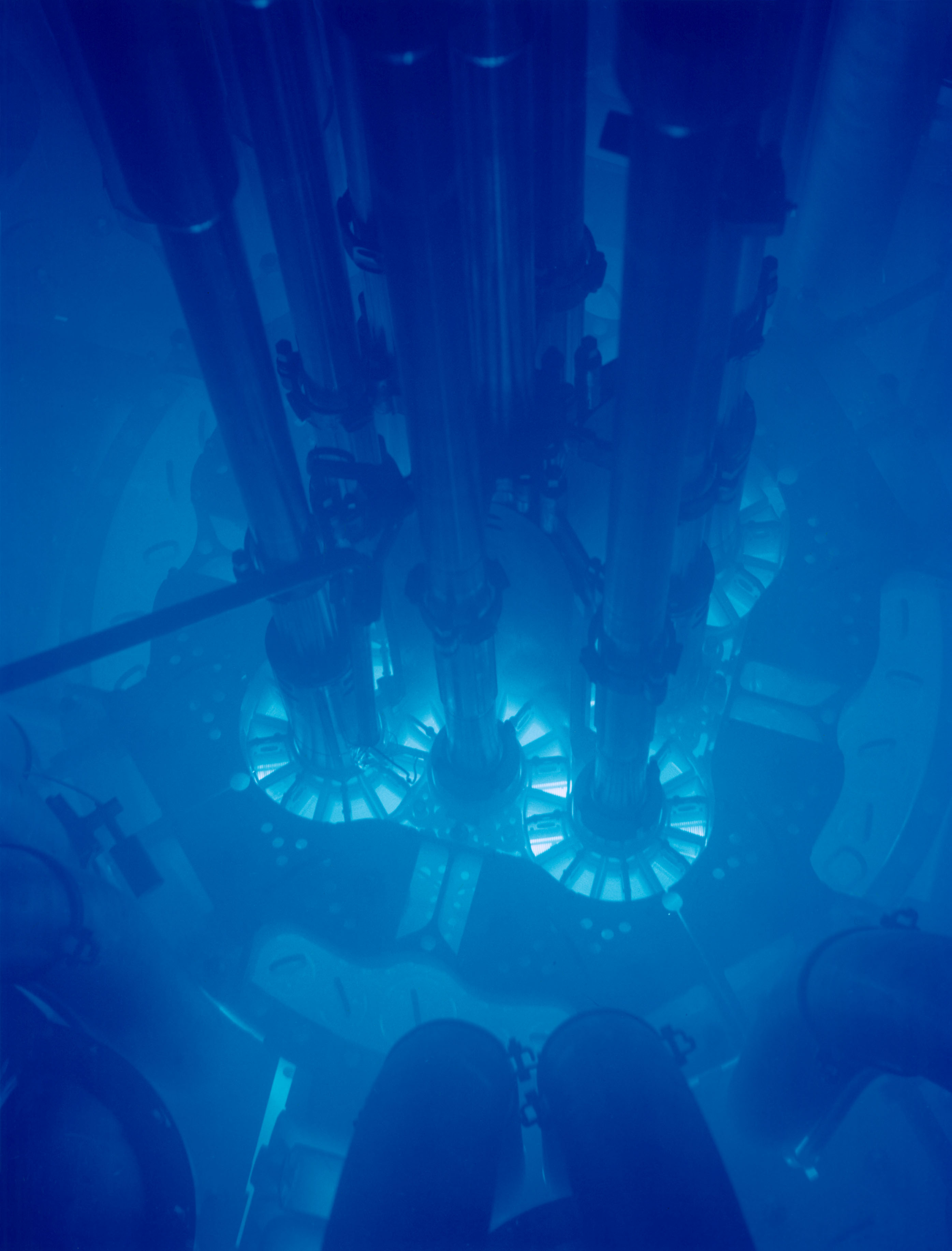
Cherenkov radiation (light) glowing in the core of a nuclear reactor. In comparison to this, the camera has captured a blue light from this effect in the water from the radiation given off by reactor, the cosmic-ray observatories look for this radiation coming from cosmic-rays in Earth's atmosphere

"In 1952, a simple and audacious experiment allowed the first observation of Cherenkov light produced by cosmic rays passing through the atmosphere, giving birth to a new field of astronomy". This work, involving minimal instrument expense (a dustbin, a war-surplus parabolic mirror, and a 5 cm diameter photomultiplier tube), and based on a suggestion by Patrick Blackett, led ultimately to the current international multibillion-dollar investment in gamma ray astronomy.

The Explorer 1 satellite launched in 1958 subsequently measured cosmic rays. Anton 314 omnidirectional Geiger–Müller tube, designed by George H. Ludwig of the State University of Iowa Cosmic Ray Laboratory, detected cosmic rays. It could detect protons with energy over 30 MeV and electrons with energy over 3 MeV. Most of the time the instrument was saturated;

Sometimes the instrumentation would report the expected cosmic ray count (approximately thirty counts per second) but sometimes it would show a peculiar zero counts per second. The University of Iowa (under Van Allen) noted that all of the zero counts per second reports were from an altitude of 2,000+ km (1,250+ miles) over South America, while passes at 500 km (310 mi) would show the expected level of cosmic rays. This is called the South Atlantic Anomaly. Later, after Explorer 3, it was concluded that the original Geiger counter had been overwhelmed ("saturated") by strong radiation coming from a belt of charged particles trapped in space by the Earth's magnetic field. This belt of charged particles is now known as the Van Allen radiation belt.

Cosmic rays were studied aboard the space station Mir in the late 20th century, such as with the SilEye experiment. This studied the relationship between flashes seen by astronauts in space and cosmic rays, the cosmic ray visual phenomena.

In December 1993, the Akeno Giant Air Shower Array in Japan (abbreviated AGASA) recorded one of the highest energy cosmic ray events ever observed.

In October 2003, the Pierre Auger Observatory in Argentina completed construction on its 100th surface detector and became the largest cosmic-ray array in the world. It detects cosmic rays through the use of two different methods: watching Cherenkov radiation made when particles interact with water, and observing ultraviolet light emitted in the Earth's atmosphere. In 2018, the installation of an upgrade called AugerPrime has started adding scintillation and radio detectors to the Observatory.

In 2010, an expanded version of AMANDA named IceCube was completed. IceCube measures Cherenkov light in a cubic kilometer of transparent ice. It is estimated to detect 275 million cosmic rays every day.

Space shuttle Endeavor transported the Alphamagnetic Spectrometer (AMS) to the International Space Station on May 16, 2011. In just over one year of operating, the AMS collected data on 17 billion cosmic-ray events.

== Observatories and experiments ==
There are a number of cosmic ray research initiatives. These include, but are not limited to:

- Ground based
  - ALBORZ Observatory
  - ERGO
  - CHICOS
  - GAMMA
  - KASCADE-(Grande) – KArlsruhe Shower Core and Array DEtector (and its extension called 'Grande')
  - Large High Altitude Air Shower Observatory
  - LOPES – the LOFAR PrototypE Station is the radio extension of KASCADE.
  - TAIGA – Tunka Advanced Instrument for cosmic ray physics and Gamma Astronomy
  - HAWC High Altitude Water Cherenkov
  - High Energy Stereoscopic System
  - High Resolution Fly's Eye Cosmic Ray Detector
  - MAGIC
  - MARIACHI
  - Pierre Auger Observatory
  - Project GRAND
  - Southern Wide-field Gamma-ray Observatory
  - Telescope Array Project
  - WALTA (Washington Large Area Time Coincidence Array)
  - IceTop
  - TACTIC
  - VERITAS
  - Major Atmospheric Cerenkov Experiment Telescope (MACE)
- Satellite based
  - PAMELA
  - Alpha Magnetic Spectrometer
  - Spaceship Earth
  - ACE (Advanced Composition Explorer)
  - Voyager 1's and Voyager 2's Cosmic Ray Subsystem
  - Cassini-Huygens
  - HEAO 1, Einstein Observatory (HEAO2), HEAO 3
  - ISS-CREAM
- Balloon-borne
  - BESS (Balloon-borne Experiment with Superconducting Spectrometer)
  - ATIC (Advanced Thin Ionization Calorimeter)
  - TRACER (cosmic ray detector)
  - BOOMERanG experiment
  - TIGER (Trans-Iron Galactic Element Recorder)
  - Cosmic Ray Energetics and Mass (CREAM)
  - AESOP (Anti-Electron Sub-Orbital Payload)
  - General antiparticle spectrometer (GAPS)

== Ultra high energy cosmic rays ==
Observatories for ultra-high-energy cosmic rays:

- MARIACHI – Mixed Apparatus for Radar Investigation of Cosmic-rays of High Ionization located on Long Island, USA.
- GRAPES-3 (Gamma Ray Astronomy PeV EnergieS 3rd establishment) is a project for cosmic ray study with air shower detector array and large area muon detectors at Ooty in southern India.
- AGASA – Akeno Giant Air Shower Array in Japan
- High Resolution Fly's Eye Cosmic Ray Detector (HiRes)
- Yakutsk Extensive Air Shower Array
- Pierre Auger Observatory
- Extreme Universe Space Observatory
- Telescope Array Project
- Antarctic Impulse Transient Antenna (ANITA) detects ultra-high-energy cosmic neutrinos believed to be caused by ultra-high-energy cosmic rays
- The COSMICi project at Florida A&M University is developing technology for a distributed network of low-cost detectors for UHECR showers in collaboration with MARIACHI.

== See also ==
- CREDO
- Extragalactic cosmic ray
- Gamma-ray telescopes (Alphabetic list)
- Gamma-ray astronomy and X-ray astronomy
- Cosmic Ray System (CR instrument on the Voyagers)
