= Eun-Suk Seo =

Korean American physicist

- Born: 1961^{[1*]}
- Education: Louisiana State University
- Scientific career
- Workplaces: University of Maryland, College Park

Korean name
- Hangul: 서은숙
- Hanja: 徐銀淑
- RR: Seo Eunsuk
- MR: Sŏ Ŭnsuk

Eun-Suk Seo (Korean: 서은숙) is an American astrophysicist known for her observational research on cosmic rays. She is a professor of physics at the University of Maryland, College Park, where she is also affiliated with the Institute for Physical Science and Technology and heads the Cosmic Ray Physics Group.

== Education and career ==
Seo earned her doctorate in 1991 at Louisiana State University, under the joint supervision of William Vernon Jones and John Wefel. She joined the University of Maryland faculty in 1991.

== Research ==
Seo has been a been principal investigator on international astrophysical collaborations including the Cosmic Ray Energetics and Mass Experiment (CREAM) (both in its initial balloon-launched configuration and in its second-generation ISS-CREAM experiment sent aboard the International Space Station in 2017 ), and co-investigator on others such as the Advanced Thin Ionization Calorimeter, Alpha Magnetic Spectrometer, and Balloon-borne Experiment with Superconducting Spectrometer.

In 2019, NASA attempted to replace Seo as principal investigator on ISS-CREAM, and after a majority of the project's scientists supported Seo by rejecting NASA's chosen successor as principal investigator, they discontinued the experiment.

== Service and Recognition ==
In 2010, Seo was elected as a Fellow of the American Physical Society (APS), after a nomination from the APS Division of Astrophysics, "for leading the development and utilization of particle detectors for balloon and space-based experiments to understand cosmic ray origin, acceleration and propagation, especially as Principal Investigator of the Cosmic Ray Energetics And Mass balloon-borne experiment over Antarctica". Furthermore, she has been president of the Korean-American Scientists and Engineers Association, Korean-American Women in Science and Engineering, and Association of Korean Physicists in America. She is the founding president of the Korean-American AeroSpace Science and Technology Association (KASSTA), and a prior U.S. representative for the International Union of Pure and Applied Physics.
