= Astronomical Observatory of the University of the Punjab =

- Organization: Department of Space Science
- Location: Lahore, Punjab, Pakistan
- Coordinates: 31°30′15″N 74°18′23″E
- Established: 1932
- Website: Astronomical Observatory of University of the Punjab

Telescopes
- Astronomical Observatory: Cosmic-ray observatory
- Astronomical Observatory-II: X-ray astronomy

The Astronomical Observatory of the University of the Punjab is an astronomical observatory, located in Lahore, Pakistan. The observatory is based at the Quaid-i-Azam Campus of the University of the Punjab and operated by the university's Department of Space Science.

== History ==
The Observatory was established in the 1930s. From its establishment, the space observatory was operated by the University of the Punjab. The space observatory was constituted under the Department of Space Science during 1985.
