= GAMMA =

Experiment involving cosmic rays

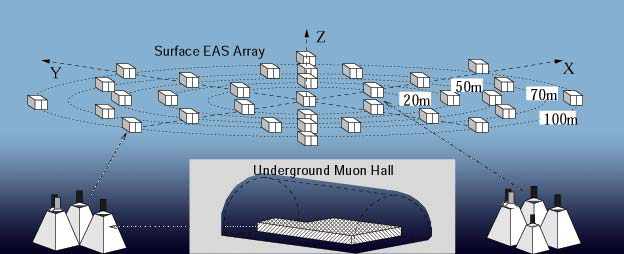
GAMMA Experiment.

The GAMMA experiment is a study of:

- Primary cosmic ray energy spectra and elemental composition (abundances of the elements) at energies 10^{15}–10^{18}eV (so called knee energy region)
- Galactic diffuse gamma-ray intensity at energies 10^{14}–10^{15}eV
- Extensive Air Showers (EAS) at the mountain level by the ground-based EAS array and underground muon scintillation counters
- Hard jets production at energies ~10^{16}eV by the muon multi-core shower events

The GAMMA experiment is deployed on the South side of Mount Aragats in Armenia (Cosmic-ray observatory) and operated by the Cosmic Ray Division of the Yerevan Physics Institute. The facility consists of a ground-based extensive air shower (EAS) array of 33 surface detection stations and 150 underground muon detectors. The elevation of the GAMMA facility is 3200 m above sea level, which corresponds to about 700 g/cm^{2} of atmospheric depth. The surface stations of the EAS array are arranged in 5 concentric circles of 20, 28, 50, 70, and 100 m radii, and each station contains 3 plastic scintillation detectors with the dimensions of 1 m × 1 m × 0.05 m. 9 central detector stations contain an additional small scintillator with dimensions 0.3 m × 0.3 m × 0.05 m for high particle density (much greater than 100 particles/m^{2}) measurements. A photomultiplier tube is placed on the top of the aluminum casing covering each scintillator. One of three detectors of each station is viewed by two photomultipliers, one of which is designed for fast timing measurements. 150 underground muon detectors are compactly arranged in the underground hall under 2.3 kg/cm^{2} of concrete and rock providing the detection of shower muons with energy greater than 5 GeV.

The results of GAMMA experiment for 2004–2010 runs are presented in references below .
