= PERDaix =

PERDaix (Proton Electron Radiation Detector Aix-la-Chapelle) is a novel, small and light weight magnetic spectrometer to measure the charge and mass dependent solar modulation periodically for deeper understanding of cosmic rays. For a better understanding of sources and acceleration of cosmic particles direct measurements of cosmic rays are necessary. Also for a better understanding of the solar modulation which is expected to follow the 22-year solar cycle, time dependent measurements are needed. PERDaix is a newly designed detector which is constructed by the Department of Physics 1b, RWTH Aachen University. Being proposed to the German Space Agency in November 2009 for a participation in the BEXUS Program (Rocket and Balloon Experiments for University Students) after a first canceled flight attempt in October 2010 the actual flight took place as a post-BEXUS-campaign flight opportunity in November 2010.

The detector is able to measure charged particles in the energy range of 0.5 GeV to 5 GeV. PERDaix uses a time of flight system, a scintillating fiber tracker with silicon photomultiplier (SiPM) readout, and a transition radiation detector in combination with a permanent magnet to measure particle fluxes. The BEXUS balloons are launched at Esrange Space Center near Kiruna, Sweden. In November 2010 PERDaix reached a top altitude of 33.3 km at which it kept floating for 1.5 hours.

== Sub-detectors ==
=== Time of flight system ===
The time of flight system (TOF) is the upper- and lowermost layer of the detector. It consists of scintillators with an SiPM readout. It is used as a trigger signal and to discriminate against particles entering the detector from below. With a design time resolution of approximately 300 picoseconds (ps) it can be used to distinguish between positrons and electrons in the momentum range below 1 GeV. Protons can be distinguished from positrons for momenta below 1 GeV if their velocity is lower than β = 1.

=== Tracker ===
Perdaix will make use of a scintillating fiber tracking detector made up from 250 μm thin scintillating polystyrene fibers that emit light when traversed by a charged particle. The scintillating fibers are read out by silicon photomultiplier (SiPM) arrays which are structured semi-conductor photon detectors that offer high photon efficiencies of 50%, a high gain of 10^6 electrons / photon and that are very compact in size. One silicon photomultiplier array is 1.1mm by 8.0mm in size and has 32 channels. Twenty 32mm wide and 300mm long fiber modules are arranged in four layers around a hollow cylindrical permanent magnet array.

=== Magnet ===
The permanent magnet array is constructed as a Halbach-Ring and weighs 8 kg and produces a very high magnetic field of ~0.26 tesla (T) inside an 80mm high and 213mm diameter magnet cylinder while producing only a negligible magnetic field outside the cylinder.

=== Transition radiation detector ===
Underneath the lowest tracker layer a transition radiation detector (TRD) is installed. The TRD detects transition radiation of relativistic particles with a Lorentz factor γ exceeding ≈ 1000. Particles crossing the interface of two media with different dielectric constant produce transition radiation. The energy loss at a boundary is proportional to the relativistic gamma factor. A significant amount of TR is produced for a gamma greater than 1000. The gamma factor of protons is, up to a momentum of 5GeV, still in the order of 10, whereas the positron's gamma is greater than 1000, starting at 0.5GeV momentum.

The detector is made up of 256 6mm thick straw tubes out of a 72 um thin multilayer aluminium-kapton foil, filled with an 80/20 mixture of xenon (Xe) and carbon dioxide (CO_{2}). It is used to measure the x-ray transition radiation produced by electrons in eight 20mm thick layers of an irregular fleece radiator. This leads to more than 100 material interfaces per radiator layer.

== Launch in November 2010 ==
Due to strong winds the launch campaign in October 2010 had to be canceled without a BEXUS-11 flight at first. Thanks to the support of German Space Agency (DLR) and Esrange a second flight opportunity was provided in late November 2010. On 23 November a 100 000 m³ helium balloon was launched from Esrange carrying a payload of 334 kg containing the BEXUS student experiments including the PERDaix detector.
