= CHICOS =

Cosmic ray observatory program

Coordinates: 34°8′20.32″N 118°7′31.96″W

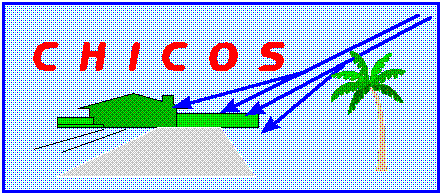
CHICOS logo

The California High School Cosmic Ray Observatory, (abbreviated CHICOS, for California HIgh school Cosmic ray ObServatory), operated by the Kellogg Laboratory at the California Institute of Technology in Pasadena, California, United States, is an ongoing Cosmic Ray observatory program. It is known for its large network within the Los Angeles County area, based mainly on high school sites carrying cosmic ray detector units, though there are also detector units on associated elementary schools and middle schools.

== Mission ==
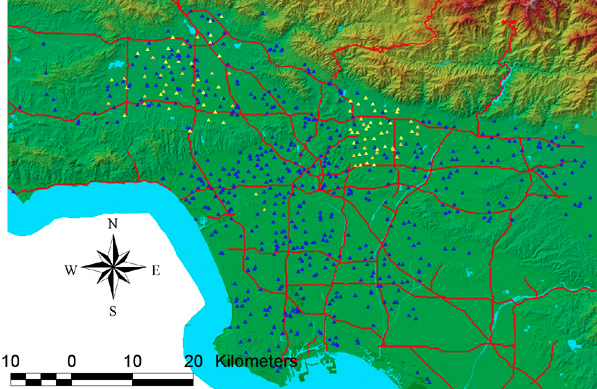
Yellow and orange triangles are in operation. Blue triangles indicate the potential for future expansion.

The CHICOS project blends scientific research with broadly-based educational outreach. CHICOS is an active research array for the detection of Ultra-high-energy cosmic rays. The array as presently deployed has already seen extended air showers, and the soon-to-be-completed CHICOS 90 array will observe with large aperture in the energy range from 10^{18} to 10^{21} eV, with the angular resolution to address questions of clustering in several years of run time. The events CHICOS is designed to observe are single subatomic particles slamming into the Earth's atmosphere with the energy of a brick falling from a rooftop. These Ultra-high-energy cosmic rays, or UHECRs, interact with the atmosphere to produce large showers of secondary particles at the surface of the Earth. Detection of UHECRs therefore depends on an array of particle sensors deployed like a net over many square kilometers to catch the incoming shower. In the CHICOS project, schools across the Los Angeles area provide the "net" of detector sites with ready-made infrastructure and a valuable population of teachers and students who participate in the project.

=== Shmoos (Cosmic Ray Detector Units) ===
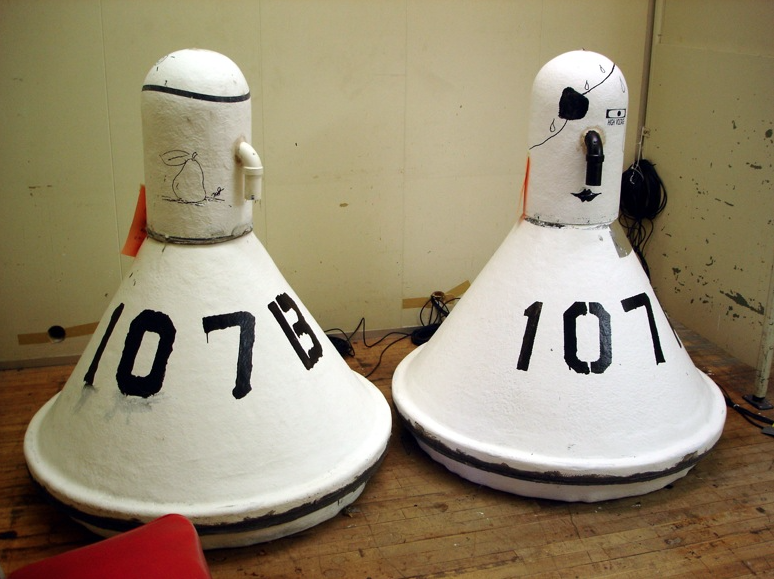
Shmoos (The Cosmic Ray Detectors Unit)

The detectors used in the CHICOS program are specially called "Shmoos" because of their similarity in shape to the cartoon character Shmoo. Each school site generally has two of these Shmoos set on their campus, to help gather accurate particle shower data.

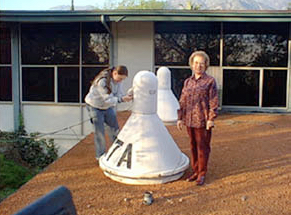
CHICOS school site

The Shmoos are the most important part of the CHICOS project, and their setup requires accurate measurements and careful construction from the inside-out. Shmoos are generally set up at the Kellogg Radiation Laboratory and sent to schools. High school students have the chance to participate in the assembly process. Once the Shmoos are installed, the on-site teachers and students assist with their repair and maintenance. At a school site, Shmoos are generally put not too far from each other, with the two Shmoos connected via cables to the associated computer provided with the detectors.

== Future ==
CHICOS has a data collection system that is recording all the large cosmic ray showers that fall within the array. The information that is collected from the Cosmic Ray detectors from different schools are combined to reconstruct cosmic ray events. These events are analyzed to create histograms of cosmic ray incidents, including a sky-map that would indicate the spread of cosmic rays directions from outer space, with each shower that is recorded indicating a cosmic event. The goal of CHICOS is to be able to trace these cosmic rays back to their source, and understand what it exactly is that produces UHECRs. This quest remains one of the top eleven unsolved mysteries in physics today. In the future, more schools in the Los Angeles area are joining this program, more data will be collected and a more complete sky-map will be graphed. More detailed studies of CHICOS data and matches with astronomical research will provide progress toward a better understand of the nature cosmic rays and the universe.

== Sponsorship ==
IBM donated a significant fraction of the computers used in data collection at each site. Ongoing operational expenses of the project are provided by the National Science Foundation. CHICOS actively seeks additional grants, both public and private, to enable expansion and better educational support as described above.

== See also ==
- List of astronomical observatories
- UHECR
