= Spaceship Earth (detector) =

Spaceship Earth is a network of neutron monitors designed to measure the flux of cosmic rays arriving at Earth from different directions. All the 12 member neutron monitor stations are located at high (Northern or Southern) latitude, which makes their detecting directions more precise, and their energy responses uniform. Their combined signals provide a real-time measurement of the three-dimensional distribution of cosmic rays, mainly galactic cosmic rays as well as solar energetic particles during the most intense solar events. Analyses of these data have applications in space weather studies.

== Locations ==
Spaceship Earth is a multinational collaboration, with participating institutions from the United States of America, Russia, Canada, and Australia.

- The Bartol Research Institute at the University of Delaware, U.S.A., operates the stations at McMurdo (Antarctica), Thule (Greenland), Inuvik (Northwest Territories, Canada), Fort Smith (Northwest Territories, Canada), Peawanuck (Ontario, Canada), and Nain (Labrador, Canada).
- IZMIRAN and the Polar Geophysical Institute, Russia, operate the Russian stations of Apatity, Barentsburg, Cape Schmidt, Norilsk, and Tixie Bay.
- The Australian Antarctic Division, Australia, operates the station at Mawson (Antarctica).
