= Cosmic-Ray Extremely Distributed Observatory =

Science project

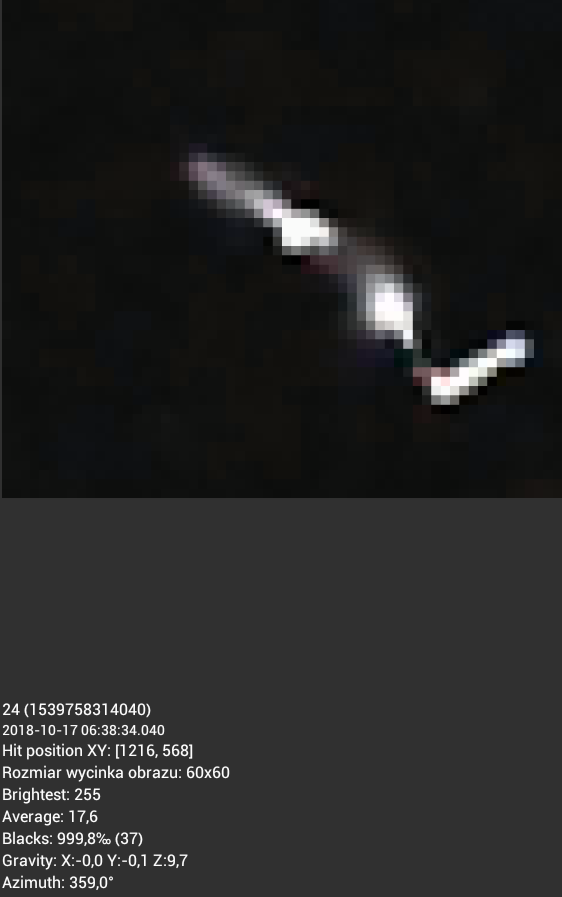
Particle registered by CREDO detector

Cosmic-Ray Extremely Distributed Observatory (CREDO) is a scientific project initiated at the end of August 2016 by Polish scientists from the Institute of Nuclear Physics in Kraków (researchers from the Czech Republic, Slovakia and Hungary also joined the project) whose purpose is the detection of cosmic rays and the search for dark matter. Its aim is to involve as many people as possible in the construction of a global system of cosmic ray detectors, from which it will be possible to examine the essence of dark matter. Having a camera and a GPS module, a smartphone works well as a detector of particles from space.

== Objective ==
The main objective of CREDO is the detection and analysis of extended cosmic ray phenomena, so-called super-preshowers (SPS), using existing as well as new infrastructure (cosmic-ray observatories, educational detectors, single detectors etc.). The search for ensembles of cosmic ray events initiated by SPS is yet an untouched topic, in contrast to the current state-of-the-art analysis, which is focused on the detection of single cosmic ray events. Theoretical explanation of SPS could be given either within classical (e.g., photon-photon interaction) or exotic (e.g., Super Heavy Dark Matter decay or annihilation) scenarios, thus detection of SPS would provide a better understanding of particle physics, high energy astrophysics and cosmology.

The ensembles of cosmic rays can be classified based on the spatial and temporal extent of particles constituting the ensemble. Some classes of SPS are predicted to have huge spatial distribution, a unique signature detectable only with a facility of global size. Since development and commissioning of a completely new facility with such requirements is economically unwarranted and time-consuming, the global analysis goals are achievable when all types of existing detectors are merged into a worldwide network.

The idea to use the instruments in operation is based on a novel trigger algorithm: in parallel to looking for neighbour surface detectors receiving the signal simultaneously, one should also look for spatially isolated stations clustered in a small time window. On the other hand, CREDO's strategy is also aimed at an active engagement of a large number of participants, who will contribute to the project by using common electronic devices (e.g. smartphones), capable of detecting cosmic rays. It will help not only in expanding the geographical spread of CREDO, but also in managing a large manpower necessary for a more efficient crowd-sourced pattern recognition scheme to identify and classify SPS.

A worldwide network of cosmic-ray detectors could not only become a unique tool to study fundamental physics, it will also provide a number of other opportunities, including space weather or geophysics studies. Among the latter, one can list the potential to predict earthquakes by monitoring the rate of low energy cosmic-ray events. This diversity of potential applications has motivated the researchers to advertise the concept across the astroparticle physics community.

== Implementation ==
The user must install an application that turns their phone into a cosmic ray detector, connect it to the charger and arrange it horizontally; for example, put it on a table or bedside cabinet. It is also important that the cameras of the device are well covered, for example with a piece of black adhesive tape, and notifications indicated by the blinking of lights are turned off. If a radiation particle passes through a photosensitive matrix in the phone, it will stimulate several pixels, which will be noticed by the program that sends information to the server. Thanks to the GPS module, the time and place of the event is also known.

All data from smartphones will then be analyzed together in the Academic Computer Center Cyfronet AGH, which will keep participants informed about the progress of the search for signs of high-energy particles.

By 2020 the application is still under testing and may not produce the expected results on some mobile devices.

== Preview of collected data ==
All traces of particles registered by smartphones can be viewed on a dedicated website. Their size and shape depends on the type and energy of the captured particle and the direction from which it came.

Statistics
Detections	Users	Teams	Date
10,695,152	13831	11096	2021 - 05
