= Washington Large Area Time Coincidence Array =

The Washington Area Large-scale Time-coincidence Array (WALTA) is a cosmic ray physics experiment run by the University of Washington to investigate ultra high energy cosmic rays (>10^{19}eV). The program uses detectors placed at Seattle-area high schools and colleges which are linked via the internet, effectively forming an Extensive Air Shower array. In addition to working on the unexplained levels of Ultra High Energy cosmic ray (UHECR) flux, it hopes to serve as a pedagogical tool for increasing the physics involvement of high schools and community colleges with a University level physics experiment. Each site has three to four scintillation detectors with the goal of having enough sites to cover a 200 km^{2} area around the city of Seattle. WALTA is a part of the larger NALTA project which hopes to combine data from several WALTA like projects to further the exploration of UHE cosmic rays.

== Background ==
=== Cosmic rays ===
Cosmic rays are high energy particles that bombard the Earth's atmosphere. About 89% of these are protons. The flux of cosmic rays is approximately proportional to 1/(E^{a}) where E is the energy and a is somewhere between 2 and 3 up to the UHECR limit. Cosmic rays created in our galaxy with energy of less than about 10^{18}eV get trapped by the galaxy's magnetic field. Particles above that should escape, so high energy cosmic rays would likely come from outside our galaxy. According to the Greisen, Zatsepin, Kuzmin (GZK) cutoff, inter-galactic cosmic rays above 10^{20}eV should be absorbed by the Cosmic microwave background radiation due to pion production and pair production. In pion production, the protons (UHECRs) above 10^{20}eV have enough energy to interact with the CMBR to create pions, and above 10^{17}eV have enough energy to interact with the electron-positron pairs from pair production. These interactions would cause extra-galactic UHECRs to lose too much energy to reach the earth. Physicists have observed cosmic rays with energies at this level since 1963 Some cosmic ray experiments claim that they have seen UHECR levels in excess of the GZK prediction, while others claim to detect levels about equivalent to the prediction Such conflicting experiments are the motivation for further study of UHECRs and therefore experiments like WALTA.

=== Detection at the Earth's surface ===
Cosmic rays that hit the Earth's atmosphere do not tend to make it to the Earth's surface as protons. Instead, they interact with the nuclei of atmospheric particles and cause a cascade of particles, known as an air shower. The number of resulting particles is indicative of the cosmic ray's energy, and the details of particle types and distributions indicate the type of cosmic rays (proton, gamma ray, etc.). The front of the air shower from UHE cosmic rays can cover several square kilometers and therefore would take either a really large detector or several detectors spread out. These detectors would need to communicate together or with a central source that could determine when they were detecting showers from the same event. WALTA is placing several scintillators at local Seattle schools, thereby covering the necessary area to record UHECR events.

== WALTA setup ==
The goal of WALTA is to set up detectors at least 32 sites in the Seattle area, covering an area of 200 square kilometers. This area would be large enough to detect events above the GZK cutoff. The program hopes to fill in gaps in this area as the project matures. Each location has four scintillation detectors which emit light when hit by charged particles. Each paddle detectors is about an inch thick and covers approximately one square meter. Each site would ideally put the detectors in a star formation with one detector in the middle and three surrounding it on a circle of 10m^{2} radius. With this geometry, each site could detect 10^{15}eV events. Each site will attempt this layout as best possible given the site's own geography. Each detector has a photomultiplier tube which multiplies the emitted light into a large electrical signal. The signal from each detector paddle goes into a data acquisition card (DAQ) which is set to record an event based on a certain coincidence. The DAQ card also has a GPS input. The output of this card connects to a computer using a serial port and software counts the data with a GPS location and time stamp. A site can upload the data to the WALTA server and data can be compared to see if events happen from the same shower. The timing of events and the area covered tells the energy and location where the cosmic ray hit the Earth's atmosphere.

== Motivations for WALTA ==
Experiments such as AGASA show a higher number of UHECRs than expected per the GZK cutoff while other experiments such as the Pierre Auguer Collaboration claim that the spectrum of UHECRs fit the falloff predicted by GZK. UHECRs, based on GZK, would have to originate within 100 Mpc of our galaxy, but would be able to escape the galaxy's 3 micro-gauss magnetic field. There is also no known galactic source of UHECRs. It is possible that they are from outside the galaxy and unknown physics allows them to overcome the GZK theory, or they are from some unknown galactic source. There are also suggestions that they originate from matter and are in an intergalactic magnetic field Larmor radius, or that they relate to compact radio quasars. These experiments motivate further investigation into UHECRs leading to a larger set of data. WALTA intends to cover a large portion of the Seattle area, and will coordinate with the larger NALTA covering several North American sites.
