= Cosmic ray visual phenomena =

Cosmic ray visual phenomena, or light flashes (LF), also known as Astronaut's Eye, are spontaneous flashes of light visually perceived by some astronauts outside the magnetosphere of the Earth, such as during the Apollo program. While LF may be the result of actual photons of visible light being sensed by the retina, the LF discussed here could also pertain to phosphenes, which are sensations of light produced by the activation of neurons along the visual pathway.

== Possible causes ==
Researchers believe that the LF perceived specifically by astronauts in space are due to cosmic rays (high-energy charged particles from beyond the Earth's atmosphere), though the exact mechanism is unknown. Hypotheses include Cherenkov radiation created as the cosmic ray particles pass through the vitreous humour of the astronauts' eyes, direct interaction with the optic nerve, direct interaction with visual centres in the brain, retinal receptor stimulation, and a more general interaction of the retina with radiation.

== Conditions under which the light flashes were reported ==
Astronauts who had recently returned from space missions to the Hubble Space Telescope, the International Space Station and Mir Space Station reported seeing the LF under different conditions. In order of decreasing frequency of reporting in a survey, they saw the LF in the dark, in dim light, in bright light and one reported that he saw them regardless of light level and light adaptation. They were seen mainly before sleeping.

== Types ==
Some LF were reported to be clearly visible, while others were not. They manifested in different colors and shapes. How often each type was seen varied across astronauts' experiences, as evident in a survey of 59 astronauts.

=== Colors ===
On Lunar missions, astronauts almost always reported that the flashes were white, with one exception where the astronaut observed "blue with a white cast, like a blue diamond." On other space missions, astronauts reported seeing other colors such as yellow and pale green, though rarely. Others instead reported that the flashes were predominantly yellow, while others reported colors such as orange and red, in addition to the most common colors of white and blue.

=== Shapes ===
The main shapes seen are "spots" (or "dots"), "stars" (or "supernovas"), "streaks" (or "stripes"), "blobs" (or "clouds") and "comets". These shapes were seen at varying frequencies across astronauts. On the Moon flights, astronauts reported seeing the "spots" and "stars" 66% of the time, "streaks" 25% of the time, and "clouds" 8% of the time. Astronauts who went on other missions reported mainly "elongated shapes". About 40% of those surveyed reported a "stripe" or "stripes" and about 20% reported a "comet" or "comets". 17% of the reports mentioned a "single dot" and only a handful mentioned "several dots", "blobs" and a "supernova".

== Motion ==
A reporting of motion of the LF was common among astronauts who experienced the flashes. For example, Jerry Linenger reported that during a solar storm, they were directional and that they interfered with sleep since closing his eyes would not help. Linenger tried shielding himself behind the station's lead-filled batteries, but this was only partly effective.

The different types of directions that the LF have been reported to move in vary across reports. Some reported that the LF travel across the visual field, moving from the periphery of the visual field to where the person is fixating, while a couple of others reported motion in the opposite direction. Terms that have been used to describe the directions are "sideways", "diagonal", "in-out" and "random". In Fuglesang et al. (2006), it was pointed out that there were no reports of vertical motion.

== Occurrences and frequencies ==
There appear to be individual differences across astronauts in terms of whether they reported seeing the LF or not. While these LF were reported by many astronauts, not all astronauts have experienced them on their space missions, even if they have gone on multiple missions. For those who did report seeing these LF, how often they saw them varied across reports. On the Apollo 15 mission all three astronauts recorded the same LF, which James Irwin described as "a brilliant streak across the retina".

=== Frequency during missions ===
On Lunar missions, once their eyes became adapted to the dark, Apollo astronauts reported seeing this phenomenon once every 2.9 minutes on average.

On other space missions, astronauts reported perceiving the LF once every 6.8 minutes on average. The LF were reported to be seen primarily before the astronauts slept and in some cases disrupted sleep, as in the case of Linenger. Some astronauts pointed out that the LF were seemingly perceived more frequently as long as they were perceived at least once before and attention was directed to the perception of them. One astronaut, on his first flight, only took note of the LF after being told to look out for them. These reports are not surprising considering that the LF may not stand out clearly from the background.

=== Fluctuations during and across missions ===
Apollo astronauts reported that they observed the phenomenon more frequently during the transit to the Moon than during the return transit to Earth. Avdeev et al. (2002) suggested that this might be due to a decrease in sensitivity to the LF over time while in space. Astronauts on other missions reported a change in the rate of occurrence and intensity of the LF during the course of a mission. While some noted that the rate and intensity increased, others noted a decrease. These changes were said to take place during the first days of a mission. Other astronauts have reported changes in the rate of occurrence of the LF across missions, instead of during a mission. For example, Avdeev himself was on Mir for six months during one mission, six months during the second mission a few years later and twelve months during a third mission a couple of years after. He reported that the LF were seen less frequently with each subsequent flight.

Orbital altitude and inclination have also correlated positively with rate of occurrence of the LF. Fuglesang et al. (2006) have suggested that this trend could be due to the increasing particles fluxes at increasing altitudes and inclinations.

== Experiments ==
=== ALFMED experiment ===
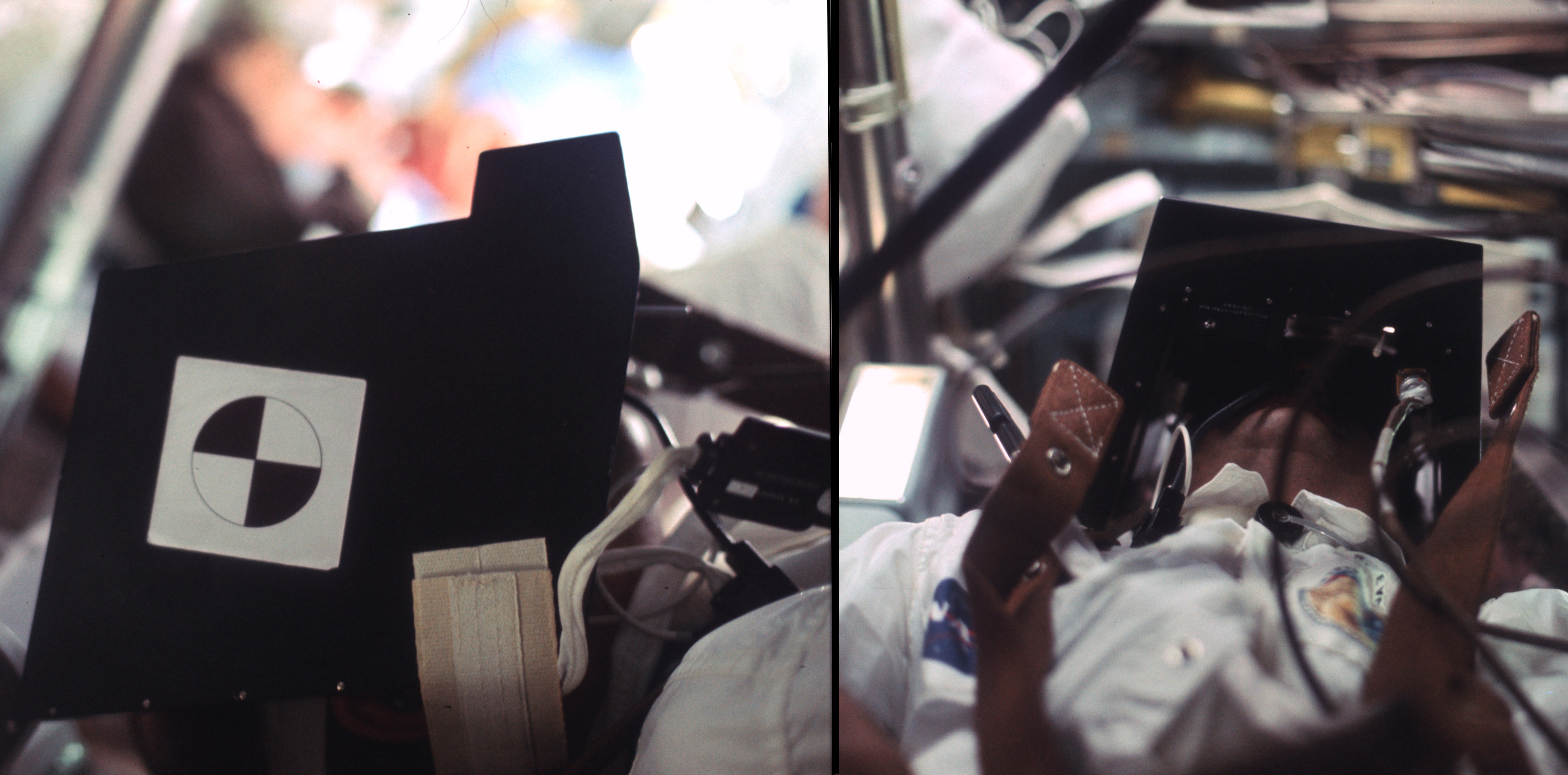
Apollo 17 astronaut Ron Evans wearing the ALFMED light-flash detector during the outbound flight from Earth

During the Apollo 16 and Apollo 17 transits, astronauts conducted the Apollo Light Flash Moving Emulsion Detector (ALFMED) experiment where an astronaut wore a helmet designed to capture the tracks of cosmic ray particles to determine if they coincided with the visual observation. Examination of the results showed that two of fifteen tracks coincided with observation of the flashes. These results in combination with considerations for geometry and Monte Carlo estimations led researchers to conclude that the visual phenomena were indeed caused by cosmic rays.

=== SilEye-Alteino and ALTEA projects ===
The SilEye-Alteino and Anomalous Long Term Effects in Astronauts' Central Nervous System (ALTEA) projects have investigated the phenomenon aboard the International Space Station, using helmets similar in nature to those in the ALFMED experiment. The SilEye project has also examined the phenomenon on Mir. The purpose of this study was to examine the particle tracks entering the eyes of the astronauts when the astronaut said they observed a LF. In examining the particles, the researchers hoped to gain a deeper understanding of what particles might be causing the LF. Astronauts wore the SilEye detector over numerous sessions while on Mir. During those sessions, when they detected a LF, they pressed a button on a joystick. After each session, they recorded down their comments about the experience. Particle tracks that hit the eye during the time when the astronauts indicated that they detected a LF would have had to pass through silicon layers, which were built to detect protons and nuclei and distinguish between them.

The findings show that "a continuous line" and "a line with gaps" was seen a majority of the time. With less frequency, a "shapeless spot", a "spot with a bright nucleus" and "concentric circles" were also reported. The data collected also suggested to the researchers that one's sensitivity to the LF tends to decrease during the first couple of weeks of a mission. With regards to the probable cause of the LF, the researchers concluded that nuclei are likely to be the main cause. They based this conclusion off of the finding that in comparison to an "All time" period, an "In LF time window" period saw the nucleus rate increase to about six to seven times larger, while the proton rate only increased by twice the amount when comparing the two time periods. Hence, the researchers ruled out the Cherenkov effect as a probable cause of the LF observed in space, at least in this case.

=== Ground experiments in the 1970s ===
Experiments conducted in the 1970s also studied the phenomenon. These experiments revealed that although several explanations for why the LF were observed by astronauts have been proposed, there may be other causes as well. Charman et al. (1971) asked whether the LF were the result of single cosmic-ray nuclei entering the eye and directly exciting the eyes of the astronauts, as opposed to the result of Cherenkov radiation within the retina. The researchers had observers view a neutron beam, composed of either 3 or 14 MeV monoenergetic neutrons, in several orientations, relative to their heads. The composition of these beams ensured that particles generated in the eye were below 500 MeV, which was considered the Cherenkov threshold, thereby allowing the researchers to separate one cause of the LF from the other. Observers viewed the neutron beam after being completely dark-adapted.

The 3 MeV neutron beam produced no reporting of LF whether it was exposed to the observers through the front exposure of one eye or through the back of the head. With the 14 MeV neutron beam, however, LF were reported. Lasting for short periods of time, "streaks" were reported when the beam entered one eye from the front. The "streaks" seen had varying lengths (a maximum of 2 degrees of visual angle), and were seen to either have a blueish-white color or be colorless. All but one observer reported seeing fainter but a higher number of "points" or short lines in the center of visual field. When the beam entered both eyes in a lateral orientation, the number of streaks reported increased. The orientation of the streaks corresponded to the orientation of the beam entering the eye. Unlike in the previous case, the streaks seen were more abundant in the periphery than the center of visual field. Lastly, when the beam entered the back of the head, only one person reported seeing the LF. From these results, the researchers concluded that at least for the LF seen in this case, the flashes could not be due to Cherenkov radiation effects in the eye itself (although they did not rule out the possibility that the Cherenkov radiation explanation was applicable to the case of the astronauts). They also suggested that because the number of LF observed decreased significantly when the beam entered the back of the head, the LF were likely not caused by the visual cortex being directly stimulated as this decrease suggested that the beam was weakened as it passed through the skull and brain before reaching the retina. The most probable explanation proposed was that the LF were a result of the receptors on the retina being directly stimulated and "turned on" by a particle in the beam.

In another experiment, Tobias et al. (1971) exposed two people to a beam composed of neutrons ranging from 20 to 640 MeV after they were fully dark-adapted. One observer, who was given four exposures ranging in duration from one to 3.5 seconds, observed "pinpoint" flashes. The observer described them as being similar to "luminous balls seen in fireworks, with initial tails fuzzy and heads like tiny stars". The other observer who was given one exposure lasting three seconds long, reported seeing 25 to 50 "bright discrete light, he described as stars, blue-white in color, coming towards him".

Based on these results, the researchers, like in Charman et al. (1971), concluded that while the Cherenkov effect may be the plausible explanation for the LF experienced by astronauts, in this case, that effect cannot explain the LF seen by the observers. It is possible that the LF observed were the result of interaction of the retina with radiation. They also suggested that the tracks seen may point to tracks that are within the retina itself, with the earlier portions of the streak or track fading as it moves.

Considering the experiments conducted, at least in some cases the LF observed appear to be caused by activation of neurons along the visual pathway, resulting in phosphenes. However, because the researchers cannot definitively rule out the Cherenkov radiation effects as a probable cause of the LF experienced by astronauts, it seems likely that some LF may be the result of Cherenkov radiation effects in the eye itself, instead. The Cherenkov effect can cause Cherenkov light to be emitted in the vitreous body of the eye and thus allow the person to perceive the LF. Hence, it appears that the LF perceived by astronauts in space have different causes. Some may be the result of actual light stimulating the retina, while others may be the result of activity that occurs in neurons along the visual pathway, producing phosphenes.

== See also ==
- Anatoli Bugorski – Soviet and Russian scientist (born 1942)
- Microwave auditory effect – Concept in human perception of sound
