= KASCADE =

Physics experiment to study cosmic rays

Coordinates: 49°05′57.8″N 8°26′14.7″E

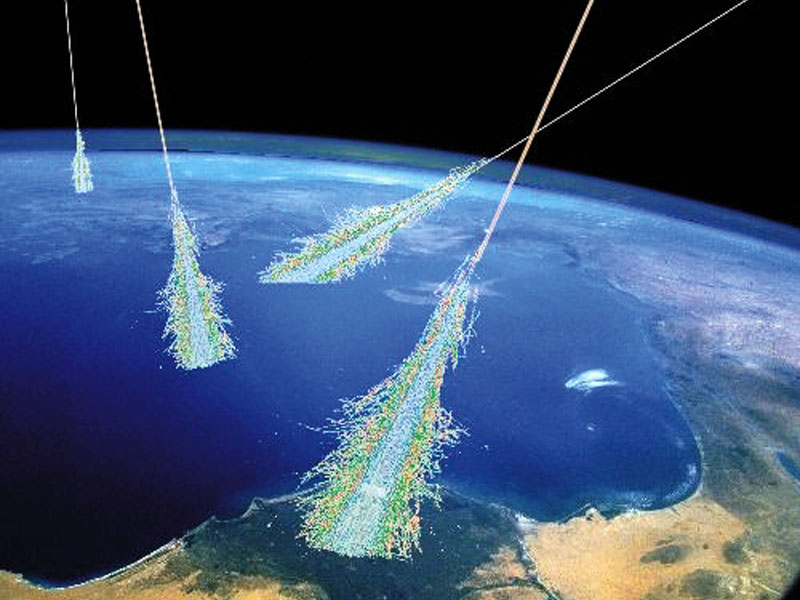
A drawing of ultra-high-energy cosmic rays

KASCADE was a European physics experiment started in 1996 at Forschungszentrum Karlsruhe, Germany (now Karlsruhe Institute of Technology), an extensive air shower experiment array to study the cosmic ray primary composition and the hadronic interactions, measuring simultaneously the electronic, muonic and hadronic components.

KASCADE-Grande was a further extension of the previous project by reassembling 37 detectors of the former EAS-TOP experiment running between 1987 and 2000 at Campo Imperatore, Gran Sasso Laboratories, Italy. By this Grande extension of KASCADE the energy range was extended to 10^{14}–10^{18} eV.

The experiment contributed significantly to the development of the CORSIKA simulation program which is use heavily in astroparticle physics. Co-located with KASCADE-Grande is the LOPES experiment. LOPES consists of radio antennas and measures the radio emission of extensive air showers.

KASCADE (including all extensions) stopped operation in 2013, but a part of the detectors is still used in other experiments for cosmic-ray air showers, e.g., LOFAR or Tunka.

The data acquired by KASCADE-Grande has meanwhile been made accessible to the public in the KASCADE Cosmic-Ray Data Center (KCDC).

== Results ==
KASCADE studied heavier components of cosmic rays, finding a "knee" near 80 PeV in 2011, and extending the spectrum measurements to 200PeV.

Later, a knee-like feature in the heavy component and an ankle-like feature in the light component of cosmic rays was discovered at an energy of about 10^{17} eV.

== Participants ==
- Institut für Kernphysik and Institut für Experimentelle Kernphysik, Karlsruhe Institute of Technology, Karlsruhe, Germany
- Dipartimento di Fisica Generale dell' Università and Istituto di Fisica dello Spazio Interplanetario, National Institute for Astrophysics, Turin, Italy
- University of Siegen, Siegen, Germany
- University of Wuppertal, Wuppertal, Germany
- Soltan Institute for Nuclear Studies, Łódź, Poland
- Institute of Physics and Nuclear Engineering, Bucharest, Romania
