= GRAPES-3 =

The GRAPES-3 experiment
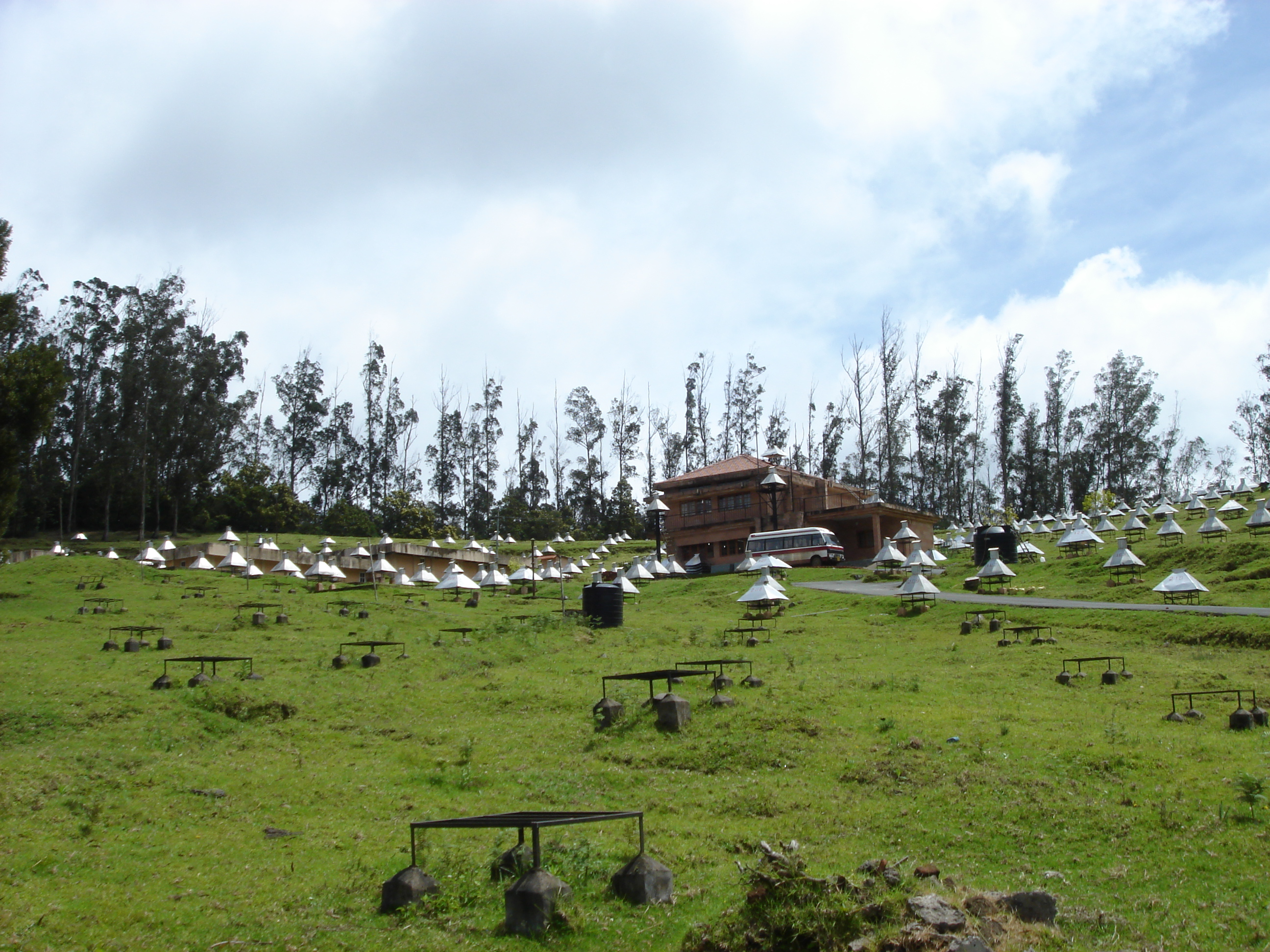
- GRAPES-3 Air Shower Array
- Location: Ooty, India
- Participants: Tata Institute of Fundamental Research, Osaka City University, Nagoya Women's University.
- Duration: 1955 –
- Website: www.tifr.res.in/grapes3/

The GRAPES-3 experiment (or Gamma Ray Astronomy PeV EnergieS phase-3) located at Ooty in India started as a collaboration of the Indian Tata Institute of Fundamental Research and the Japanese Osaka City University, and now also includes the Japanese Nagoya Women's University.

GRAPES-3 is designed to study cosmic rays with an array of air shower detectors and a large area muon detector. It aims to probe acceleration of cosmic rays in the following four astrophysical settings. These include acceleration of particles to, (i) ~100 MeV in atmospheric electric fields through muons, (ii) ~10 GeV in the Solar System through muons, (iii) ~1 PeV in our galaxy, (iv) ~100 EeV in the nearby universe through measurement of diffuse gamma ray flux.

The GRAPES-3 is located at N11.4^{o}, E76.7^{o}, 2200m above mean sea level. The observations began with 217 plastic scintillators and a 560 m^{2} area muon detector in 2000. The scintillators detect charged particles contained in extensive air showers produced by interaction of high energy cosmic rays in the atmosphere. At present the array is operating with ~400 scintillators that are spread over an area of 25,000 m^{2}. The energy threshold of muon detectors is 1 GeV.

== Objectives ==
Study of

1. The origin, acceleration and propagation of >10^{14} eV cosmic rays in the galaxy and beyond.
2. Existence of "Knee" in the energy spectrum of cosmic rays.
3. Production and/or acceleration of highest energy (~10^{20} eV) cosmic rays in the universe.
4. Astronomy of multi-TeV γ-rays from neutron stars and other compact object.
5. Sun the closest astrophysical object, accelerator of energetic particles and its effects on the Earth.

== Overview ==
The first cosmic ray experiment was started in 1955 by B. V. Sreekantan by setting up cloud chambers that heralded the beginning of research at the Cosmic Ray Laboratory (CRL) in Ooty. The next decade witnessed a variety of experiments involving high energy interactions and extensive air shower studies in this laboratory. The world's largest multiplate cloud chamber was operated here as part of an air shower array and significant results on the high energy nuclear interactions and cores of extensive air showers were obtained. A triple set-up comprising an air Cherenkov counter, a multiplate cloud chamber and a total absorption spectrometer was operated in the early seventies to study the differences in the characteristics of interactions with nuclei of protons and pions in the energy range 10-40 GeV. This enabled the time structure study of nuclear active components of air showers and led to the discovery that the nucleon-anti-nucleon production cross-section considerably increases with energy.

In continuation of the work on cosmic ray research at CRL, GRAPES-1 experiment was upgraded in various stages to GRAPES-2. However, due to the technical and administrative problem in its further expansion, a new experiment was set up at the RAC site 8 km from the old site which is called GRAPES-3. The GRAPES-3 experiment at present is operating with ~400 (each 1 m^{2}) plastic scintillator detectors with a separation of 8 meters, to record the density and arrival time of particles in cosmic ray showers, and in continuous operation. At present, GRAPES-3 array is the highest density conventional EAS array in the world, and also, this experiment associated with a huge 560 m^{2} area tracking muon detector, is also the largest area tracking detector anywhere.

== Results ==
Several results have recently been obtained from the GRAPES-3 experiment on a variety of topics, a few of which are listed below.

- Measurement of primary composition in the energy 50 TeV - 1 PeV overlapping with direct measurements
- Precision measurements of Forbush decrease events including rigidity dependence of its amplitude
- Measurement of turbulent magnetic field in the shock-sheath region in the Coronal mass ejections (CMEs) by using multi-rigidity muon data
- Precision measurement of the solar diurnal anisotropy and its higher harmonics including its rigidity dependence
- Precision measurement of the density gradient of cosmic rays in the solar system by probing Swinson flow
- Precision measurement of the anti-correlation between changes in solar wind velocity and cosmic ray intensity
- Measurement of the electrical potential, size and height of a thundercloud, which broke the existing record.

== Publications ==
- Hariharan, B.; et al. (2019). "Measurement of the Electrical Properties of a Thundercloud Through Muon Imaging by the GRAPES-3 Experiment". Physical Review Letters. 122 (10) 105101. arXiv:1903.09801. Bibcode:2019PhRvL.122j5101H. doi:10.1103/PhysRevLett.122.105101. PMID 30932668. S2CID 85500186.
- Mohanty, P. K.; et al. (2016). "Transient weakening of Earth's magnetic shield probed by a cosmic ray burst". Physical Review Letters. 117 (17) 171101. Bibcode:2016PhRvL.117q1101M. doi:10.1103/PhysRevLett.117.171101. PMID 27824449.
- "How India uses recycled pipes to detect ferocious solar storms" — BBC News article, 1.03.2017
