= TRACER (cosmic ray detector) =

Transition Radiation Array for Cosmic Energetic Radiation (TRACER) is a balloon flown cosmic ray detector built and designed at the University of Chicago. The detector is designed to measure the energy spectra of cosmic ray nuclei with atomic numbers between five and twenty-six (boron to iron).
