= MARIACHI =

MARIACHI, the Mixed Apparatus for Radar Investigation of Cosmic-rays of High Ionization, is an apparatus for the detection of ultra-high-energy cosmic rays (UHECR) via bi-static radar interferometry using VHF transmitters. MARIACHI is also the name of the research project created and directed by Brookhaven National Laboratory (BNL) on Long Island, New York, initially intended to verify the concept that VHF signals can be reflected off the ionization patch produced by a cosmic ray shower. Project emphasis subsequently shifted to the attempted detection of radio wave reflections from a high energy ionization beam apparatus located at BNL's NASA Space Radiation Laboratory.

Its inventors hope the MARIACHI apparatus will detect UHECR over much larger areas than previously possible, and that it will also detect ultra-high-energy neutrino flux. The ground array detectors are scintillator arrays that are built and operated by high school students and teachers.

The MARIACHI project, being in essence a public outreach project for high school and undergraduate students more than a full-scale science experiment, has continued in a sporadic fashion since its conception in the late 2000s. For example, a high school in New York continued MARIACHI measurements for over 8-year period between 2008 and 2016; the results of these measurements were published 2016. Measurements have been performed by other instances (high schools, community colleges,...) also.

The main researcher behind MARIACHI is Helio Takai (Brookhaven National Laboratory, Stony Brook University, as of 2019 Pratt Institute).
