= BESS (experiment) =

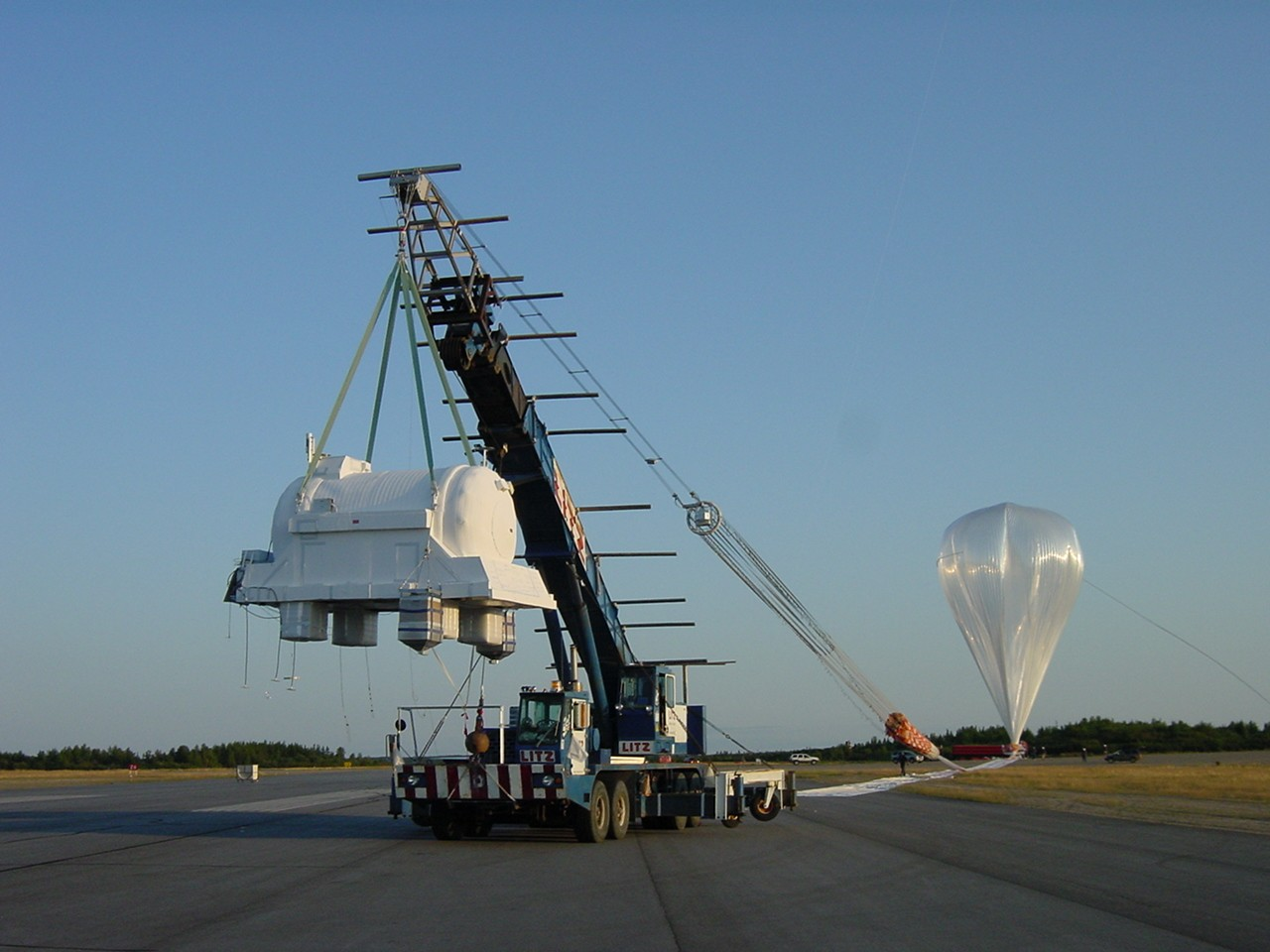
A BESS is prepared to lift off from Lynn Lake in Manitoba, Canada, in 2002

BESS is a particle physics experiment carried by a balloon. The acronym stands for stands for balloon-borne experiment with superconducting spectrometer.

== See also ==
- BOOMERanG experiment
