= Kathryn Flanagan =

American astronomer

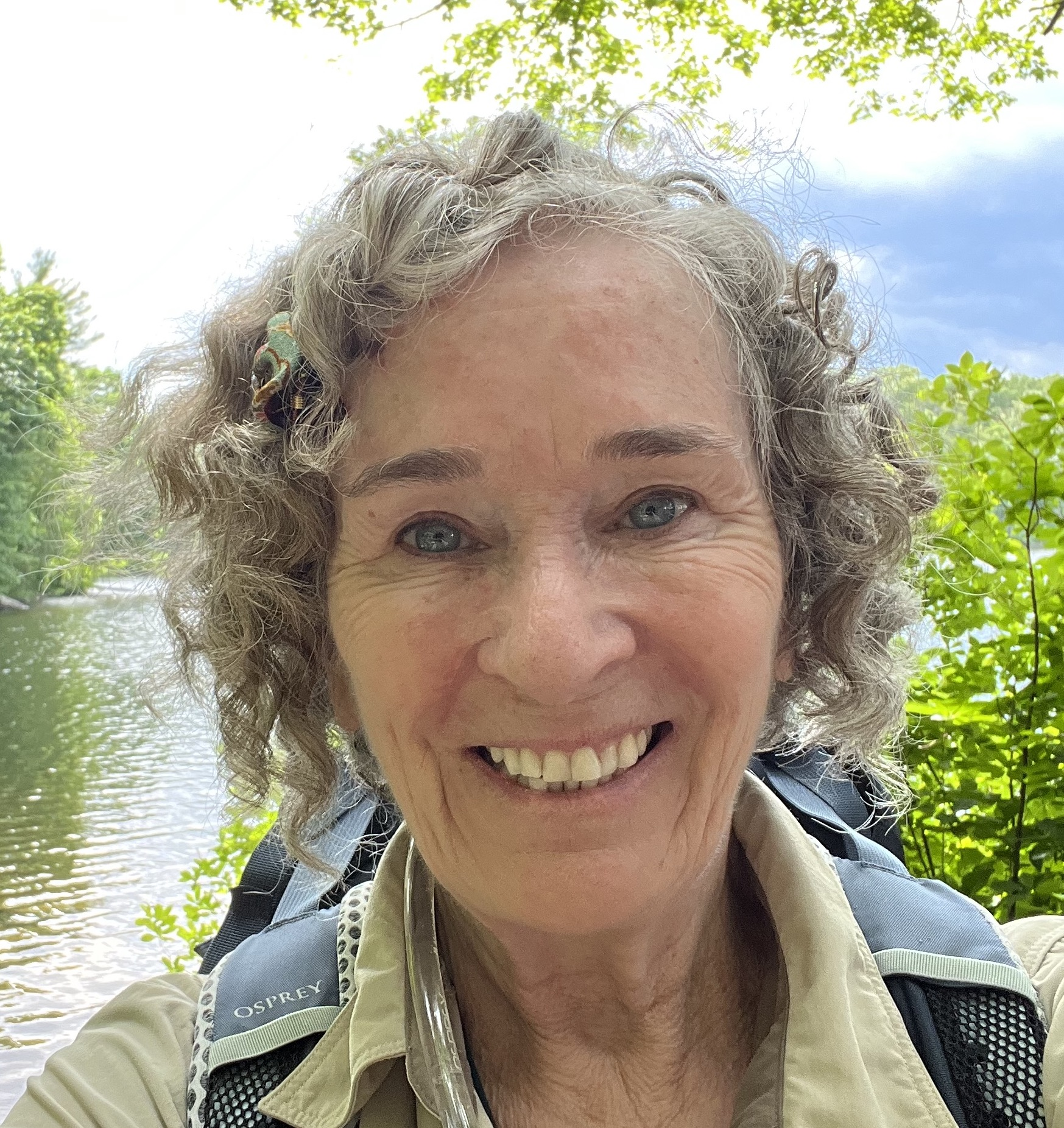
Kathryn Flanagan in 2022

Kathryn A. Flanagan is a retired American astronomer, the former interim director of the Space Telescope Science Institute, the operations center for the Hubble Space Telescope and James Webb Space Telescope. Her research also included work in X-ray astronomy using the Chandra X-ray Observatory.

== Education and career ==
Flanagan majored in physics at the Massachusetts Institute of Technology (MIT), graduating in 1976. She returned to graduate study for a master's degree in 1984 at New York University, and a Ph.D. in 1990 from MIT, involving the X-ray astronomy of Puppis A, a supernova remnant, under the supervision of Claude R. Canizares.

She worked as a researcher at the Center for Astrophysics | Harvard & Smithsonian from 1990 to 1995, and at MIT from 1995 to 2007, at both organizations working on instrumentation for the Chandra X-ray Observatory. She moved to the Space Telescope Science Institute in 2007, and headed the James Webb Space Telescope development project there from 2007 to 2012. In 2012, she became deputy director of the institute, and in 2015, she became interim director.

== Recognition ==
Flanagan was named a Fellow of the American Association for the Advancement of Science in 2019.
