= Bruno Rossi =

Italian-American experimental physicist (1905–1993)

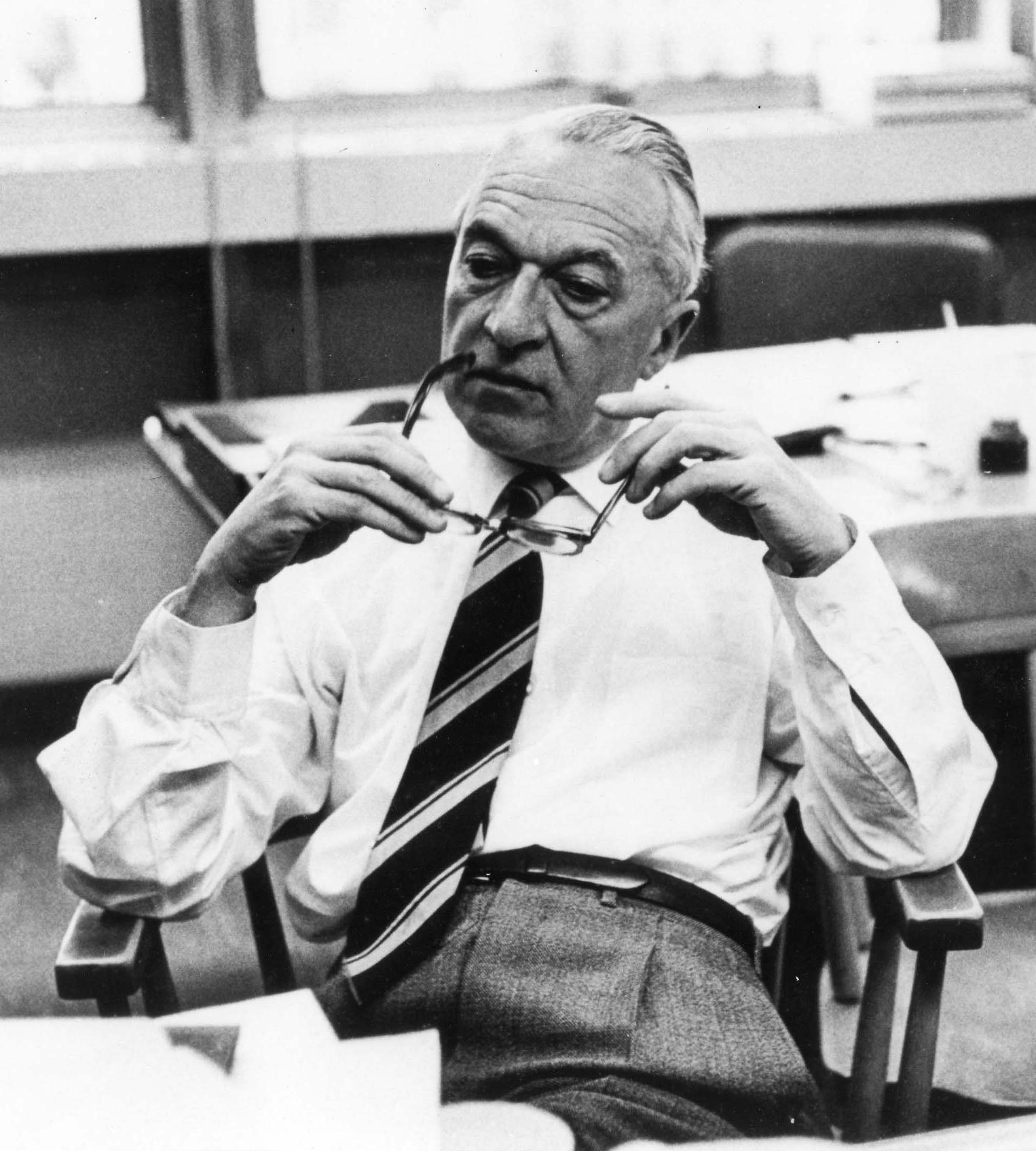
- Born: Bruno Benedetto Rossi; 13 April 1905; Venice, Italy
- Died: 21 November 1993 (aged 88); Cambridge, Massachusetts, U.S.
- Resting place: San Miniato al Monte Graveyard, Florence
- Citizenship: Italian; American (after 1943)
- Education: University of Bologna
- Spouse: Nora Lombroso (m. 1938)
- Children: 3
- Awards: Elliott Cresson Medal (1974); National Medal of Science (1983); Wolf Prize in Physics (1987); Matteucci Medal (1991)
- Scientific career
- Workplaces: University of Florence; University of Padua; University of Manchester; University of Chicago; Cornell University; Massachusetts Institute of Technology; University of Palermo
- Doctoral advisor: Quirino Majorana
- Doctoral students: Giuseppe Occhialini; Kenneth Greisen; Matthew Sands; Bernard Gregory; George W. Clark; Yash Pal; Herbert S. Bridge

Bruno Benedetto Rossi (/ˈrɒsi/ ROSS-ee, Italian: [ˈbruːno beneˈdetto ˈrossi]; 13 April 1905 – 21 November 1993) was an Italian-American experimental physicist. He made major contributions to particle physics and the study of cosmic rays. A 1927 graduate of the University of Bologna, he became interested in cosmic rays. To study them, he invented an improved electronic coincidence circuit and travelled to Eritrea to conduct experiments that showed that cosmic ray intensity from the West was significantly larger than that from the East.

Forced to emigrate in October 1938 due to the Italian racial laws, Rossi moved to Denmark, where he worked with Niels Bohr. He then moved to Britain, where he worked with Patrick Blackett at the University of Manchester. Finally, he went to the United States, where he worked with Enrico Fermi at the University of Chicago, and later at Cornell University. Rossi stayed in the United States and became an American citizen.

During World War II, Rossi worked on radar at the MIT Radiation Laboratory, and he played a pivotal role in the Manhattan Project, heading the group at the Los Alamos Laboratory that carried out the RaLa Experiments. After the war, he was recruited by Jerrold Zacharias at MIT, where Rossi continued his pre-war research into cosmic rays.

In the 1960s, he pioneered X-ray astronomy and space plasma physics. His instrumentation on Explorer 10 detected the magnetopause, and he initiated the rocket experiments that discovered Scorpius X-1, the first extra-solar source of X-rays.

== Italy ==
Rossi was born to a Jewish family in Venice, Italy. He was the eldest of three sons of Rino Rossi and Lina Minerbi. His father was an electrical engineer who participated in the electrification of Venice. Rossi was tutored at home until the age of fourteen, after which he attended the Ginnasio and the Liceo in Venice. After beginning his university studies at the University of Padua, he undertook advanced work at the University of Bologna, where he received a Laurea in Physics in 1927. His thesis advisor was Quirino Majorana, who was a well-known experimentalist and an uncle of the physicist Ettore Majorana.

=== Florence ===
In 1928, Rossi began his career at the University of Florence, as assistant to Antonio Garbasso, who had founded the University's Physics Institute in 1920. It was located in Arcetri, on a hill overlooking the city. When Rossi arrived, Garbasso was Podestà of Florence, appointed by Benito Mussolini's fascist government of Italy. However, he brought to the Institute a group of brilliant physicists which included Enrico Fermi and Franco Rasetti before they moved to Rome, as well as Gilberto Bernardini, Enrico Persico, and Giulio Racah. In 1929, Rossi's first graduate student, Giuseppe Occhialini, was awarded the doctoral degree.

In search of pioneering research, Rossi turned his attention to cosmic rays, which had been discovered by Victor Hess in manned balloon flights in 1911 and 1912. In 1929, Rossi read the paper of Walther Bothe and Werner Kolhörster, which described their discovery of charged cosmic ray particles that penetrated 4.1 centimetres (1.6 in) of gold. This was astonishing, for the most penetrating charged particles known at the time were electrons from radioactive decay, which could penetrate less than a millimetre of gold. In Rossi's words, it

came like a flash of light revealing the existence of an unsuspected world, full of mysteries, which no one had yet begun to explore. It soon became my overwhelming ambition to participate in the exploration.

=== Rossi coincidence circuit ===
In 1954, Bothe was awarded the Nobel Prize in Physics "for the coincidence method and his discoveries made therewith" for a method of assessing coincident events he implemented prior to 1924. However, his implementation of this method was very cumbersome, for it involved visual correlation of photographed pulses. Within a few weeks of reading his paper with Kolhörster, Rossi invented an improved electronic coincidence circuit, which made use of triode vacuum tubes. The Rossi coincidence circuit has two major advantages: it offers very precise temporal resolution, and it can detect coincidences among any number of pulse sources. These features make it possible to identify interesting events that produce coincident pulses in several counters. These rare events stand out even in the presence of high rates of unrelated background pulses in the individual counters. The circuit not only provided the basis for electronic instrumentation in nuclear and particle physics, but also implemented the first electronic AND circuit, which is a fundamental element of the digital logic that is ubiquitous in modern electronics.

At the time, an improved tubular version of the original Geiger counter, invented by Hans Geiger in 1908, had just been developed by his student Walther Müller. These Geiger–Müller tubes (GM tubes or counters) made possible Bothe's investigations. With Occhialini's help in the construction of GM tubes, and with the aid of a practical coincidence circuit, Rossi confirmed and extended the results of Bothe, who invited him to visit Berlin in the summer of 1930. Here, with financial support arranged by Garbasso, Rossi collaborated on further investigations of cosmic ray penetration. He also studied Carl Størmer's mathematical description of the trajectories of charged particles in the Earth's magnetic field. On the basis of these studies, he realised that the intensity of cosmic rays coming from eastward directions might be different from that of westward ones. From Berlin, he submitted the first paper suggesting that observations of this east–west effect could not only confirm that cosmic rays are charged particles, but also determine the sign of their charge.

=== Rome conference ===
At the Rome conference on nuclear physics in 1931, Rossi met Robert Millikan and Arthur Compton.

In the autumn of 1931, Fermi and Orso Mario Corbino organised in Rome an international conference on nuclear physics, which was sponsored by the Royal Academy of Italy. Fermi invited Rossi to give an introductory talk on cosmic rays. In the audience were Robert Millikan and Arthur Compton, both of whom had won the Nobel Prize in physics in 1923 and 1927, respectively. During the 1920s, Millikan, who is famous for his oil drop experiment, made extensive measurements of the mysterious radiation discovered by Hess. He coined the name "cosmic rays" and proposed that they were photons created by the fusion of hydrogen in interstellar space. He was not pleased by the presentation of evidence that most observed cosmic rays are energetic charged particles. Later, Rossi wrote:

Millikan clearly resented having his beloved theory torn to pieces by a mere youth, so much so that from that moment on he refused to recognise my existence. (In retrospect, I must admit that I might have been more tactful in my presentation.)

Compton, who is famous for the Compton effect, had a more positive reaction, for he told Rossi later that the talk had motivated him to begin his own research on cosmic rays.

=== Rossi curve ===
Immediately after the Rome conference, Rossi carried out two experiments that led to a significant advance in the understanding of cosmic rays. Both involved triple coincidences of pulses from three Geiger counters, but in the first, the counters were aligned and separated by blocks of lead, while in the second, they were placed in a triangular configuration such that all three could not be traversed by a single particle travelling in a straight line. Results from the first configuration demonstrated the existence of cosmic-ray particles capable of penetrating 1 metre (3 ft 3 in) of lead.

With the second configuration enclosed in a lead box, the results showed that some cosmic rays interact in lead to produce multiple secondary particles. In an extension of the second experiment, he measured the rate of triple coincidences as a function of the amount of lead above the counters. A plot of this rate against thickness, which came to be known as the Rossi curve, showed a rapid rise as the lead layer was increased, followed by a slow decline. These experiments showed that ground-level cosmic rays consist of two components: a "soft" component, which is capable of prolific generation of multiple particle events, and a "hard" component, which is capable of traversing great thicknesses of lead. At the time, the physical nature of both was a mystery, for they did not yet fit into the growing body of knowledge about nuclear and particle physics.

Late in 1931, Rossi arranged for Occhialini to work in the Cavendish Laboratory at the University of Cambridge with Patrick Blackett, whom he had met in Berlin. With the aid of the new technique of electronic coincidence, Occhialini helped Blackett develop the first counter-controlled cloud chamber, with which they confirmed Carl Anderson's discovery of the positron and deduced that the positive electrons are produced in association with negative ones by pair production. Up to 23 positive and negative electrons were observed in some events, which were clearly related to the showers of Rossi's soft component.

=== Padua ===
Rossi's Cosmic ray telescope

In 1932, Rossi won a competition for an academic position in an Italian university and was appointed professor of experimental physics at the University of Padua. Soon after Rossi arrived, the rector asked him to oversee the design and construction of Padua's new Physics Institute. Although this task diverted his attention from research and teaching, he complied willingly, and the institute opened in 1937.

=== East-West effect ===
In spite of this distraction, Rossi was able to complete, in 1933, an experiment on the east–west effect that he had begun before leaving Arcetri. Because this effect is more prominent near the equator, he organised an expedition to Asmara in Eritrea, which was then an Italian colony on the Red Sea at a latitude of 15° N. With Sergio De Benedetti, he set up a "cosmic ray telescope", which consisted of two separated GM counters in coincidence, whose axis of maximum sensitivity could be pointed in any direction. It soon became apparent that cosmic ray intensity from the West was significantly larger than that from the East. This meant that there was a larger influx of positive primary particles than of negative ones. At the time, this result was surprising because most investigators held the preconceived notion that the primaries would be negative electrons.

Just as Rossi left Eritrea, he received news of two observations of a similar east–west effect. These were published in the Physical Review. One was by Thomas H. Johnson, and the other was by Compton and his student, Luis Alvarez, who reported observations at Mexico City, where the latitude is 19° N. Because others had carried out the first experimental exploitation of his important idea of 1930, Rossi was disappointed, but published his results immediately after returning to Padua. Later, with Frederick C. Chromey, Alvarez and Rossi patented a "Vertical Determination Device", which made use of cosmic ray telescopes.

In Eritrea, Rossi discovered another phenomenon that would become a principal theme of his postwar cosmic ray research: extensive cosmic ray air showers. The discovery occurred during tests to determine the rate of accidental coincidences between the Geiger counters of his detector. To ensure that no single particle could trigger the counters, he spread them out in a horizontal plane. In this configuration, the frequency of coincidences was greater than that calculated on the basis of the individual rates and the resolving time of the coincidence circuit. Rossi concluded that:

... once in a while the recording equipment is struck by very extensive showers of particles, which cause coincidences between counters, even placed at large distances from one another.

In 1937, Rossi became acquainted with Nora Lombroso, the daughter of Ugo Lombroso, a professor of physiology at the University of Palermo, and Silvia Forti. Her grandfather was the renowned physician and criminologist Cesare Lombroso, and her aunts, Gina Lombroso and Paola Lombroso Carrara, were well-known Italian writers and educators. In April 1938, Bruno and Nora married and set up a household in Padua.

Although Rossi avoided politics, some of Rossi's associates were active opponents of the fascist state. For example, he mentored Eugenio Curiel, who became a member of the communist party, while completing a degree at Padua. Later, in 1943, Curiel joined the resistance in Milan, and in 1945, was assassinated by soldiers of the Republic of Salò, a German puppet state. Similarly, Ettore Pancini, who received his laurea under Rossi in 1938, spent the war years alternating between cosmic ray research and active participation in the Italian resistance movements of Padua and Venice.

Because of these associations, and because both Rossis were Jewish, they became apprehensive as Italy's antisemitism grew under the influence of Nazi Germany. Eventually, as a result of anti-Jewish laws resulting from the Manifesto of Race, Rossi was dismissed from his professorship. In his words:

Eventually, in September of 1938, I learned that I no longer was a citizen of my country, and that, in Italy, my activity as a teacher and a scientist had come to an end.

== Exile ==
With this setback, Rossi began an important phase of his career. He summarised this period in a memoir: "The Decay of 'Mesotrons' (1939–1943): Experimental Particle Physics in the Age of Innocence", which he presented in a symposium at Fermilab in 1980. On 12 October 1938, the Rossis left for Copenhagen, where the Danish physicist, Niels Bohr, had invited him to study. The couple had no intention of returning to Italy, and Bohr facilitated Rossi's search for a more secure position by sponsoring a conference attended by leading physicists. He hoped that one of them would find Rossi a job, and soon, Rossi received an invitation to come to the University of Manchester, where Blackett was developing a major centre of cosmic ray research. After a pleasant two months in Denmark, Rossi and Nora arrived in Manchester.

=== Manchester ===
Rossi's stay in Manchester was brief, but productive. At this time, a clear understanding of the soft component was available. In 1934, Hans Bethe and Walter Heitler published a quantitative description not only of the production of electron-positron pairs by energetic photons, but also of the production of photons by energetic electrons and positrons. At Manchester, Rossi collaborated with Ludwig Jánossy on an experiment which demonstrated the correctness of the Bethe-Heitler theory of the second process, which had not yet been fully confirmed. This experiment also introduced the technique of anti-coincidence, which has become a ubiquitous feature of instruments for detecting and analysing energetic particles.

By this time, cloud chamber observations had clarified the nature of the hard component. In 1936, Anderson and his student, Seth Neddermeyer, discovered cosmic ray particles with mass intermediate between those of the electron and the proton, which Anderson called "mesotrons". The mesotron subsequently became known as the "μ meson", which was shortened to "muon". Just before the Copenhagen conference, Blackett suggested that observed variations of cosmic ray intensity with atmospheric temperature could be an indication that mesotrons are unstable, and he held intense discussions with Rossi on this subject. As a result, Rossi left Manchester determined to confirm their decay and to measure the lifetime.

=== Chicago ===
With war looming over Europe, Blackett and others advised Rossi to leave Britain. Consequently, he wrote to Compton, who invited him to attend a summer symposium in Chicago, and hinted that a job might become available. In June 1939, the Rossis sailed for New York, where they were greeted by Fermi and his wife Laura, who had also left Italy because of the racial laws. After a brief reunion with the Fermis, the Rossis were offered a ride to Chicago by Bethe. They gratefully accepted and arrived at the University of Chicago in mid-June 1939.

=== Mesotron decay ===
Diagram of apparatus used in 1939 by Rossi, Hillberry, and Hoag to show that mesotrons are unstable. Note that the carbon absorber is removable and that the shaded areas represent lead absorbers.

Immediately after a symposium session on mesotron instability reached a consensus that more definitive observations were needed, Rossi and Compton began to plan an experiment. Because the intensity of the hard component increases with altitude, while the density of air decreases, Compton suggested that the investigations should be carried out on Mount Blue Sky in Colorado, where he had worked in the early 1930s, and where access to a research site at 4,310 metres (14,140 ft) elevation is provided by the Mount Blue Sky Scenic Byway, the highest paved road in North America. He urged Rossi to begin a series of experiments that summer, before snow blocked the road, and to help, enlisted two of his friends, Norman Hillberry and J. Barton Hoag, and a student, Winston Bostick. Rossi and his helpers hurriedly assembled equipment and loaded it onto a dilapidated bus that Compton borrowed from the zoology department.

By this time, it was known that the main process by which mesotrons lose energy is ionisation energy loss, which is described by the Bethe formula, and is proportional to the mass per unit area of the layer of material traversed. If this were the only process, the intensity of the hard component passing through a layer of solid material would decrease by the same amount as in an equivalent layer of air. Rossi and his collaborators found that the decrease was significantly larger in the atmosphere than in a corresponding layer of solid carbon. Because the distance traversed in air was much larger than that in carbon, they interpreted this result as evidence for decay of the mesotron, and taking into account the effect of relativistic time dilation, estimated its mean life at rest as roughly 2 microseconds.

The next summer, Rossi returned to Mount Evans, where he performed experiments near Echo Lake at an elevation 3,230 metres (10,600 ft). With the use of anti-coincidence techniques, the apparatus made it possible to measure the mean free path before decay of two groups of mesotrons with different average momentum. The results, published with David B. Hall, not only confirmed the proportionality between particle momentum and the mean free path of mesotrons before decay that is expected on the basis of relativity theory, but also presented an improved estimate of the lifetime at rest: (2.4±0.3) microseconds. These results and those of the previous year were not only the first to show definitively that mesotrons are unstable, but also the first experimental confirmation of the time dilation of moving clocks predicted by relativity theory.

=== Cornell ===
In Chicago, Rossi's position as research associate was not permanent, and Compton was unable to secure him a better one. Consequently, he began a job search, during which he gave a seminar at Cornell University, where, coincidentally, death had created a vacancy in the physics department. After Bethe suggested that Rossi should be invited to fill this position, he was appointed associate professor at Cornell. In the fall of 1940, after returning to Chicago from Colorado, the Rossis left for Ithaca.

At Cornell, Rossi met his first American graduate student, Kenneth Greisen, with whom he wrote an article, "Cosmic-Ray Theory", which was published in the Reviews of Modern Physics and became known among cosmic-ray researchers as "The Bible". During the summer of 1941, Greisen and physicists from Denver and Boulder accompanied Rossi to Mount Evans, where they refined the knowledge of proportionality between mesotron momentum and lifetime before decay. Greisen and Rossi also carried out experiments, which showed, in terms of processes documented in the "Bible", that not all particles of the soft component could be produced by mesotrons of the hard component. They interpreted this as evidence for primary electrons or photons, but it became evident later that the soft excess arises from the decay of neutral pions.

After the 1941 expedition to Colorado, Rossi decided that the question of whether mesotrons decay had been answered. However, he was not satisfied with the precision with which the lifetime had been determined, for existing estimates depended on mesotron mass, which was not accurately known. To perform a more direct measurement, he designed an apparatus to measure the time interval between the arrival of a mesotron in an absorber, where it stopped, and the emission of an electron when the mesotron decayed. To assist, he obtained the help of graduate student Norris Nereson. At the heart of their experiment was a "chronometer", which was an electronic circuit that produced a pulse whose height was accurately proportional to the time interval, and which could be recorded by photographing an oscilloscope trace.

This was the first time-to-amplitude converter, another of Rossi's contributions to electronic techniques of experimental physics. With absorbers of lead and brass, the number of decays was plotted against time. These decay curves had the same exponential form as those of ordinary radioactive substances, and gave a mean lifetime of 2.3±0.2 microseconds, which was later refined to 2.15±0.07 microseconds. After the war, Rossi discovered that his Italian colleagues, Marcello Conversi and Oreste Piccioni, had performed experiments very similar to his and measured a lifetime consistent with his result.

Looking back on what he called the "Age of Innocence", Rossi wrote:

How is it possible that results bearing on fundamental problems of elementary particle physics could be achieved by experiments of an almost childish simplicity, costing only a few thousand dollars and requiring only the help of one or two graduate students?

== Los Alamos ==
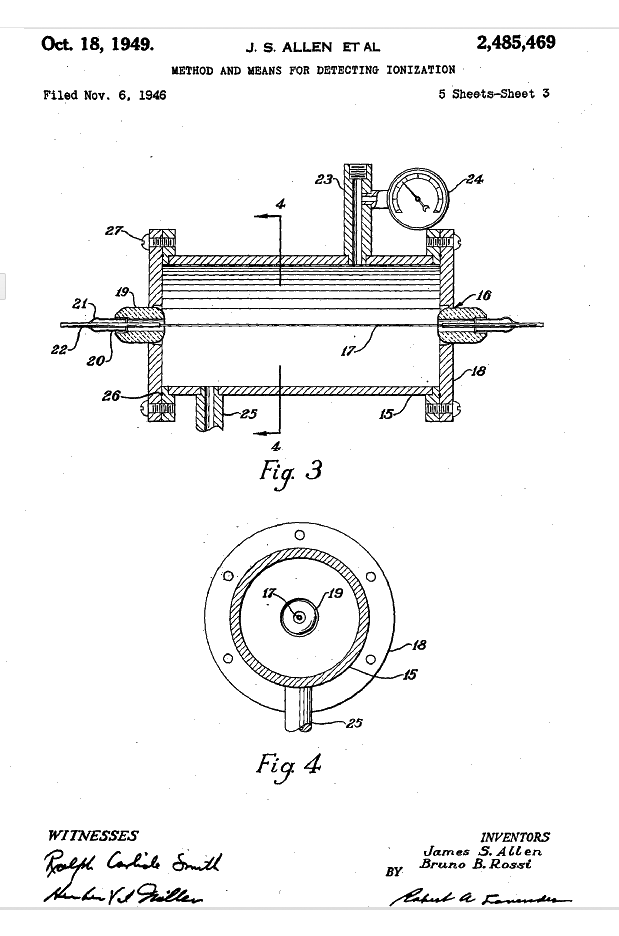
Drawings of a cylindrical fast ion chamber from Allen and Rossi's US Patent: 2485469

With the completion of his work on mesotrons, Rossi turned his attention toward the war effort. In 1942, while commuting from Ithaca to Cambridge, Massachusetts, he became a consultant on radar development at the Radiation Laboratory of the Massachusetts Institute of Technology. Here, along with Greisen, he invented a "range tracking circuit", which was patented after the war.

In early July 1943, Bethe invited Rossi to join the Manhattan Project. Within a month, he reported for duty at Los Alamos Laboratory. A few weeks later, Nora and their three-year-old daughter, Florence, joined Rossi in Los Alamos, New Mexico. The laboratory's director, Robert Oppenheimer, asked Rossi to form a group to develop diagnostic instruments needed to create the atomic bomb. He soon realised that there already existed a group with a similar mission headed by the Swiss physicist Hans H. Staub. The two decided to merge their efforts into a single "Detector Group". They were assisted by approximately twenty young researchers, including Matthew Sands an "electronic wizard", who later earned a PhD under Rossi, and David B. Nicodemus, whom Staub brought from Stanford University, who was an expert on particle detectors.

=== Fast ionization chamber ===
Bomb development called for large detectors of ionising radiation, whose response is proportional to the energy released in the detector and follows rapid changes in radiation intensity. From the earliest research on radioactivity, radiation had been measured in terms of Ionisation, but existing Ionisation chambers were slow to respond to changes. To address this problem, Rossi and Staub carried out a careful analysis of the pulses that result when individual charged particles create ions within an ionisation chamber. They realised that the high mobility of free electrons removed from ionised atoms means that the pulses produced by single particles can be very brief. With James S. Allen, Rossi found gas mixtures of high electron mobility and low electron attachment. On the basis of these investigations, Allen and Rossi invented the "fast ionisation chamber", which they patented after the war. It was a crucial factor in the success of the Manhattan Project and became widely used in postwar research on particle physics.

=== RaLa experiments ===
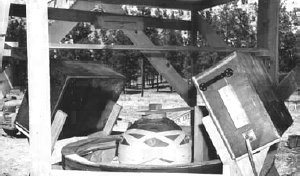
Experimental setup for RaLa shot 78 on 13 May 1947, at Bayo Canyon. Each rectangular box contains eight cylindrical ionisation chambers, similar to those of the patent drawings.

In April 1944, the Manhattan Project experienced a crisis when Emilio Segrè's group discovered that plutonium made in reactors would not work in a gun-type plutonium weapon like the "Thin Man". In response, Oppenheimer completely reorganised the laboratory to focus on the development of an implosion-type weapon.

Rossi was enlisted to implement a method to test various weapon designs to arrive at one that produced an accurately symmetrical spherical implosion. The tests measured changes in the absorption of gamma rays in a metal sphere as it underwent implosive compression. The gamma rays were emitted by a pellet of the short-lived radioisotope Lanthanum-140 positioned in the centre of the sphere. The term RaLa experiment is a contraction of Radioactive Lanthanum. As compression progressed, the rapid increase in absorption was detected as a decrease in gamma ray intensity recorded outside of the assembly.

The RaLa experiments revealed many pitfalls on the way to a successful implosion. To understand problematic jets that plagued early implosion designs, other test methods were necessary, but the RaLa experiments played a primary role in the design of explosive lenses. In his history of the Los Alamos project, David Hawkins wrote: "RaLa became the most important single experiment affecting the final bomb design".

=== Trinity diagnostics ===
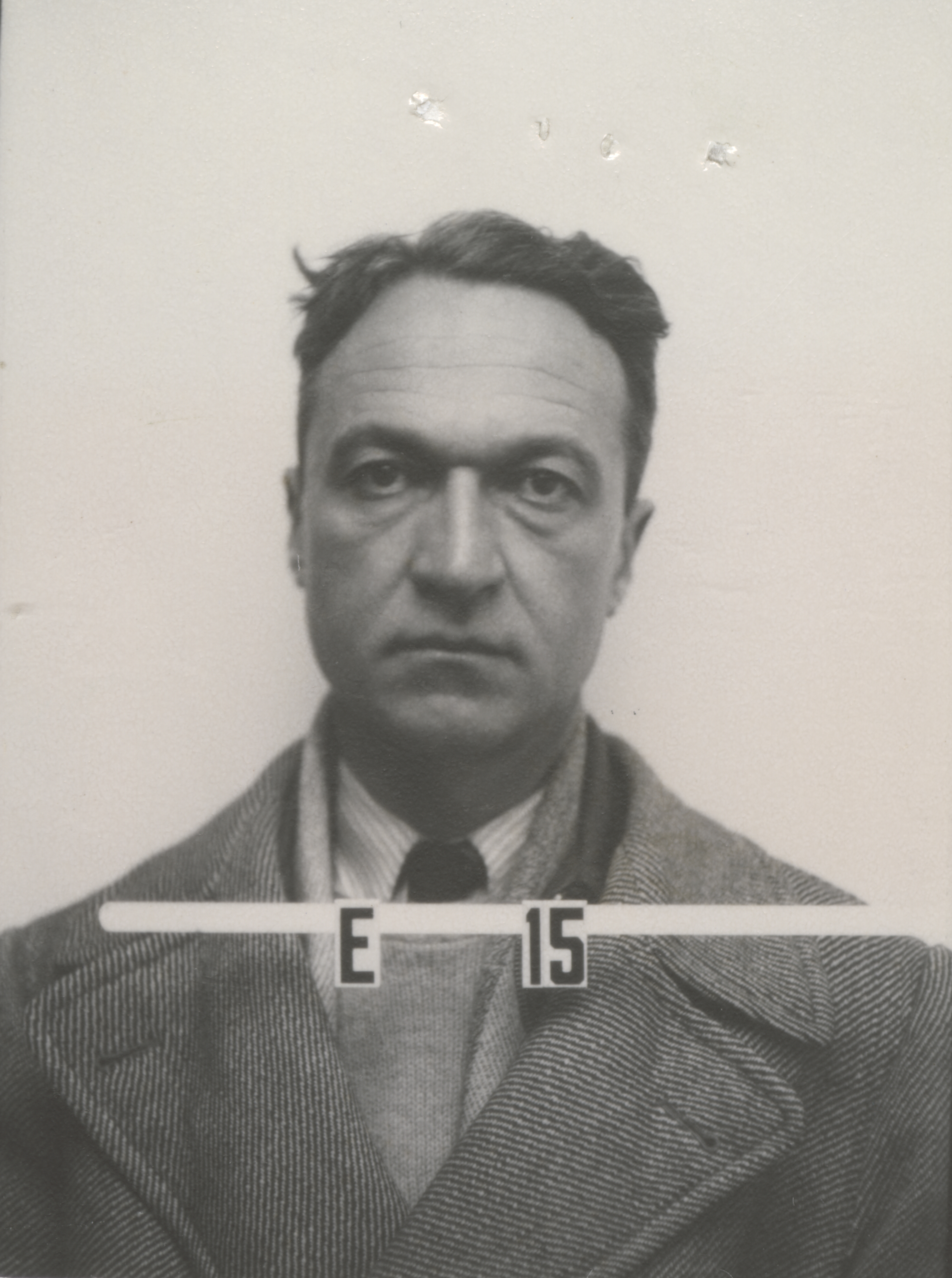
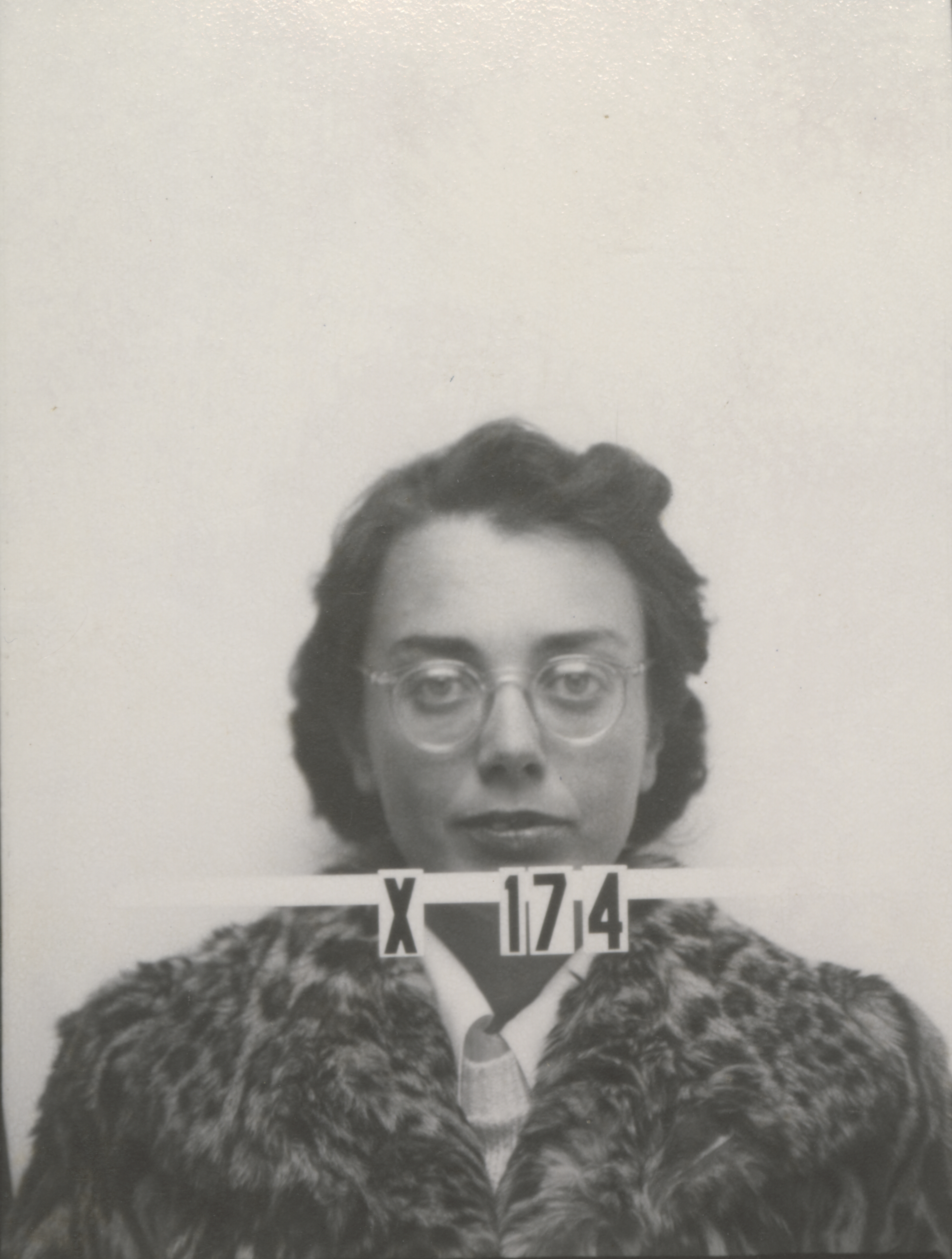
Bruno and Nora Rossi's Los Alamos badges

On 16 July 1945, an implosion-type plutonium device was detonated at the Trinity site near Alamogordo, New Mexico. The code name for this device was "The gadget", and its design was very similar to the Fat Man weapon that was dropped on Nagasaki twenty-four days later.

In preparation for Trinity, Rossi designed instrumentation to record gamma radiation during the chain reaction, whose duration was expected to be approximately 10 nanoseconds. Observations on this time scale were almost beyond the state of the art in 1945, but Rossi designed and built a large cylindrical ionisation chamber whose speed of response was adequate because its coaxial electrodes were separated by a narrow gap of only 1 centimetre (0.39 in).

To record the signal, he installed a very fast oscilloscope, provided as a prototype by DuMont Laboratories, in an underground bunker several hundred feet from the Gadget, where it was photographed. To bring the signal to the oscilloscope, he devised an oversized coaxial transmission line, whose inner conductor was made smaller as it went from chamber to oscilloscope. Because this configuration enhanced the signal reaching the oscilloscope, there was no need for amplification. To confirm this surprising behaviour, Rossi consulted with Harvard professor Edward Purcell.

A few days after the test, Rossi went into the darkroom with Fermi, and before the newly developed film was dry, they were able to compute the initial growth rate of nuclear activity, which was crucial information for future weapons development. Of three attempts to measure this rate at Trinity, Rossi's was the only one that was fully successful.

== MIT ==
With the success of the Manhattan Project and the Radiation Laboratory, MIT moved into a new era of "big science" funded by the US government. MIT's expansion in nuclear physics was spearheaded by Jerrold R. Zacharias, who went to Los Alamos late in the war, and recruited Viki Weisskopf and Rossi as MIT professors. Rossi left Los Alamos for Cambridge on 6 February 1946.

Within the new Laboratory for Nuclear Science, headed by Zacharias, Rossi was delegated to create a cosmic ray research group at MIT. To help, he recruited four young scientists who had been at Los Alamos as PhD candidates: Herbert S. Bridge, Matthew Sands, Robert Thompson and Robert Williams. Two who had been in the Radiation Laboratory also came to work with him: John Tinlot and Robert Hulsizer. All six were more mature than typical graduate students, for they had several years of wartime research experience. Consequently, they were paid a stipend similar to that of a postdoctoral researcher, which was funded by the Office of Naval Research and enabled them to support families during their graduate studies.

For this new phase of his activities, Rossi made a fundamental change of approach. In his words:

In my new position, my activity would be very different from what it had been in past years. Then, working alone or, at most, with the help of a few students, I would build the instruments, take them to the place where they had to be used, make the measurements and analyse the results. Now, I had the responsibility of an entire group, and what mattered was not my own work but the work of the group. My task was to identify the most promising research programs among those that were within our reach, to help where help was needed in the planning of the instrumentation or in the evaluation of experimental results, all of this without discouraging the individual initiative of the researchers.

=== Elementary Particles ===
With the discovery of the pion in 1947, the search for new elementary particles became a popular research topic. By operating fast ionisation chambers within a cloud chamber, Herbert showed that the bursts of ionisation they recorded were primarily produced by relatively low-energy cosmic rays, whose nuclear interactions typically involve the ejection of several heavily ionising nuclear fragments. On the basis of this effect, he and Rossi demonstrated that the behaviour of these interactions is similar to that of penetrating showers.

Rossi's group focused on the use of cloud chambers to study their properties and interactions. In 1948, with the aid of a multi-plate cloud chamber in which lead plates alternated with aluminium ones, Gregory, Rossi and Tinlot showed that the source of the electromagnetic component of cosmic ray interactions was predominantly energetic photons, rather than electrons. This result confirmed Oppenheimer's suggestion of 1947 that neutral pions are produced in interactions, along with charged ones, and that this component arises from their rapid decay into photons.

To study the new elementary particles, Bridge and Martin Annis operated a large rectangular multiplate cloud chamber at Echo Lake. This investigation provided the basis for a 1951 PhD thesis by Annis, supervised by Rossi. The next year, these authors, with another student of Rossi's, Stanislaw Olbert, showed how to derive information on particle energies from measurements of their multiple scattering. This added another way to use cloud chambers to measure the properties of elementary particles. In early 1953, with Bridge, Richard Safford and Charles Peyrou, Rossi published results of a comprehensive cloud chamber study of the elementary particles that became known as kaons. Peyrou was a visitor from at the École Polytechnique, where he had obtained an accurate value of the muon mass in 1947, and Safford was Rossi's student.

=== Bagnères-de-Bigorre conference ===
By 1952, a bewildering "zoo" of elementary particles had been reported, with various masses, decay schemes, nomenclature and reliability of identification. To deal with this situation, Blackett and Leprince-Ringuet organised an International Cosmic Ray Conference at Bagnères-de-Bigorre in 1953. According to James Cronin, "this conference can be placed in importance in the same category as two other famous conferences, the Solvay congress of 1927 and the Shelter Island Conference of 1948."

Leprince-Ringuet asked Rossi to give a summary of new information presented at the conference and to propose nomenclature for the new particles. Before the conference, in response to the latter assignment, Rossi circulated a suggestion that particles with mass smaller than that of a neutron be designated by small Greek letters and those with larger mass be designated by capital Greek letters. In his talk, on 11 July 1953, he reported that conference results, which he had compiled with the aid of Powell and Fretter, were consistent with this scheme, which was commonly used afterwards.

A highlight was Leprince-Ringuet's declaration in his closing talk that: "...in the future we must use particle accelerators". With the 3 GeV Cosmotron already in operation at Brookhaven National Laboratory, this declaration reflected a consensus among the participants. As a result, Rossi's group began to wind down their cloud chamber experiments. However, in 1954, Bridge, Hans Courant, Herbert DeStaebler, Jr. and Rossi reported on an unusual event in which a stopping singly charged particle decayed into three photons whose energies totalled more than the proton rest energy. This is the signature of an antiproton annihilation. The next year, a group led by Owen Chamberlain and Emilio Segrè detected antiprotons, for which they were awarded the Nobel Prize in Physics in 1960.

=== Extensive air showers ===
By the time of the Bagnères-de-Bigorre conference, Rossi had already turned his attention toward the astrophysical implications of cosmic ray phenomena, particularly extensive air showers. After Rossi's recognition, in Eritrea, that these events exist, they were extensively studied by Pierre Auger, and by Williams. At this time, the extremely fast response of the newly developed scintillation counters offered a new way to study the structure of air showers. To do this, Rossi enlisted his student, George W. Clark, who completed a PhD in 1952, and Piero Bassi, who was a visitor from the University of Padua. Because solid scintillating material was unavailable, they decided to use terphenyl dissolved in benzine, which is an efficient liquid scintillator. With the aid of three counters deployed on the roof of the MIT Physics building during the winter of 1952/53, they found that shower particles arrived within only one or two meters of a disk, which travels at nearly the speed of light in the direction of the shower axis.

This result showed that scintillation counters can not only determine the arrival times of shower disks at many detectors spread over a large area, but also estimate the number of particles striking each detector. These capabilities combine the "fast-timing" method of determining shower arrival directions with the density sampling method of determining their size and the location of their axes.

==== Agassiz experiment ====
With this progress, Rossi's group began a major experiment that could measure both primary energies and arrival directions of extensive air showers. Participating in this effort were: George Clark, William Kraushaar, John Linsley, James Earl, and Frank Scherb. Kraushaar came to MIT from Cornell in 1949, after earning his PhD under Kenneth Greisen. With the support of Professor Donald Menzel, who was director of the Harvard College Observatory, Rossi's group deployed fifteen liquid scintillators, of area 1 square metre (11 sq ft), on the wooded grounds of the observatory's Agassiz station. The signals were brought on cables to a Quonset hut, where they were displayed on fifteen oscillographs and recorded photographically.

Shortly after the experiment began to record shower data, lightning ignited the flammable liquid of one of the counters. Local firemen quickly extinguished the resulting fire before it spread to nearby trees, which were soaked with rainwater. Because the trees played an essential role in suppressing atmospheric convection that would degrade telescopic observations, Harvard and MIT carried out tense negotiations until an elaborate system of fire protection was installed, and the experiment was allowed to resume. To eliminate the threat of fire, Clark, Frank Scherb and William B. Smith created a "factory" that made nonflammable plastic scintillator disks, whose thickness was 10 centimetres (3.9 in) and whose diameter was approximately 1 metre (3 ft 3 in).

After a switch to plastic in the late spring of 1956, the experiment ran continuously. Its findings were reported in Nature and the Physical Review. The most important results were summarized by Rossi as:

1. A precise measurement of the density of shower particles as a function of distance from the shower centre.
2. A measurement of the energy spectrum of the primary particles responsible for the showers from 10^{15} electron volt to 10^{18} electron volt.
3. The proof that these particles arrive in practically equal numbers from all directions.
4. The observation of a particle with an energy close to 10^{19} electron volt.

As the Agassiz experiment came to an end, the group realised that observations near the equator and in the southern hemisphere were needed to extend their conclusion that air shower arrival directions are nearly isotropic. Consequently, Clark, in collaboration with Vikram Sarabhai, ran his smaller experiment at Kodaikanal, India, at a latitude of 10° N, and confirmed the absence of anisotropies. Later, at the suggestion of Ismael Escobar, the Agassiz equipment was moved to El Alto at 4200 metres on the Bolivian plateau at 16° S. Here, Clark, Escobar and Juan Hersil found no anisotropies, but they showed that the structure of air showers at their maximum development is different from that at sea level.

==== Volcano Ranch experiment ====
The maximum energy of a particle recorded by the Agassiz experiment, 10^{19} electron volt, is close to energies beyond which charged particles can not be confined to the galactic disc by typical interstellar magnetic fields of 10^{−5} gauss. A detector array of very large dimensions is needed to detect showers of these energies. John Linsley agreed to take on the responsibility for building such an array. He came to MIT in 1954 from the University of Minnesota, where he completed a PhD under Edward P. Ney. Soon, he was joined by Livio Scarsi, whom Rossi had recruited from Occhialini's group at the University of Milan.

Because no large enough tract of open land was available near Boston, the array was constructed on a semi-desert property known as Volcano Ranch, about 16 miles (26 km) west of Albuquerque, New Mexico, at an altitude of 1,770 metres (5,810 ft). During 1957 and 1958, Linsley and Scarsi deployed 19 scintillation counters, which used fluorescent plastic disks similar to those of the Agassiz detectors, except that each counter incorporated four disks viewed by four photomultipliers. Initially the area of the array was 2.5*10^{6} m^{2}, which is to be compared with Agassiz's 10^{5} m^{2}, but in 1960, after Scarsi had returned to Milan, Linsley spread the detectors over an area of 10^{7} m^{2}.

Results from the Volcano Ranch experiment showed that the cosmic-ray intensity decreases smoothly with energy from 10^{17} - 10^{18} electron volt. and that primaries in this range arrive isotropically. Of particular significance was the detection of a single particle whose energy of 10^{20} electron volt is larger than the maximum that could be contained in the galactic disc by galactic magnetic fields. Particles of these energies can only originate in the galactic halo or from beyond the galaxy, and their existence is not consistent with the Greisen-Zatsepin-Kuzmin limit.

=== Space plasma research ===
On 4 October 1957, the Soviet Union launched the first artificial Earth satellite, Sputnik 1. This event began the Sputnik crisis, a "wave of near-hysteria" among a surprised American public. In response, the U.S. government increased funding for the National Science Foundation, and in 1958, created both the National Aeronautics and Space Administration (NASA) and the Advanced Research Projects Agency, which was renamed the Defense Advanced Research Projects Agency (DARPA) in 1972. On 4 June 1958, two days after legislation creating NASA was introduced, Detlev W. Bronk, chairman of the National Academy of Sciences, met with the heads of these three agencies to create a new advisory body, the Space Science Board, to provide advice for the expansion of space research and to make sure that funding of fundamental science would be properly emphasized.

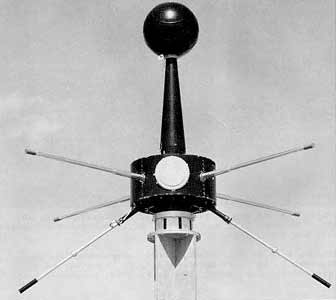
Explorer 10 satellite. The white circular cap covers the opening of the MIT Faraday cup.

The Board convened for its first meeting on 27 June 1958. Only four members were already engaged in space research: Rossi, Leo Goldberg, John Simpson, and James Van Allen. Rossi formed a subcommittee which included Thomas Gold, Philip Morrison and biologist Salvador Luria, who agreed that investigations of plasma in interplanetary space would be desirable. Consequently, Rossi decided to turn his group's efforts towards its study. With Herbert Bridge, Rossi designed and tested a plasma probe based on the classical Faraday cup. However, to enhance the instrument's response to positively charged protons and to suppress its response to photoelectrons produced by sunlight, four grids were deployed within the cup. A key innovation was a modulating voltage applied to one of the grids, which converted the signal into an alternating current, proportional to the proton flux and uncontaminated by any contribution of photoelectrons.

After intense lobbying of Homer Newell, NASA's deputy director of space flight programs, Rossi secured a flight opportunity on Explorer 10, "Goddard's first home-grown satellite". The unannounced goal was to hit the Moon, but after launch on 25 March 1961, the satellite went into a highly elongated orbit around Earth, whose apogee, at 70% of the distance to the Moon, was well short of this goal.

Nevertheless, during 52 hours of data recorded by the MIT probe before battery power ran out, Rossi's group found a transition between two distinct regions around Earth. Near Earth, there were fairly strong and well-organised magnetic fields, but no indication of interplanetary protons. At 22 Earth radii, the spacecraft entered a region where magnetic fields were weaker and more irregular, and where a substantial flux of protons was observed coming from the general direction of the Sun. On several occasions during the rest of the flight, this flux disappeared and then reappeared again, which indicated that the spacecraft was flying close to the boundary between the two regions and that this boundary was moving irregularly. Eventually, this boundary became known as the magnetopause.

Under Bridge and Rossi, the MIT space plasma group included Frank Scherb, Edwin Lyon, Alan Lazarus, Alberto Bonnetti, Alberto Egidi, John Belcher, and Constance Dilworth, who was Occhialini's wife. Its Faraday cups have collected data on plasma throughout the Solar System: near Earth on OGO-1, OGO 3 and IMP 8, in interplanetary space on WIND, and in the Heliosphere and Heliosheath on Voyager 1 and Voyager 2.

=== X-Ray astronomy ===
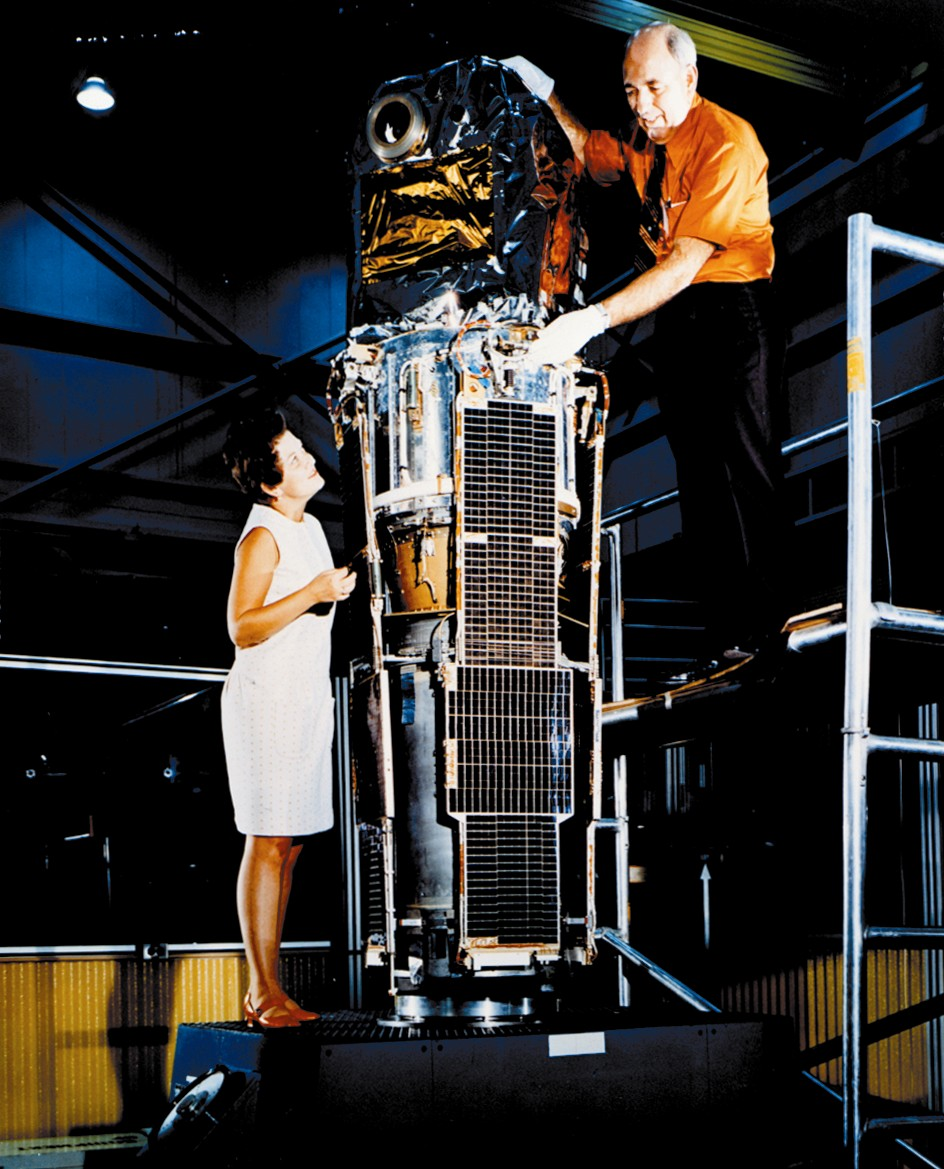
Marjorie Townsend discusses the X-ray Explorer Satellite's performance with Bruno Rossi during preflight tests at NASA's Goddard Space Flight Center

As a consultant to American Science and Engineering, Inc., Rossi initiated the rocket experiments that discovered the first extra-solar source of X-rays, Scorpius X-1. Rossi was made institute professor at MIT in 1966.

=== Retirement ===
Rossi retired from MIT in 1970. From 1974 to 1980, he taught at the University of Palermo. In retirement, he wrote a number of monographs and a 1990 autobiography, Moments in the Life of a Scientist, which was published by Cambridge University Press. He died from a cardiac arrest at his home in Cambridge on 21 November 1993. He was survived by his wife, Nora, daughters Florence and Linda and son Frank. He was cremated, and his ashes are in the graveyard of the church of San Miniato al Monte, which overlooks Florence and the hill of Arcetri.

== Honors and awards ==
=== Awards ===
- Wolf Prize in Physics for his role in the development of X-ray astronomy (1987)
- National Medal of Science (1985)
- Rumford Prize award of the American Academy of Arts and Sciences for "discoveries concerning the nature and origins of cosmic radiations" (1976)
- Elliott Cresson Medal (1974)
- Gold Medal of the Italian Physical Society (1970)
- Doctors honoris causa from the universities of Palermo, Durham, and Chicago

=== Honours ===
- Elected to the American Academy of Arts and Sciences (1948)
- Elected to the United States National Academy of Sciences (1950)
- Elected to the American Philosophical Society (1959)

=== Legacy ===
- Rossi X-ray Timing Explorer, a NASA satellite X-ray observatory launched in 1995.
- Bruno Rossi Prize of the High Energy Astrophysics division of the American Astronomical Society.
- There is an endowed chair named in honour of Bruno Rossi at MIT. It is currently held by Prof. Claude R. Canizares.

== Books ==
- Rossi, Bruno (1952). High-energy Particles. New York: Prentice-Hall. OCLC 289682.
- Rossi, Bruno (1964). Cosmic Rays. New York: McGraw-Hill.
- Rossi, Bruno; S. Olbert (1970). Introduction to the Physics of Space. New York: McGraw-Hill.
- Rossi, Bruno (1990). Moments in the Life of a Scientist. Cambridge: Cambridge University Press. ISBN 0-521-36439-6.
- Rossi, Bruno (1957). Optics. Reading, MA: Addison Wesley.
- Rossi, Bruno (1959). "High-energy cosmic rays". Sci. Am. 201 (5) (published November 1959): 135–46. Bibcode:1959SciAm.201e.134R. doi:10.1038/scientificamerican1159-134. PMID 14439229.
