= Scorpius X-1 =

Astronomical X-ray source

Observation data Epoch J2000.0 Equinox ICRS
- Constellation: Scorpius
- Right ascension: 16^{h} 19^{m} 55.0693^{s}
- Declination: −15° 38′ 24.018″
- Apparent magnitude (V): 12.40

Characteristics
- Spectral type: M4-M5V
- Variable type: X-ray binary

Astrometry
Proper motion (μ)	RA: −7.185 mas/yr Dec.: −12.332 mas/yr
Parallax (π)	0.4297±0.0220 mas
Distance	7,600 ± 400 ly (2,300 ± 100 pc)

Orbit
Period (P)	0.7873114(5) days
Semi-major axis (a)	4.37 R_{☉}
Inclination (i)	25–34°
Semi-amplitude (K_{1}) (primary)	74.9±0.5 km/s

Details

Optical star
Mass	0.40 M_{☉}
Radius	1.25 R_{☉}
Luminosity	0.114 L_{☉}
Temperature	2,500–3,050 K

Neutron star
Mass	1.4 M_{☉}
Radius	15–20 km
Temperature	(3–5)×10^{7} K

Other designations
- V818 Sco, H 1620-15, RE J1619-153, XSS J16204-1536, 2U 1617-15, 4U 1617-15

Database references
SIMBAD	data

Scorpius X-1 is a low-mass X-ray binary located roughly 9,000 light years away in the constellation Scorpius. Scorpius X-1 was the first extrasolar X-ray source discovered, and, aside from the Sun, it is the strongest apparent non-transient source of X-rays in the sky.

== Discovery and early study ==
The possible existence of cosmic soft X-rays was first proposed by Bruno Rossi, MIT professor and board chairman of American Science and Engineering in Cambridge, Massachusetts to Martin Annis, president of AS&E. Following his urging, the company obtained a contract from the United States Air Force to explore the lunar surface prior to the launch of astronauts to the Moon, and incidentally to perhaps see galactic sources of X-rays.

Subsequently, Scorpius X-1 was discovered in 1962 by a team, under Riccardo Giacconi, who launched an Aerobee 150 sounding rocket carrying a highly sensitive soft X-ray detector designed by Frank Paolini. The rocket trajectory was slightly off course but still detected a significant emission of soft X-rays that were not coming from the Moon. Thus fortuitously, and as first pointed out by Frank Paolini, Scorpius X-1 became the first X-ray source discovered outside the Solar System. The angular resolution of the detector did not initially allow the position of Scorpius X-1 to be accurately determined. This led to suggestions that the source might be located near the Galactic Center, but it was eventually realized that it lies in the constellation Scorpius. As the first discovered X-ray source in Scorpius, it received the designation Scorpius X-1.

The Aerobee 150 rocket launched on June 12, 1962 or June 19, 1962, detected the first X-rays from another celestial source (Scorpius X-1) at J1950 RA 16^{h} 15^{m} Dec −15.2°. The rocket was designed to observe X-rays from the moon rather than smaller, extrasolar sources, and therefore was unable to accurately retrieve the position and strength of the X-ray signal. The source was estimated to be at J1950 coordinates RA 16^{h} 15^{m} Dec −15.2°.

In 1967, before the discovery of pulsars, Iosif Shklovsky examined X-ray and optical observations of Scorpius X-1 and correctly concluded that the radiation comes from a neutron star accreting matter from a companion.

== Characteristics ==
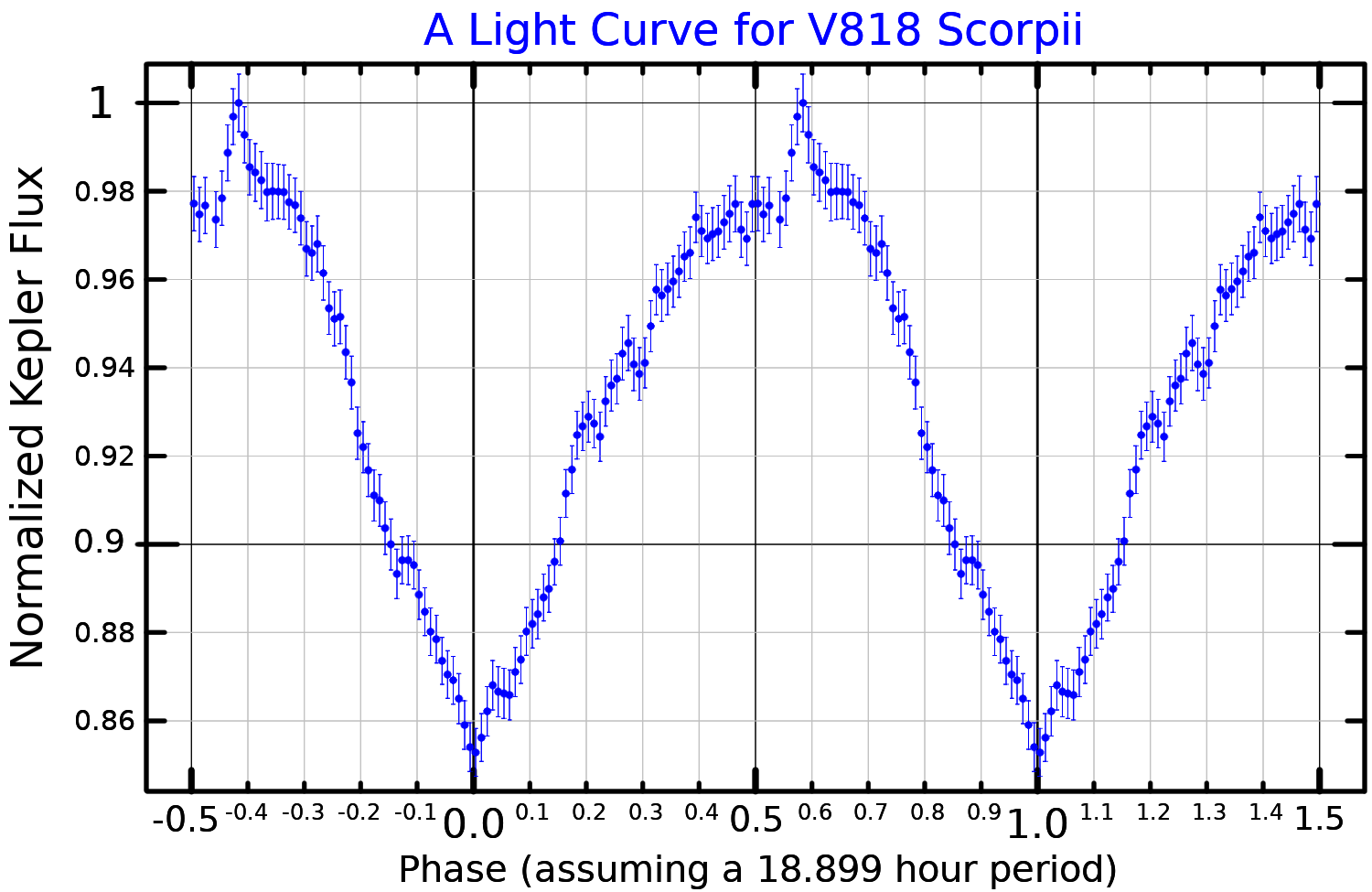
A broadband optical light curve for V818 Scorpii, adapted from Hynes et al. (2016)

Its X-ray output is 2.3×10^{31} W, about 60,000 times the total luminosity of the Sun. Scorpius X-1 shows regular variations of up to 1 magnitude in its intensity, with a period of around 18.9 hours. The source varies irregularly in optical wavelengths as well, but these changes are not correlated with the X-ray variations. Scorpius X-1 itself is a neutron star whose intense gravity draws material off its companion into an accretion disk, where it ultimately falls onto the surface, releasing a tremendous amount of energy. As this stellar material accelerates in Scorpius X-1's gravitational field, X-rays are emitted. The measured luminosity for Scorpius X-1 is consistent with a neutron star which is accreting matter at its Eddington limit.

This system is classified as a low-mass X-ray binary; the neutron star is roughly 1.4 solar masses, while the donor star is only 0.42 solar masses. The origin of the system is a matter of debate. There is evidence that the two stars were not born together; studies based on the reconstruction of the orbit of Sco X-1 suggest that the binary may have been formed by a close encounter inside a globular cluster. However, it is not clear how to reconcile this formation scenario with the circularisation of the binary's orbit.

== See also ==
- List of X-ray pulsars
