= Explorer 10 =

NASA satellite of the Explorer program

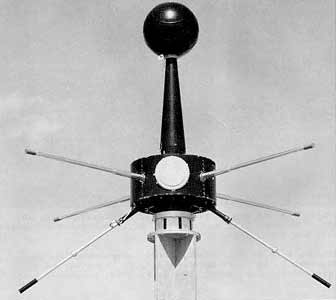
- Explorer 10 satellite
- Names: P-14; Explorer X
- Mission type: Space plasma physics
- Operator: NASA
- Harvard designation: 1961 Kappa 1
- COSPAR ID: 1961-010A
- SATCAT no.: 00098
- Mission duration: 52 hours (achieved)

Spacecraft properties
- Spacecraft: Explorer X
- Bus: P-14
- Manufacturer: Goddard Space Flight Center; Massachusetts Institute of Technology
- Launch mass: 35 kg (77 lb)

Start of mission
- Launch date: 25 March 1961, 15:17:04 GMT
- Rocket: Thor DM-19 Delta (Thor 295)
- Launch site: Cape Canaveral, LC-17A
- Contractor: Douglas Aircraft Company
- Entered service: 25 March 1961

End of mission
- Last contact: 27 March 1961
- Decay date: 30 June 1968

Orbital parameters
- Reference system: Geocentric orbit
- Regime: Highly elliptical orbit
- Perigee altitude: 221 km (137 mi)
- Apogee altitude: 180,100 km (111,900 mi)
- Inclination: 33.0°
- Period: 83.50 hours

Instruments
- Faraday Cup Plasma Probe; Rb-Vapor and Fluxgate Magnetometers; Sun-Moon-Earth Aspect Sensor (Spacecraft)

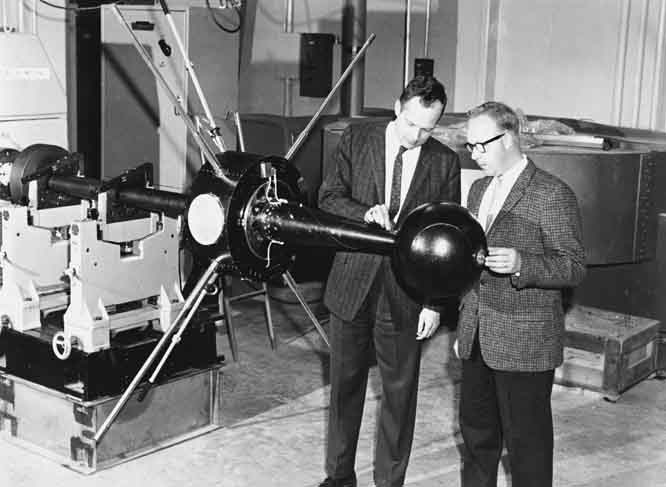
Explorer 10 inspection

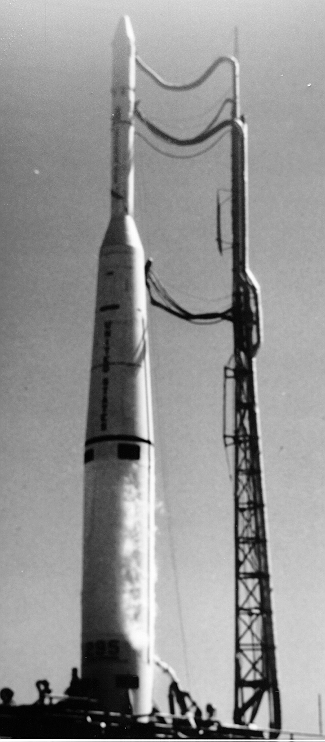
Thor DM-19 Delta (Thor 295) with Explorer 10 (Mar. 25, 1961)

Explorer 10 (also known as Explorer X or P14) was a NASA satellite that investigated Earth's magnetic field and nearby plasma. Launched on 25 March 1961, it was an early mission in the Explorer program and was the first satellite to measure the "shock wave" generated by a solar flare.

== Mission ==
The objective was to investigate the magnetic field and plasma as the spacecraft passed through Earth's magnetosphere and into cislunar space. The satellite was launched by a Thor DM-19 Delta (Thor 295) into a highly-elliptical orbit and was spin-stabilized with a spin period of 0.548 seconds. The direction of its spin vector was 71° right ascension and −15° declination.

== Spacecraft ==
Explorer 10 was a cylindrical, battery-powered spacecraft instrumented with two fluxgate magnetometers and one rubidium vapor magnetometer extending from the main spacecraft body, and a Faraday cup plasma probe. The magnetometers were produced by Goddard Space Flight Center, and the Massachusetts Institute of Technology (MIT) provided the plasma probe.

== Experiments ==
=== Faraday Cup Plasma Probe ===
This experiment consisted of a Faraday cup with four grids and a collector designed to provide data on the density of the solar plasma and the magnitude and direction of its bulk motion. Protons were measured in the following energy ranges: 0 to 5, 0 to 20, 0 to 80, 0 to 250, 0 to 800, and 0 to 2300 eV. The experiment was mounted on the spacecraft so that the symmetry axis of the plasma probe was perpendicular to the spacecraft spin axis. The Faraday cup had its maximum response to particles incident at 0° to its symmeter axis. The response fell off rapidly until the instrument had a zero response to particles coming in at 63° and greater to its normal. The effective area of collection for normal incidence was 28-cm^{2}. The instrument had two outputs: a DC component related to photoelectric effects and the plasma flux, and an AC component related only to the plasma flux. The shift in the frequency of the AC output component was encoded to be proportional to the plasma flux. The upper energy limit of the plasma particles generating the AC component was determined by the value of a positive retarding voltage applied to one of the grids. This "modulating voltage" had six possible values, from 5 to 2300 eV, and it could also be set to 0. During each 148-second telemetry sequence, 5 seconds were used by the plasma probe. These 5-second intervals, subcommutated by an interval program, were used to transmit sequentially a marker signal, the DC output of the instrument, and the AC output of the experiment at one of the six modulating voltages. Thus, a complete plasma probe sequence, consisting of eight telemetering cycles, lasted 19 minutes and 44 seconds. No inflight calibration was provided, and no onboard processing was done. Because of the limited lifetime of the spacecraft battery, only 52 hours of data were acquired. The principal investigator was Herbert S. Bridge from the Massachusetts Institute of Technology, who worked together with Bruno Rossi.

=== Rb-Vapor and Fluxgate Magnetometers ===
A dual gas rubidium alkali vapor instrument and two monaxial fluxgate magnetometers were designed to obtain vector magnetic field measurements of all three field components along a 1.8- to 42.6-Earth radii trajectory traversing the geomagnetic field and extending into the interplanetary medium. The fluxgate magnetometers were oriented at an angle of 57° 45' to the satellite spin axis and were placed on the ends of 79 cm (31 in) booms to reduce to less than 1 nT the possibility of spacecraft magnetic field contamination. Data were transmitted to ground stations in periods of 126 seconds from the rubidium magnetometer and 3 seconds for each of the fluxgate magnetometers, in sequence with the other experiment transmissions. Performance was excellent, and data were obtained for 52 hours. During launch, however, outgassing caused deposition of a film on the sphere containing the rubidium-vapor magnetometer. This increased the absorbency of the surface and raised the rubidium vapor magnetometer's temperature to 60°C after 2 hours in sunlight, which interrupted the continuous operation of the magnetometer at 18 Earth radii. Intermittent operation occurred for the next 6 hours and this permitted inflight vector calibration of the fluxgate magnetometers in weak fields.

=== Sun-Moon-Earth Aspect Sensor (Spacecraft) ===
The optical aspect sensor consisted of a Sun-Moon-Earth sensor and associated electronics. The Earth-Moon part of the sensor consisted of a fan field of vision, 3° wide and 120° long, which swept through the sky as the probe rotated in space. The appearance of the Moon or Earth in the sensor's field of view caused a step change in subcarrier frequency. The Sun part of the sensor consisted of a digital coded slit 2° wide and 100° long. The appearance of the Sun in the field of view of the slit caused a discrete frequency on the subcarrier which corresponded to the position of the Sun in the field of view.

== Results ==
Because of the limited life of the spacecraft batteries, the only useful data were transmitted in real-time for 52 hours on the ascending portion of the first orbit. The distance from the Earth when the last bit of useful information was transmitted was 42.3 Earth radii, and the local time at this point was 22:00 hours. All transmission ceased several hours later.

== See also ==
- Explorer program
