= Herbert S. Bridge =

American physicist

Herbert Sage Bridge
- Bridge in c. 1980
- Born: May 23, 1919; Berkeley, California, U.S.
- Died: August 30, 1995 (aged 76); Boston, Massachusetts, US
- Education: University of Maryland (BSc 1941), Massachusetts Institute of Technology (PhD 1950)
- Known for: spacecraft plasma science instruments
- Scientific career
- Fields: cosmic rays, space plasma physics
- Workplaces: Massachusetts Institute of Technology
- Thesis: Production of bursts by penetrating particles (1950)
- Doctoral advisor: Bruno Rossi

Herbert Sage Bridge (1919-1995) was an American physicist who developed the first instruments to measure plasma in interplanetary space and made significant contributions to cosmic ray research. He earned his PhD in physics from MIT in 1950 under Bruno Rossi's supervision after working on wartime projects at Princeton and Los Alamos Laboratory. His early research focused on cosmic rays. Beginning in 1958, Bridge developed the modulated-grid Faraday cup with Rossi, creating the first instrument capable of detecting dilute space plasma. The instrument flew aboard Explorer 10 in 1961 and was adapted for plasma science experiments on multiple spacecraft, including the Voyager program and Parker Solar Probe.

== Biography ==
Bridge was born in Berkeley, California, in 1919. He studied chemistry at the University of Maryland (BSc, 1941), and then worked at the National Defense Research Council Separation Project at Princeton and the Los Alamos Laboratory during the war. He got a PhD in physics from MIT, working on cosmic ray research under Bruno Rossi's supervision (1950) (before MIT, Bridge worked with Rossi at Los Alamos). He was a researcher at the MIT Laboratory for Nuclear Science, and became a professor there at 1966. In 1957, he went for a year to Switzerland, to work at CERN. He also worked at the Brookhaven National Laboratory. His research "focused on nuclear interactions produced by cosmic ray particles and on the new, unstable particles that result". Among his results was the "discovery of the positive K-meson and the cloud chamber observation of a cosmic-ray event interpreted tentatively as the annihilation of a heavy antiparticle". In 1965, he became an associate director of the MIT's Center for Space Research, became its director in 1978, and retired in 1984.

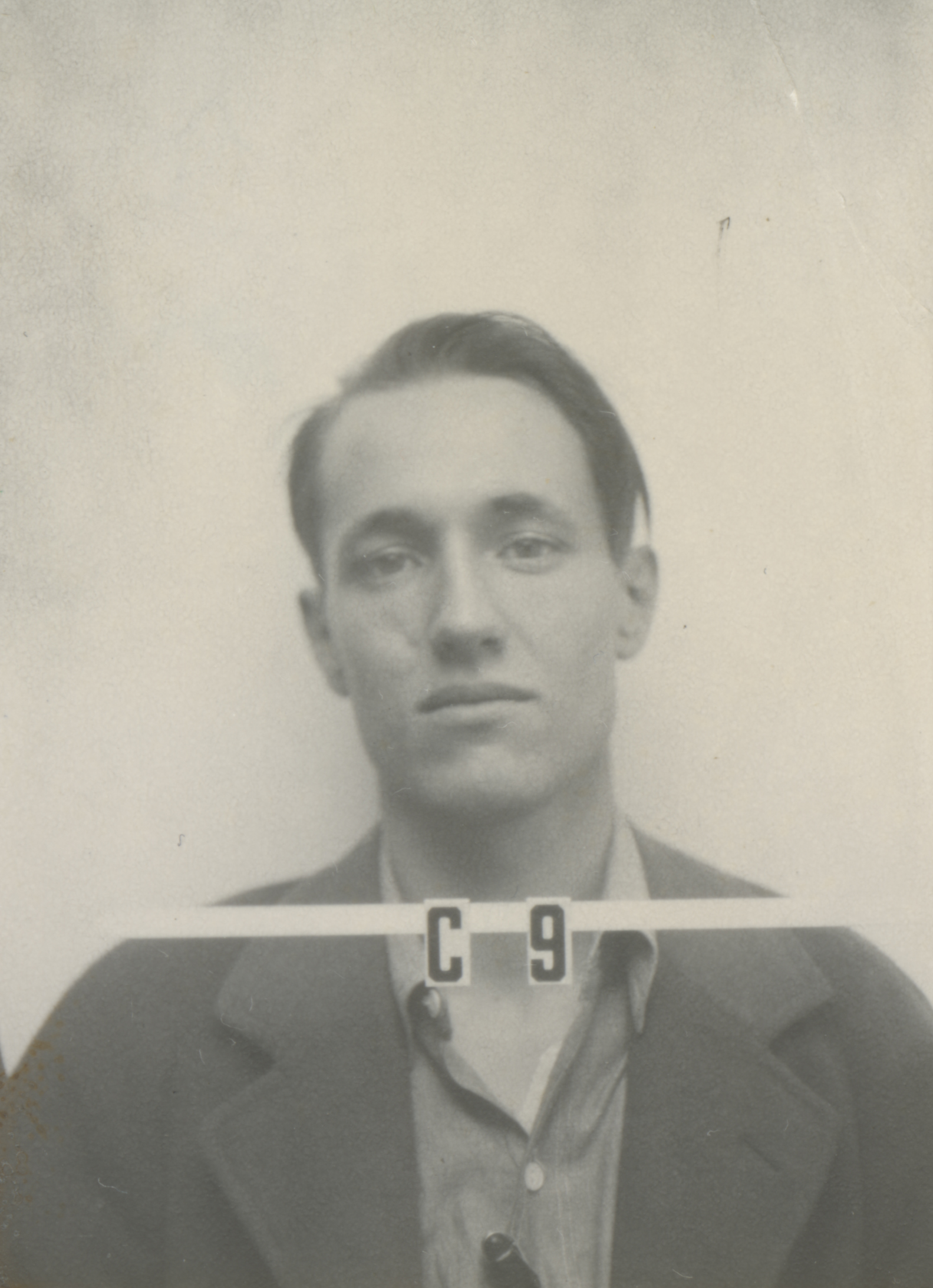
Herbert S. Bridge's Los Alamos badge

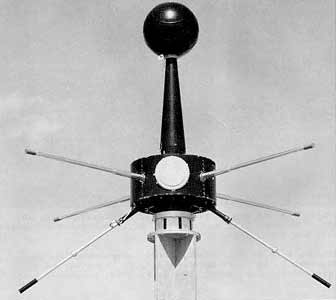
Explorer 10 satellite. The white circular cap covers the opening of the MIT Faraday cup.

Bridge started to work on space plasma in 1958; together with Rossi, he designed and tested a plasma probe based on the classical Faraday cup. To enhance the instrument's response to positively charged protons and to suppress its response to photoelectrons produced by sunlight, four grids were deployed within the cup. A key innovation was a modulating voltage applied to one of the grids, which converted the signal into an alternating current, proportional to the proton flux and uncontaminated by any contribution of photoelectrons.

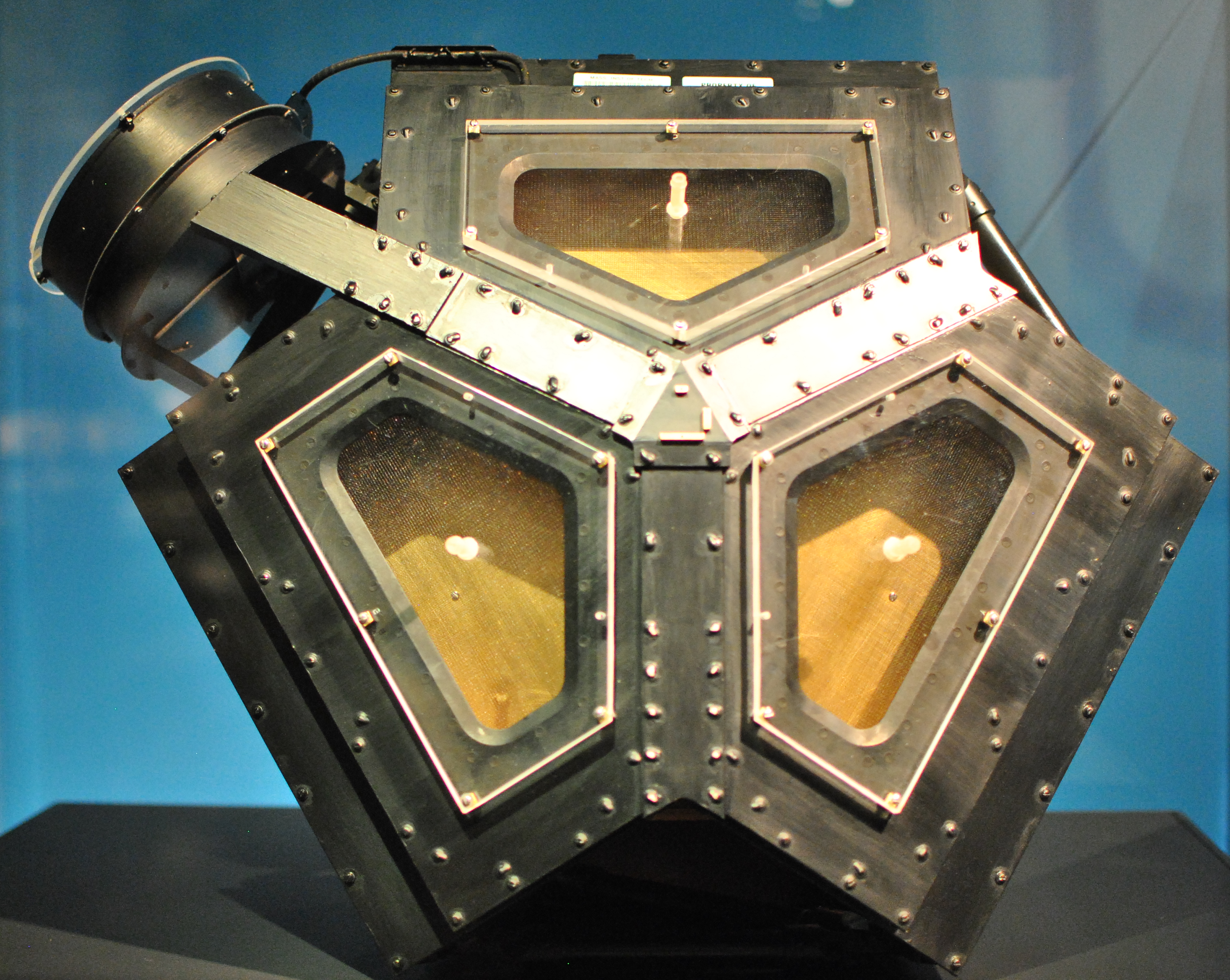
Voyager Plasma Science Experiment

The modulated-grid Faraday cup for the Explorer 10 (1961) was the first of Bridge's spacecraft instruments. It was the first instrument that detected dilute plasma in interplanetary space. It was further developed into Plasma Science Experiment for the Voyager program (1977) and Parker Solar Probe, among others. According to his colleague John W. Belcher, "Bridge was the principal investigator for plasma probes on spacecraft which visited the sun and every major planetary body in the solar system."

== Personal life ==
Bridge had two sons and a daughter. He enjoyed "cars, photography, mountaineering and the out-of-doors", and visited many high-altitude laboratories through his interest in cosmic rays and mountains.

== Awards ==
- member of the American Geophysical Society
- Fellow of the American Geophysical Union and the American Academy of Arts and Sciences
- member of Phi Beta Kappa
- 1974 NASA Exceptional Scientific Achievement Medal

== Selected publications ==
- Bridge, H. S.; Rossi, B. B. (1947). "Cosmic-ray bursts in an unshielded chamber and under one inch of lead at different altitudes". Physical Review. 71 (6): 379. Bibcode:1947PhRv...71..379B. doi:10.1103/PhysRev.71.379.2.
- Bridge, H. S.; Rossi, B. B. (1947). "Burst production by penetrating cosmic-ray particles". Physical Review. 72 (3): 257. Bibcode:1947PhRv...72..257B. doi:10.1103/PhysRev.72.257.2.
- Bridge, H. S.; Peyrou, C.; Rossi, B. B.; Safford, R. (1953). "Cloud chamber observations of the heavy charged unstable particles in cosmic rays". Physical Review. 90 (5): 921. Bibcode:1953PhRv...90..921B. doi:10.1103/PhysRev.90.921.
- Bridge, H. S. (1956). "Experimental results on charged K-mesons and hyperons, Chapter II". Progress in Cosmic Ray Physics, Vol. III. Amsterdam, Holland: North Holland Publishing Company.
- Bridge, H. S. (1960). "An instrument for the investigation of interplanetary plasma". Journal of Geophysical Research. 65 (10): 3053. Bibcode:1960JGR....65.3053B. doi:10.1029/JZ065i010p03053.
- Bridge, H. S.; Lazarus, A. J.; Lyon, E. F.; Rossi, B.; Scherb, F. (1962). "Plasma probe instrumentation on Explorer X". Journal of the Physical Society of Japan. 17 (Supplement A-III): 1113–1121.
- Bonetti, A.; Bridge, H. S.; Lazarus, A. J.; Lyon, E. F.; Rossi, B.; Scherb, F. (1963). W. Priester (ed.). Explorer X plasma measurements. Proceedings of the Third International Space Science Symposium, Space Research III. Amsterdam, the Netherlands: North-Holland Publ. Co. pp. 540–552.
- Bridge, H. S. (1963). "Plasmas in space". Physics Today. 16 (3): 31. Bibcode:1963PhT....16c..31B. doi:10.1063/1.3050802.
- Bridge, H. S.; Lazarus, A. J.; Snyder, C. W.; Smith, E. J.; Davis, Jr., L.; Coleman, Jr., P. J.; Jones, D. E. (1967). "Mariner V: Plasma and magnetic fields observed near Venus". Science. 158 (3809): 1669–1673. Bibcode:1967Sci...158.1669B. doi:10.1126/science.158.3809.1669. PMID 17749787.
- Bridge, H. S.; Lazarus, A. J.; Scudder, J. D.; Ogilvie, K. W.; Hartle, R. E.; Asbridge, J. R.; Bame, S. J.; Feldman, W. C.; Siscoe, G. L. (1974). "Observations at Venus encounter by the plasma science experiment on Mariner 10". Science. 183 (4131): 1293–1296. Bibcode:1974Sci...183.1293B. doi:10.1126/science.183.4131.1293. PMID 17791370.
- Ogilvie, K. W.; Scudder, J. D.; Hartle, R. E.; Siscoe, G. L.; Bridge, H. S.; Lazarus, A. J.; Asbridge, J. S.; Bame, S. J.; Yeates, C. M. (1974). "Observations at Mercury encounter by the plasma science experiment on Mariner 10". Science. 185 (4146): 145–151. Bibcode:1974Sci...185..145O. doi:10.1126/science.185.4146.145. PMID 17810507.
- Bridge, H. S.; Belcher, J. W.; Butler, R. J.; et al. (1977). "The plasma experiment on the 1977 Voyager mission". Space Science Reviews. 21 (3): 259–287. Bibcode:1977SSRv...21..259B. doi:10.1007/BF00211542.
- Bridge, H. S.; Belcher, J. W.; Lazarus, A. J.; Sullivan, J. D.; McNutt, Jr., R. L.; Bagenal, F.; Scudder, J. D.; Sittler, E. C.; Siscoe, G. L.; Vasyliunas, V. M.; Goertz, C. K.; Yeates, C. M. (1979). "Plasma observations near Jupiter: Initial results from Voyager 1". Science. 204 (4396): 987–991. Bibcode:1979Sci...204..987B. doi:10.1126/science.204.4396.987. PMID 17800436.
- Bridge, H. S.; Bagenal, F.; Belcher, J. W.; et al. (1982). "Plasma observations near Saturn: Initial results from Voyager 2". Science. 215 (4532): 563–570. Bibcode:1982Sci...215..563B. doi:10.1126/science.215.4532.563. PMID 17771279.
- Bridge, H. S.; Belcher, J. W.; Coppi, B. (1986). "Plasma Observations Near Uranus: Initial Results from Voyager 2". Science. 233 (4759): 89–93. Bibcode:1986Sci...233...89B. doi:10.1126/science.233.4759.89. PMID 17812895.
- Belcher, J. W.; Bridge, H. S.; Bagenal, F. (1989). "Plasma observations near Neptune: Initial results from Voyager 2". Science. 246 (4936): 1478–1483. Bibcode:1989Sci...246.1478B. doi:10.1126/science.246.4936.1478. PMID 17756003.
