= OSI Systems =

American electronics company

OSI Systems, Inc.
- Company type: Public
- Traded as: Nasdaq: OSIS; S&P 600 Component
- Industry: Semiconductors
- Founded: 1987; 39 years ago
- Headquarters: Hawthorne, California, U.S.
- Key people: Deepak Chopra (Executive Chairman of the Board of Directors); Ajay Mehra (CEO, Rapiscan Systems); Alan Edrick (EVP and CFO); Victor Sze (Company Secretary and General Counsel)
- Revenue: ▲US$958 million (FY 2015)
- Operating income: (US$119 million (FY 2018))
- Net income: ▲US$23.6 million (FY 2010)
- Website: www.osi-systems.com

OSI Systems, Inc. is an American company based in California that develops and markets security and inspection systems such as airport security X-ray machines and metal detectors, medical monitoring and anesthesia systems, and optoelectronic devices. As of June 2010, the company employs approximately 3,180 personnel globally and includes subsidiary companies Spacelabs Healthcare, Rapiscan Systems and OSI Optoelectronics.

== History ==
- 1987 OSI Systems, Inc. was founded (prior to May 1997 operated under the name “Opto Sensors, Inc.”)
- 1990 Acquired UDT Sensors, Inc.
- 1993 Acquired Rapiscan Security Products Limited
- 1993 Acquired Ferson Optics, Inc.
- 1994 Formed ECIL-Rapiscan Security Products Limited (partnership with Electronics Corporation Of India Limited)
- 1994 Formed Opto Sensors (Malaysia) Sdn. Bhd.
- 1997 Acquired Advanced Micro Electronics AS
- 1998 Acquired Osteometer MediTech A/S
- 1998 Purchased the security products business of Metorex International Oy
- 1998 Purchased a minority equity stake in Square One, Inc., (In 2000, acquired substantially all of Square One, Inc.’s assets)
- 1999 Acquired Aristo Medical Products, Inc.
- 1999 Formed OSI Medical, Inc.
- 2000 Formed RapiTec, Inc.
- 2001 Formed Dolphin Medical (merged OSI Medical, Inc. into Dolphin in March 2002)
- 2002 Acquired substantially all the assets of Thermo Centro Vision, Inc.,
- 2002 Purchased a minority equity interest in CXR Limited, (In December 2004 CXR Limited became a wholly owned subsidiary)
- 2002 Acquired all the outstanding capital stock of Ancore Corporation
- 2003 Acquired the military, laser-based training business of Schwartz Electro-Optics, Inc. (In November 2003, acquired substantially all remaining assets of Schwartz Electro-Optics, Inc.)
- 2003 Acquired substantially all of the assets of J&D Engineering (UK) Limited.
- 2004 Acquired Spacelabs Medical.
- 2005 Acquired Blease Medical Holdings Limited.
- 2006: OSI acquires Del Mar Reynolds, the British diagnostic cardiology company and adds it to the healthcare organization.
- 2011 Established new office in Hitech City in Hyderabad.
- 2016 The company offered $269 million to acquire American Science and Engineering, a US manufacturer of X-ray equipment.
- 2022 Establishes New State of the Art Factory of 50K sq. ft. near RG International Airport (RGIA), Hyderabad India specializing in manufacturing of medical devices
