= American Science and Engineering =

American x-ray equipment manufacturer

American Science and Engineering, Inc.
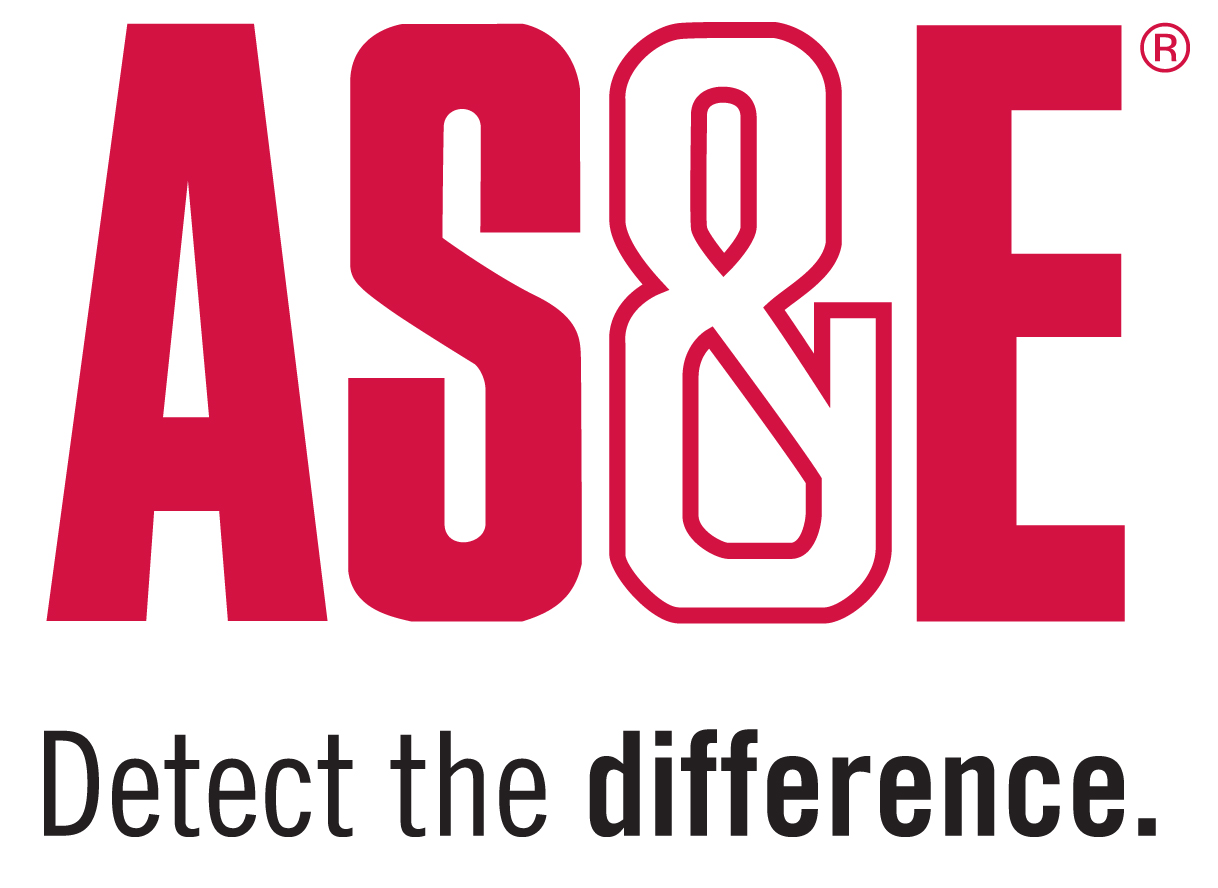
- Company type: Subsidiary
- Traded as: Nasdaq: ASEI
- Industry: Instrumentation
- Founded: 1958; 68 years ago
- Headquarters: Billerica, Massachusetts
- Revenue: $126.7 million (2015)
- Number of employees: 245
- Website: as-e.com

American Science and Engineering Inc., (AS&E) is an American manufacturer of advanced X-ray equipment and related technologies, founded in 1958 by Martin Annis, Ph.D. Annis asked George W. Clark to join him in starting his company. Their primary work in the beginning was as a developer for NASA. Annis brought on as Chairman of the Board of Directors, Bruno Rossi, Ph.D., of MIT to help guide their efforts. Rossi had earlier confirmed the existence of cosmic rays, and postulated that black holes would emit tremendous bursts of cosmic radiation as they swallowed celestial objects. At the urging of Rossi, Annis brought on board Riccardo Giacconi, from Italy, to work on the effort to develop a detector. As a consultant to American Science and Engineering, Inc., Rossi initiated the rocket experiments that discovered the first extra-solar source of X-rays, Scorpius X-1. Despite Rossi's pivotal discoveries and work in this area, in 2002 Richardo Giacconi alone won the Nobel Prize for its discovery and invention Nobel Prize in Physics. The AS&E team made possible the Einstein Observatory (equipped with the first full imaging X-ray telescope on board a satellite, launched in 1978). Throughout his tenure as president of AS&E (from its inception in 1958 until he left in 1993), Annis was a leading inventor/scientist for the company, including inventing the backscatter technology, which enabled the detection of plastic explosives, he also invented the body scanner, originally developed as a machine to detect contraband in/on people for prisons, but later adopted for use in airports. Body scanners are now standard as part of pre-boarding security screenings in airports around the world. AS&E also produced the first 4th generation CT scanner for commercial use in 1976.

The development of focusing optics for soft X-rays led also to rocket-borne solar observations, the later Skylab space station, and several successive solar observatory satellites (e.g., Yohkoh and Hinode). These observations enabled major steps forward in our understanding of the physics of the solar corona and of plasma astrophysics in general.

AS&E provides both transmission X-ray and backscatter X-ray, equipment for airports, seaports, critical infrastructures, border crossings and other locations where security scanning is required. AS&E has also developed a mobile backscatter X-ray van (ZBV).

In June 2016, OSI Systems offered to purchase the company for $269 million, After approval by regulators and shareholders, the deal competed before the end of 2016.

In the 12 months ending March 31, AS&E made $64 million profit on $278 million revenue.
