= David B. Nicodemus =

American physicist

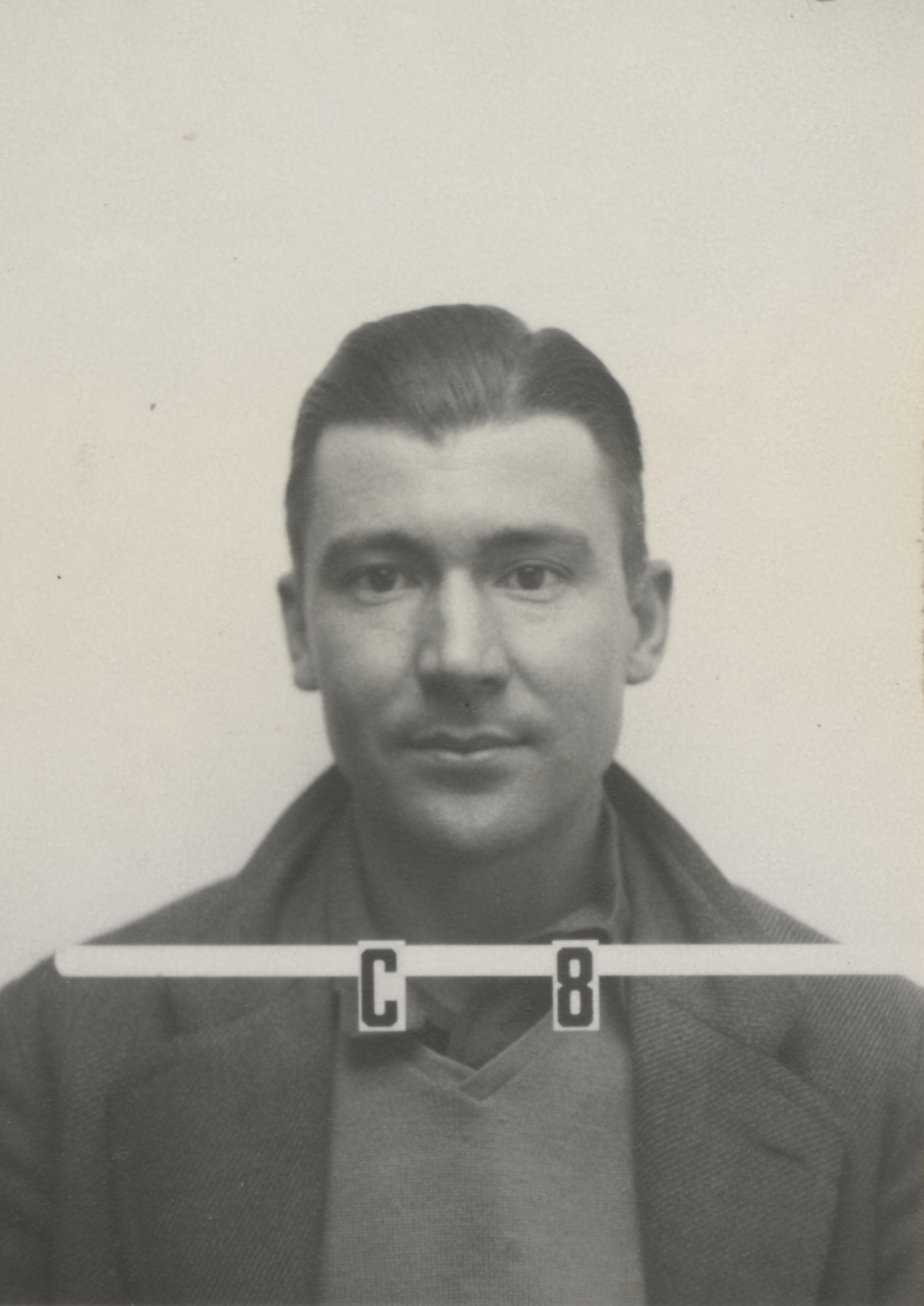
David Nicodemus Los Alamos badge

David Bowman Nicodemus (1 July 1916 – 19 June 1999) was a physicist, Physics Professor and Administrator at Oregon State University, and part of the Manhattan Project team.

== Life and times ==
David B. Nicodemus was born on 1 July 1916 in Kobe, Japan to Frederick B. Nicodemus of Forreston, Illinois and Ella N. Nicodemus of Highland, Illinois. His parents were missionaries. The family sailed from Hong Kong on 30 November 1916 aboard the S.S. Empress of Asia and arrived at the ports of Victoria and Vancouver in British Columbia, Canada on 18 December 1916. Nicodemus was 5 months old when he voyaged across the Pacific Ocean. The Nicodemus family disembarked in Vancouver, British Columbia. Residence in the U.S. was listed at Highland, Illinois.

In 1922 at the age of 6, Nicodemus entered the U.S. again, this time at San Francisco, California. Nicodemus had one brother, Frederick E. Nicodemus, born on 12 August 1911 in Osaka, Japan. The family sailed from Yokohama, Japan on the S.S. President Pierce departing on 18 November 1922 and arriving at San Francisco in December 1922. The family listed their address in the U.S. at 1205 Main Street in Highland, Illinois.

At the age of 14, on 8 July 1931, the family returned to the U.S. via Canada entry at Victoria, British Columbia from Manila, Philippines and sailed on the Empress of Canada.

== Education ==
In 1937, Nicodemus graduated from DePauw University at Greencastle, Indiana with a bachelor’s degree in physics. He attended Stanford University for graduate school, then became an instructor in the Stanford Physics Department. He went on to become assistant professor of physics at Oregon State College. In 1951, he received an outstanding and inspirational teaching award.

In 1946, he went back to Stanford University from Los Alamos to conduct physics research on the cyclotron and pursue studies for a Ph.D. in physics. In 1950, he completed his Ph.D. and was offered a faculty position in the physics department at Oregon State.

== Los Alamos ==
Nicodemus was a physicist at the Los Alamos Scientific Laboratory from 1943 to 1946. He went to Los Alamos from Stanford University with physicists Hans H. Staub and Felix Bloch. At Los Alamos, Nicodemus worked with several noteworthy physicists, including Felix Bloch, Bruno Rossi, Hans H. Staub, James H. Coon, and Jerome Fleeman. Nicodemus went to Los Alamos Scientific Laboratory to be part of the Manhattan Project team responsible for development of “The Gadget,” (the atomic bomb). In 1945, he witnessed the initial detonation of a nuclear device at Trinity.

== Oregon State University ==
- 1962, assistant dean, then acting dean, college of science
- 1966, appointed dean of faculty, until retirement in 1986

== Select students ==
At Stanford, Nicodemus advised Melvin J. Nielsen for his Master’s work involving single crystals and neutron polarization. At Oregon State, Nicodemus was the doctoral advisor for Curtis Gordon Chezem, who conducted significant research on uranium metals.

== Resolution of Sympathy ==
- President Williamson of Oregon State University (OSU) presented the following Resolution of Sympathy for approval before the Faculty Senate:

The Faculty Senate of Oregon State University wishes to recognize the long service of David Nicodemus who died this last June. Dave served as a faculty member in the Department of Physics and was known for his excellence in teaching. He served as Dean of the College of Science and as Dean of Faculty. It was through the leadership of Dean Nicodemus that the present system of faculty governance through a Faculty Senate was established. OSU remains deeply indebted to him for all that he gave to this institution over his nearly 50 years of service.

== Honors and awards ==
- Phi Kappa Phi, 1969-1970, Chapter President

=== Awards ===
- Loyd Carter Award for Outstanding and Inspirational Teaching in Science, 1951.
- Outstanding Teacher Award, 1956.
- Myrtlewood Gavel, Dean of Faculty Emeritus, 1986.

== Legacy ==
- Nicodemus Memorial Scholarships in Physics Endowment Fund.
- Nicodemus Study Abroad Scholarship.

== Publications ==
- Nicodemus, D. B. (1946). The Average X-Ray Energy Expended in Forming an Ion Pair in Argon. Thesis (Ph.D.) - Stanford University, 1946. Source: American Doctoral Dissertations, Source code: W1946. page: 0020.
- Fleeman, Jerome, Nicodemus, D. B., & Staub, Hans H. (1949). Neutron Polarization. Physical Review. 76(12): 1774.
- Meyerhof, W.E., Nicodemus, D.B., & Bloch, F. (January 1950). Polarization Effects of Scattered Neutrons. Physical Review. 80(1): 132.
- Meyerhof, W. E., & Nicodemus, D. B. (1951). Neutron Depolarization on Scattering from Carbon, Paraffin, and Phosphorus. Physical Review. 82(1): 5.
- Nicodemus, David B., & Staub, Hans H. (1953). Fission Neutron Spectrum of U 235. Physical Review. 89(6): 1288.
- Coon, J. H., Davis, R. W., Felthauser, H. E., & Nicodemus, D. B. (1958). Scattering of 14.5-MeV Neutrons by Complex Nuclei. Physical Review. 111(1): 250.
