= Kenneth Greisen =

American physicist, astrophysicist and astronomer

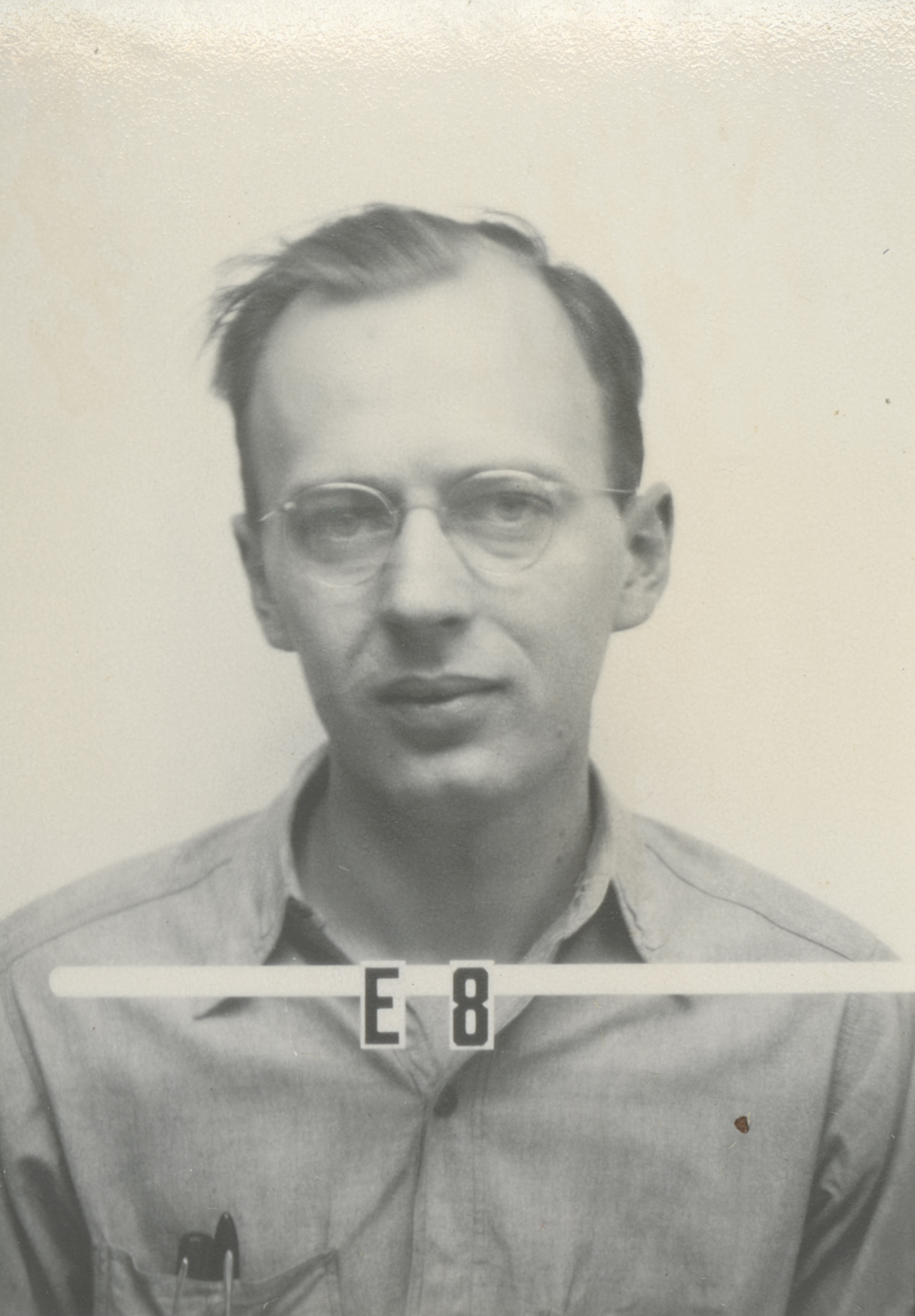
Greisen's photo on his security badge at Los Alamos

Kenneth Ingvard Greisen (24 January 1918 in Perth Amboy, New Jersey – 17 March 2007 in Ithaca, New York) was an American physicist who worked on nuclear physics and the astrophysics of cosmic rays and gamma radiation. "He will be most remembered for his realization that the cosmic microwave background limits the high-energy end of the spectrum of cosmic ray protons."

== Career ==
In 1938 Greisen graduated with a B.S. from Franklin & Marshall College. In 1942 Greisen earned his PhD in physics at Cornell University under Bruno Rossi with thesis Intensity of cosmic rays at low altitude and the origin of the soft component. He worked on the Manhattan Project from 1943 to 1946 in Los Alamos, where he was a group leader. In 1945 he was an eyewitness to the Trinity test as a member of the detonation team. After his Los Alamos work, he returned to Cornell University in 1946 as an assistant professor of physics. From 1975 he was a professor of astronomy and from 1976 to 1979 chair of the astronomy department and from 1978 to 1983 dean of faculty. In 1986 he retired as professor emeritus. From 1975 to 1981 he was adjunct professor at the University of Utah.

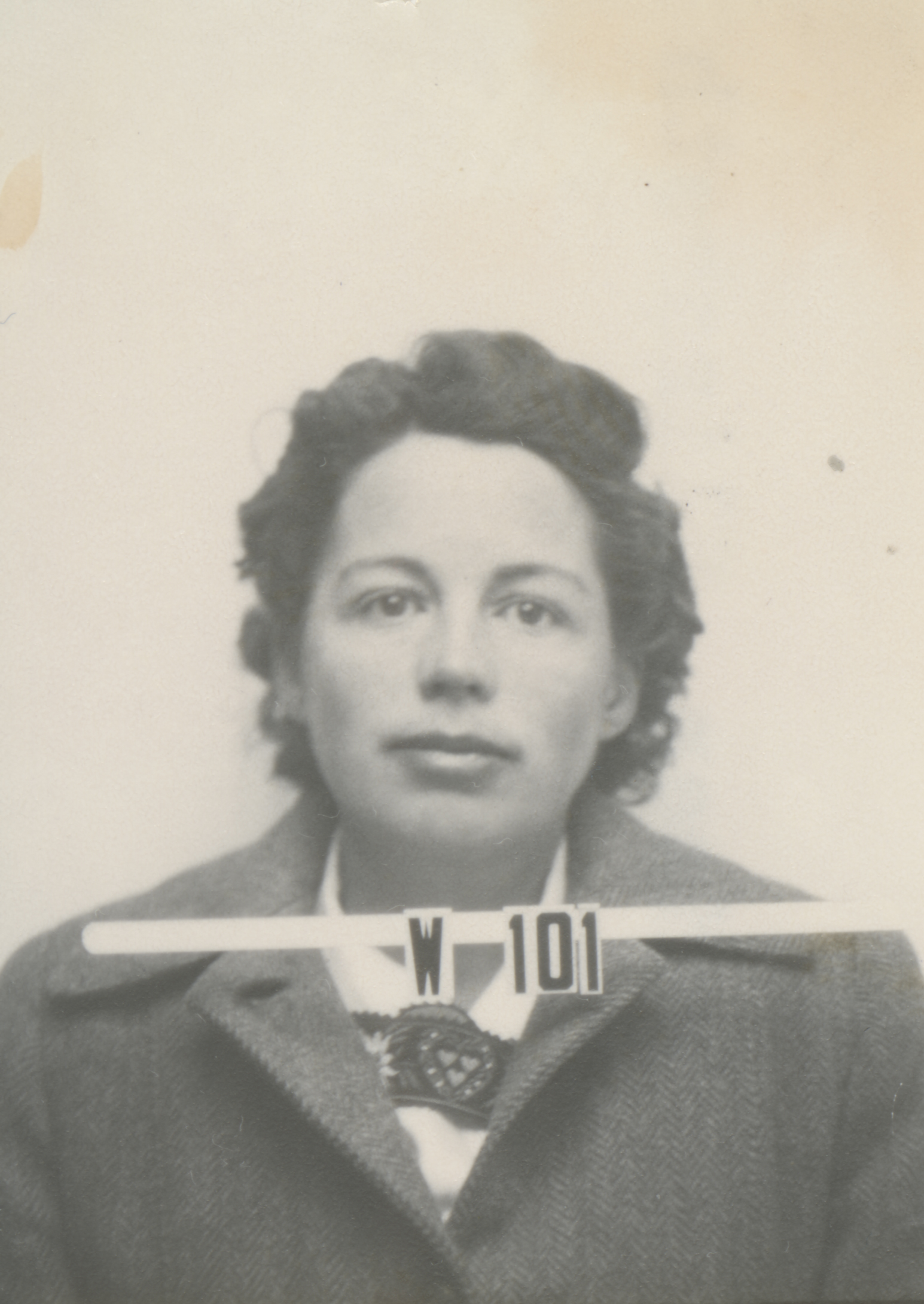
Elizabeth Greisen's Los Alamos badge

His wife, Elizabeth, also worked on the Manhattan Project.

Greisen did experiments on cosmic ray- and gamma ray-astronomy using high-altitude balloons. In 1971 he and his colleagues discovered pulsed gamma rays with energies greater than 200 MeV from the pulsar in the Crab Nebula. In 1966 he published the theory of the GZK cutoff, independently of the Russians Georgiy Zatsepin and Vadim Kuzmin who in 1966 also published their version of the same theory.

In 1966 he joined the AAS. In 1969 he was one of the founders of the Section for High Energy Astrophysics Division of the AAS and, in 1970 and 1971, was the first chair of this division. At Cornell University in 1969 he led a group of faculty members who modernized the university's physics curriculum.

In 1974 he was elected to the U.S. National Academy of Sciences.

== Greisen's PhD thesis ==
Rossi and Greisen built an apparatus, centered around a Geiger-Müller counter, to distinguish the altitude dependence of hard (mesotron, i.e. muon) and soft (electron) cosmic ray secondaries. The goal of Rossi and Greisen was to confirm that the lifetimes of the muons depended upon their energy as predicted by the theory of special relativity. The data presented in Greisen's thesis was taken at altitudes of 249,1616, 3240, and 4300 meters at Echo Lake, Colorado. Greisen's thesis work was cited many times over the ensuing decades.

== Trinity test eyewitness ==
"From 1943 to 1946 Greisen was a member of the group of physicists who worked on the Manhattan Project at Los Alamos. As one of the leaders of the denotation team, he was an observer at the Trinity test on 16 July 1945. His eyewitness report of that world-changing event is an important historical document. His comment "My God! It worked!" was typical of him."

== Works ==
- with Bruno Rossi: Rossi, Bruno; Greisen, Kenneth (1941). "Cosmic-ray theory". Reviews of Modern Physics. 13 (4): 240–309. Bibcode:1941RvMP...13..240R. doi:10.1103/RevModPhys.13.240.
- Greisen, Kenneth (1966). "End of the cosmic-ray spectrum?". Physical Review Letters. 16 (17): 748–750. Bibcode:1966PhRvL..16..748G. doi:10.1103/PhysRevLett.16.748. (GZK-Cutoff)
