= Marjorie Townsend =

American electrical engineer (1930–2015)

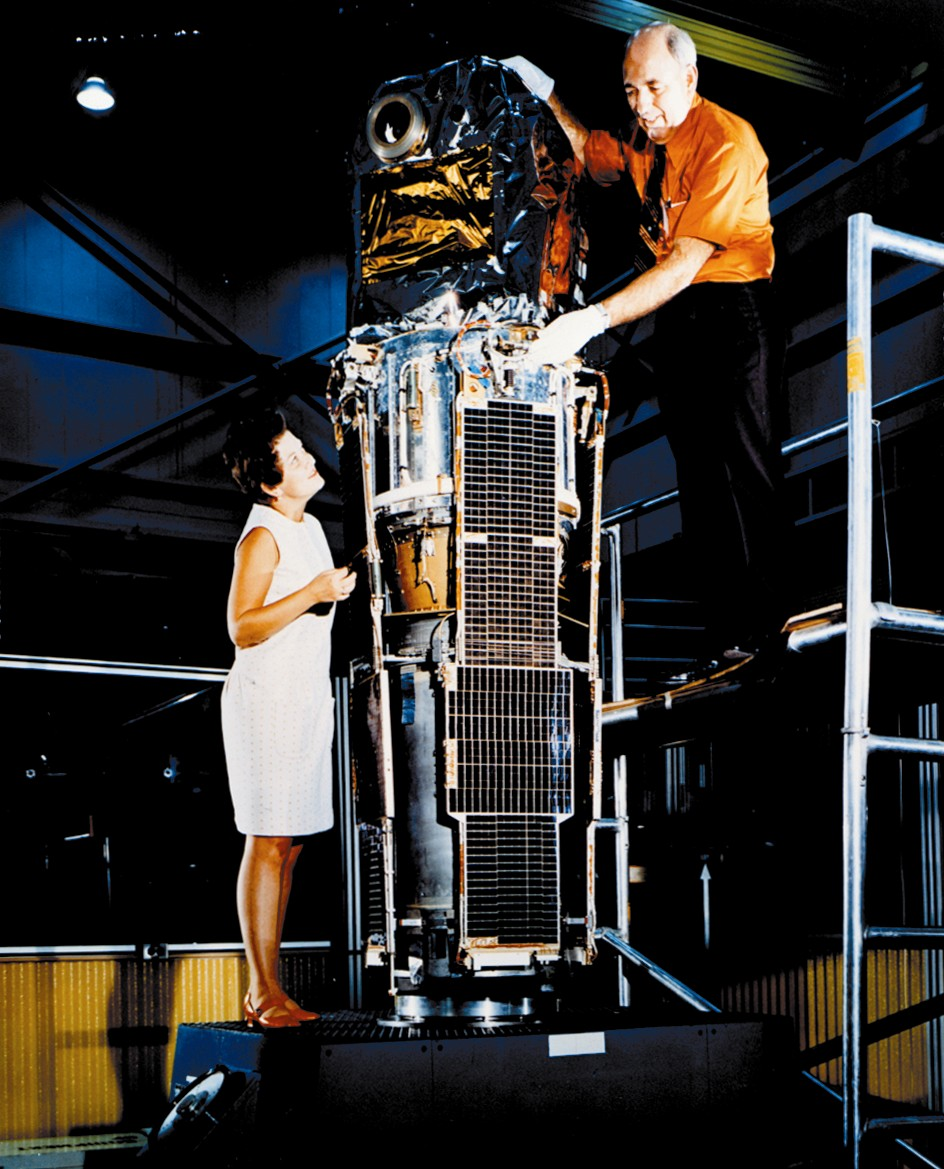
- Townsend and Bruno Rossi with the X-Ray Explorer Satellite, 1970
- Born: Marjorie Trees Rhodes; March 12, 1930; Washington, D.C.
- Died: April 4, 2015 (aged 85); Washington, D.C.
- Education: George Washington University
- Known for: First woman to manage a NASA spacecraft launch
- Spouse: Charles E. Townsend Sr.
- Scientific career
- Fields: Electrical engineer

Marjorie Trees Townsend (née Rhodes; March 12, 1930 – April 4, 2015) was an American electrical engineer, and the first woman to manage a spacecraft launch for NASA.

== Early life and education ==
Marjorie Trees Rhodes was born in Washington, D. C. At age 15 she started college, and was the first woman to earn an engineering degree from George Washington University when she graduated in 1951.

== Career ==
Early in her career, Townsend worked for the National Institute of Standards and Technology, and at the Naval Research Laboratory. She joined NASA in 1959. Her early work there involved weather satellites such as TIROS-1 and Nimbus. In time she was the first woman to become a spacecraft project manager at Goddard Spaceflight Center, responsible for Uhuru, the first satellite designed for x-ray astronomy. It was also the first American spacecraft to be launched from outside the United States, in 1970.

She worked with Bruno Rossi and Nobel laureate Riccardo Giacconi on the Small Astronomy Satellite program, and went to Kenya when Uhuru was launched by the Italian space program from the San Marco platform there.

Townsend retired from NASA in 1980, having received the Exceptional Service Medal and Outstanding Leadership Medal for her work. After that, she served as director of space systems engineering for BDM International, and was vice president at Space America. She retired from her private-sector work in 1996.

Townsend was co-inventor of a digital telemetry system, patented in 1968, which was part of the Nimbus program weather satellite.

== Honors and professional service ==
Marjorie Townsend was president of the Washington Academy of Sciences. She was a fellow of the Institute of Electrical and Electronics Engineers, and chaired a local chapter of the American Institute of Aeronautics and Astronautics. In 1972 she was named a Knight of the Italian Republic Order for her work on Uhuru. She was named a Distinguished Alumnus of George Washington University in 1976. In 2006 she was inducted into the Engineering Hall of Fame at her alma mater.

== Personal life and legacy ==
Marjorie Rhodes married Charles E. Townsend Sr., a medical student, in 1948. The couple had four sons together, and lived in the Cleveland Park neighborhood of Washington DC. Marjorie was widowed in 2001.

The Marjorie Rhodes Townsend Papers are held in the Special Collections library at Virginia Polytechnic Institute and State University.
