= Spacelabs Healthcare =

American medical equipment manufacturer

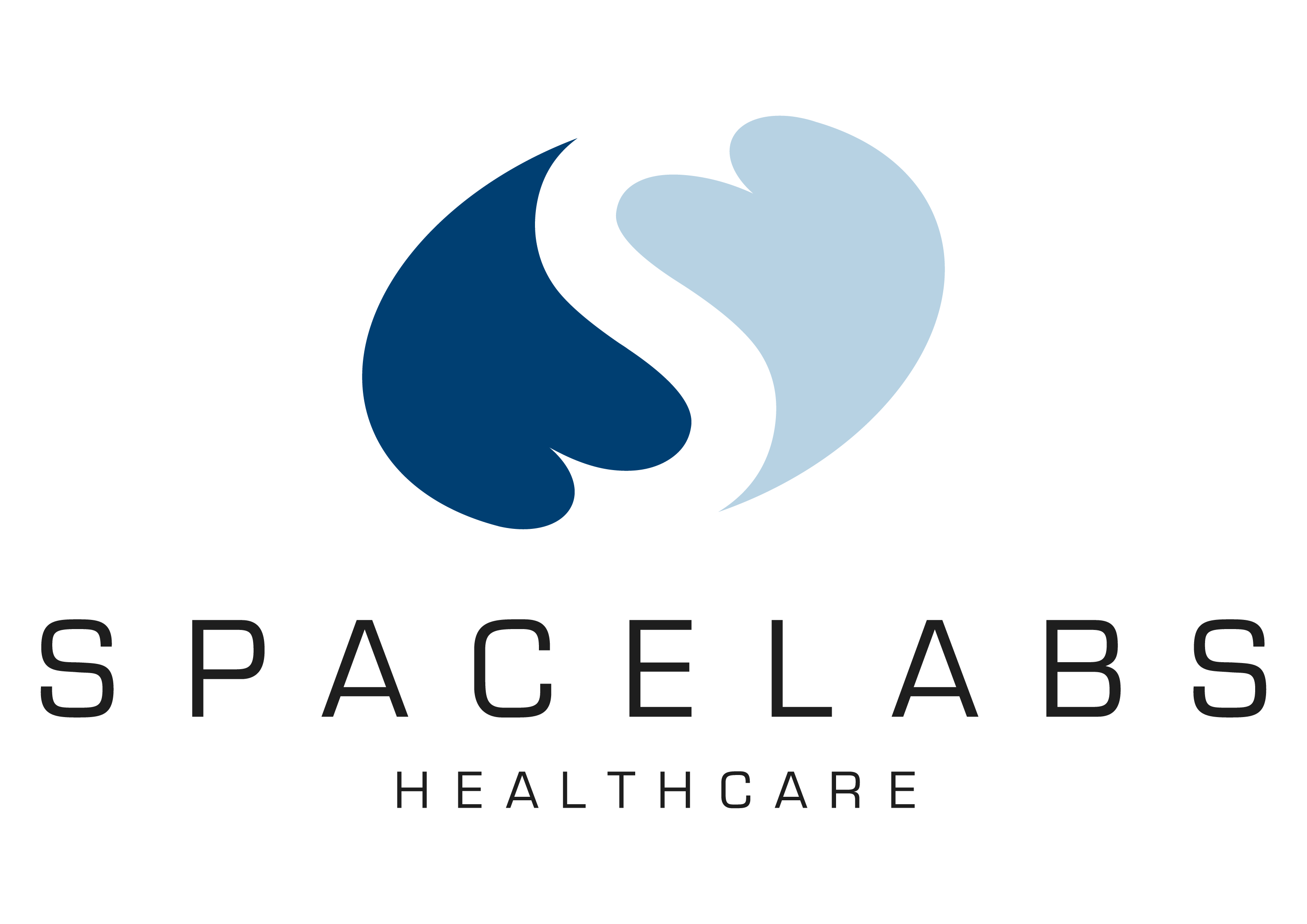
- Type: Subsidiary of OSI Systems, Inc. (NASDAQ.com)
- Industry: Medical Device Manufacturer
- Founded: California (1958)
- Headquarters: Snoqualmie, Washington
- Key people: Wilson Constantine (President); Ajay Mehra (CEO); Alan Edrick (CFO)
- Products: Patient monitoring, diagnostic cardiology products, clinical software, IT Solutions
- Number of employees: 1,043 (2013)
- Website: www.spacelabshealthcare.com

Spacelabs Healthcare is an American manufacturer of medical equipment and is a wholly owned subsidiary of OSI Systems (Nasdaq: OSIS) of Hawthorne, California. It offers products and services from two divisions: patient monitoring and connectivity and diagnostic cardiology. The company is headquartered in Snoqualmie, WA and employs over one thousand people around the world.

== History ==
Spacelabs was founded in 1958 by two scientists to develop cardiac monitoring and telemetry systems for NASA to monitor astronauts' vital signs in the early space missions. They developed wireless vital signs monitoring for both Gemini and Apollo astronauts.

The company went on to develop sophisticated medical monitoring systems with some significant 'firsts', resulting in them becoming one of the top US manufacturers in the 1980s.

Spacelabs has had several owners. These include Squibb through Westmark, Instrumentarium Corporation, and indirectly GE Medical during the GE acquisition of Instrumentarium. They are currently owned by OSI Systems.

Subsequently, the company has made several acquisitions to expand its portfolio by adding diagnostic cardiology and anesthesia products, thus forming 'Spacelabs Healthcare' in 2005.

== Key dates ==
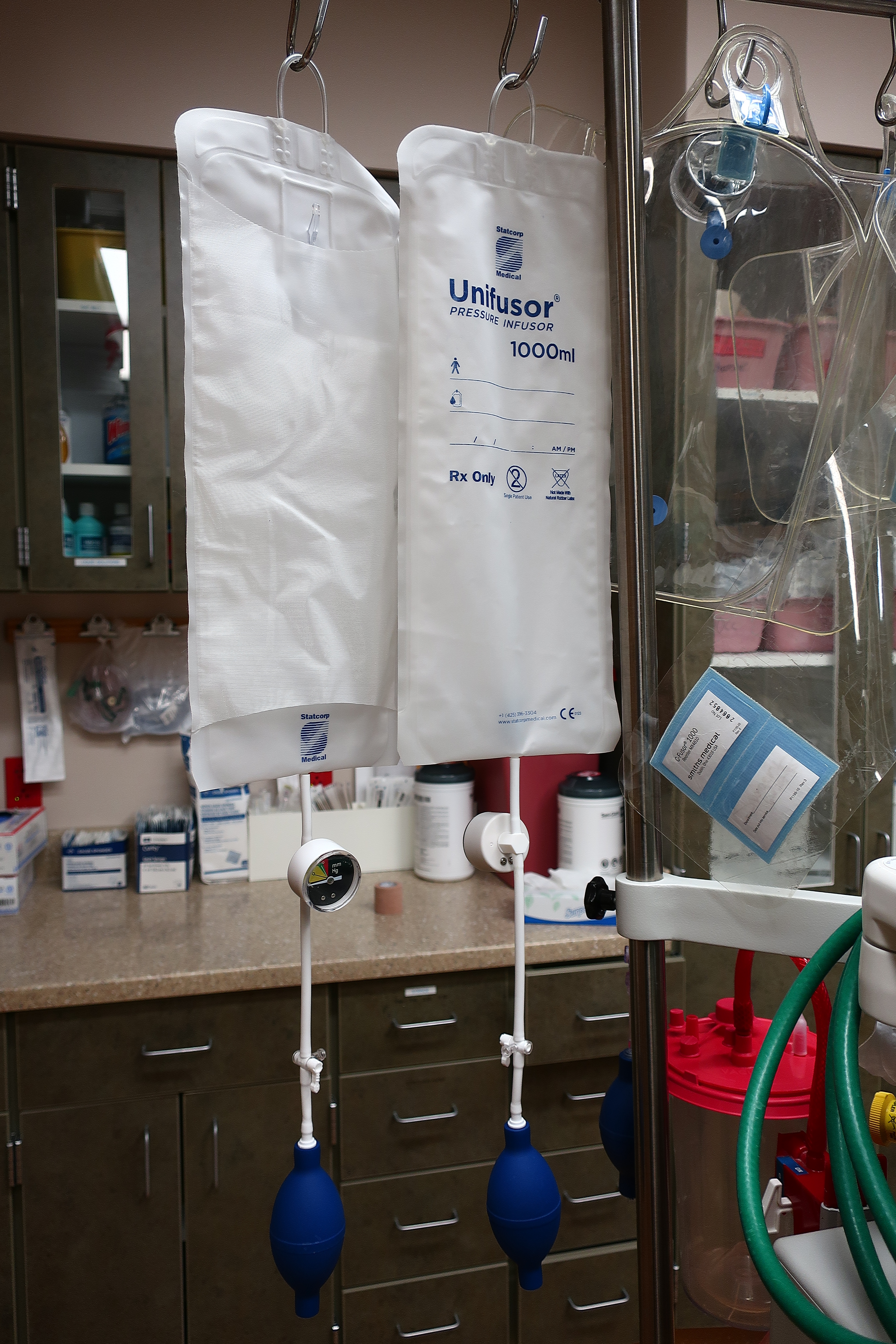
A Statcorp Medical 1000 ml Unifusor pressure infuser

- 1958: Ben Ettelson and James A Reeves founded Spacelabs to collaborate with NASA working to develop systems to monitor astronauts’ vital signs.
- 1965: Astronauts James McDivitt and Edward White wear Spacelabs' telemetry systems to monitor their temperature, respiration and heart rate during the Gemini IV space mission.
- 1968: Spacelabs introduces the first ICU and CCU monitoring systems.
- 1969: Neil Armstrong steps on the moon wearing Spacelabs wireless vital signs monitoring.(see external link 1 below)
- 1974: Spacelabs launches the first monitoring system to incorporate microprocessor technology.
- 1980: Squibb acquires Spacelabs.
- 1986: Spacelabs becomes part of Squibb Corp.'s Westmark International Inc.
- 1992: Westmark spins off Spacelabs, which then begins trading on NASDAQ under the name Spacelabs Medical.
- 1995: Spacelabs purchases Consolidated Peritronics Medical, Inc.
- 1997: The company acquires Burdick and Advanced Medical Systems.
- 1998: Spacelabs acquires exclusive rights to market and distribute Medical Insight R & D's anesthesia delivery system and launches the Ultraview care network.
- 2001: Spacelabs sells its headquarters building in Redmond, Washington, but leases it back.
- 2002: Spacelabs is acquired by Instrumentarium, Finland's largest medical equipment manufacturer, and is merged with its medical division Datex-Ohmeda.
- 2002: Spacelabs moves its headquarters to Issaquah, Washington.
- 2002: GE Medical Systems purchases Instrumentarium in the same year on the proviso that Spacelabs is divested to comply with the monopolies commission; Quinton Cardiology Systems buys Burdick from Spacelabs.
- 2004: OSI acquires Spacelabs from Instrumentarium.
- 2005: OSI acquires Blease, the British anesthesia equipment manufacturer.
- 2005: Spacelabs Medical and Blease Medical are merged into one new company, Spacelabs Healthcare.
- 2006: OSI acquires Del Mar Reynolds, the British diagnostic cardiology company and adds it to the healthcare organization.
- 2013: Spacelabs Healthcare moves from Issaquah and purchases new headquarters in Snoqualmie, Washington.
- 2014: OSI acquires Metrax GMBH (Primedic), a German defibrillator company and adds it to the healthcare organization.
- 2015: Statcorp Medical, a US non invasive blood pressure cuff and pressure infusor manufacturer, already owned by OSI is integrated in to Spacelabs Healthcare
- 2017: OSI sells Metrax GMBH to Chinese company Yuwell-Jiangsu Yuyue medical equipment & supply Co.
- 2018: Spacelabs Healthcare invests $720,000 into University of Massachusetts Amherst's Nursing Laboratory.
- 2019: Spacelabs Healthcare ends the production and sale of its entire Anesthesia product line. End of Support (EOS) date is set as 30 June 2026
- 2020: Spacelabs Healthcare acquires BoxView, LLC.
- 2020: Spacelabs Healthcare Inducted into Space Technology Hall of Fame
- 2023: Spacelabs Healthcare expands clinical informatics capabilities with acquisition of predictive analytics company PeraHealth
