= George W. Clark =

American astronomer (1928–2023)

George Whipple Clark (August 31, 1928 – April 6, 2023) was an American astronomer and professor emeritus at the Massachusetts Institute of Technology. When he retired, M.I.T. described him as "a central figure in the development of high-energy astrophysics, particularly in the design, analysis, and interpretation of experiments for the study of high-energy cosmic ray particles and the celestial sources of gamma rays and X-rays."

== Biography ==
He was born in Harvey, Illinois in 1928 to Robert Keep Clark and Margaret Whipple Clark. He was the nephew of acclaimed pancreatic surgeon Allen O. Whipple.

Clark received a bachelor's degree from Harvard University in 1949 and a Ph.D. from M.I.T. in 1952.

He was a member of the M.I.T. Physics faculty for 44 years, from his appointment as Instructor in 1952, Assistant Professor in 1954, Professor in 1965, and in 1985 Breene M. Kerr Professor of Physics, until he retired in 1996. From then until 1998, he held a term appointment as Professor. He is currently continuing his research at the MIT Kavli Institute for Astrophysics and Space Research.

In the 1950s Clark worked with Bruno Rossi and other collaborators on several large cosmic ray air shower experiments that used the novel methods of density sampling and fast timing to measure the energy spectrum of the primary cosmic rays to 1 billion billion (10^18) electron volts and to determine the distribution of their celestial arrival directions.

In 1962 he was awarded Fulbright and Guggenheim Fellowships. In 1991, he received the M.I.T. School of Science Teaching Prize for his work over many years as the faculty member in charge of Physics 8.13-14 (Experimental Physics).

He received the NASA Exceptional Scientific Achievement Award for his work with Claude R. Canizares on the Focal Plane Crystal Spectrometer experiment on the Einstein X-Ray Observatory. He was a principal scientist for satellite experiments that resulted in the discovery of high-energy gamma rays from galactic and extra-galactic sources. His pioneering work in the use of balloon-borne instrumentation for observing celestial X-ray sources discovered high energy X-rays from the Crab Nebula. Clark was the Principal Investigator for the MIT X-Ray Observatory on the Third Small Astronomy Satellite. He continued his work with observations from the Chandra X-ray Observatory.

Clark was a member of the American Academy of Arts and Sciences and the National Academy of Sciences.

Clark died from pancreatic cancer on April 6, 2023 in Boston. He was 94.
