= Claude R. Canizares =

American physicist

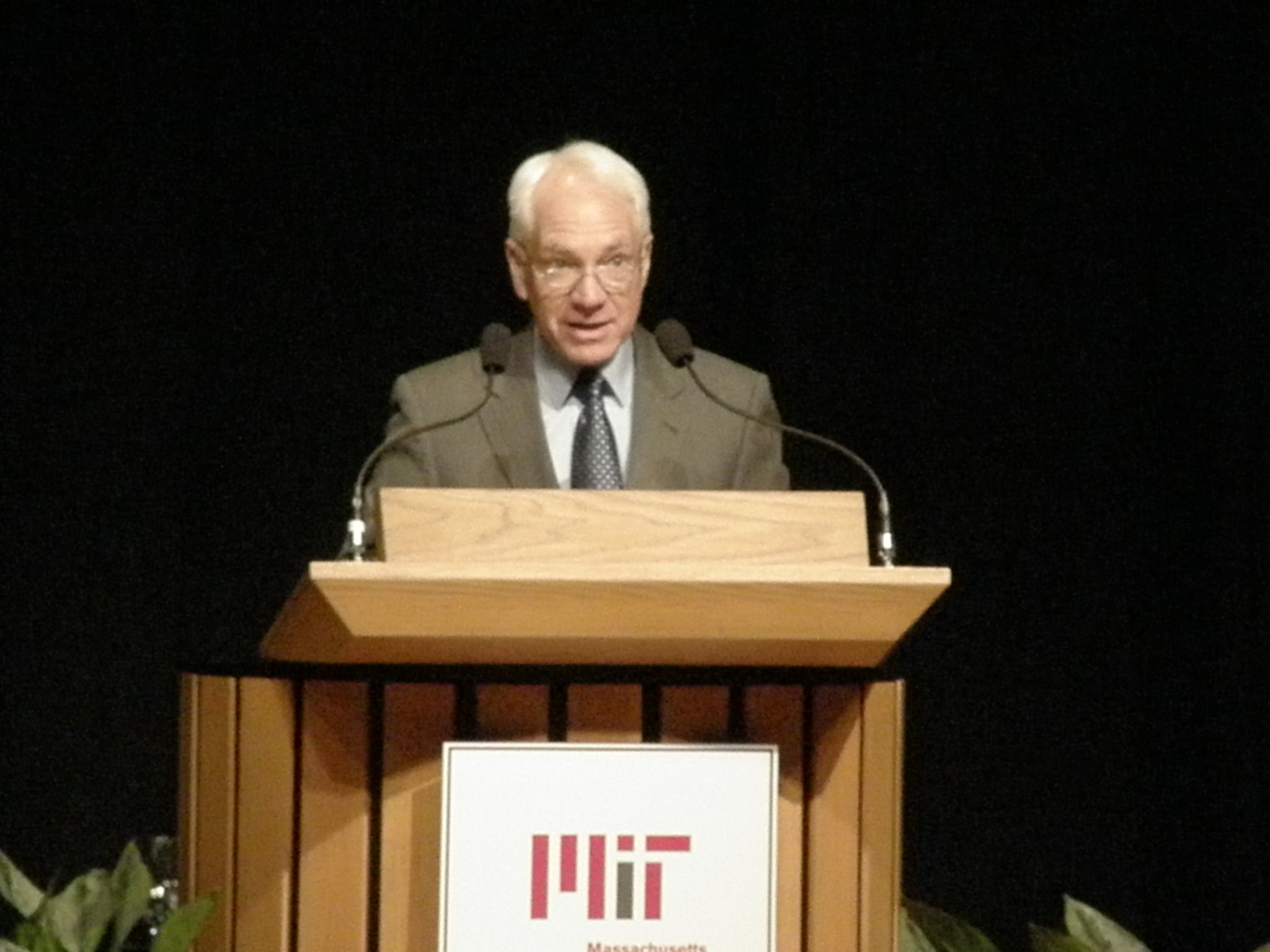
Claude R. Canizares

Claude R. Canizares is an American physicist who stepped down June 30, 2015 from his post as Vice President of the Massachusetts Institute of Technology. He remains the Bruno Rossi Professor of Physics at MIT and associate director for MIT of the Chandra X-Ray Observatory Center.

== Academic career ==
Canizares earned his B.A., M.A. and Ph.D. degrees in physics from Harvard University. He came to MIT as a postdoctoral fellow in 1971 and joined the physics faculty in 1974. In 1984, he was made a full professor.

From 1990 to 2002, Canizares was the director of MIT's Center for Space Research (now known as the MIT Kavli Institute for Astrophysics and Space Research). In 2002, he was appointed associate provost and vice president for research. He left the associate provostship and VPR positions to become VP in 2013.

Canizares is also the principal investigator for the Chandra X-ray Observatory's High Resolution Transmission Grating Spectrometer instrument.

He was elected a Fellow of the American Physical Society in 1989 for "pioneering investigations in x-ray astrophysics, particularly in the analysis of astrophysical plasmas by high-resolution x-ray spectroscopy"

== Selected publications ==
Canizares is the author or co-author of more than 170 scientific papers.

- "Simulating the X-ray Forest"

T Fang, GL Bryan, and C.R. Canizares
ApJ 564, 604 (2002)

- "The High Resolution X-ray Spectrum of SS 433 using the Chandra HETGS"

H.L Marshall, C.R. Canizares and N.S. Schulz
ApJ 564, 941-952 (2002)

- "A High Resolution X-ray Image of the Jet in M 87"

H.L. Marshall, B.P. Miller, D.S. Davis, E.S. Perlman, M. Wise, C.R. Canizares, D.E. Harris, J.A. Biretta
ApJ 564, 683-687 (2002)

- "Resolving the Composite Fe K-alpha Emission Line in the Galactic Black Hole Cygnus X-1 with Chandra"

J.M. Miller, A.C. Fabian, R. Wijnands, R.A. Remillard, P. Wojdowski, N.S. Schulz, T. Di Matteo, H.L. Marshall, C.R. Canizares, D. Pooley, W.H.G. Lewin
ApJ submitted, February 2002.

- "High Resolution X-Ray Spectroscopy of the Multiphase Interstellar Medium toward Cyg X-2"

Y.Yao, N.S. Shulz, M.F. Gu, M.A. Nowak and C.R. Canizares
ApJ 696, (2) 1418-1430 (2009)

- ""X-ray Emission and Corona of the Young Intermediate Mass Binary θ^{1} Ori E."

D.P. Huenemoerder, N.S. Schulz, P. Testa, A.Kesich, C.R. Canizares
ApJ 707, 942-953 (2009)

- "Confirmation of X-Ray Absorption by WHIM in the Sculptor Wall"

T.Fang, D.A. Buote, P.J. Humphrey, C.R. Canizares, L. Zappacosta, R.Maiolino
ApJ 714, 1715-1724 (2010)
