= Pryke =

Pryke is a surname. Notable people with the surname include:

- Anne Pryke, Jersey politician
- Clement Pryke (born 1968), English-American physicist
- Paula Pryke (born 1960), British florist and author
- Richard Pryke, British sound engineer
- Roger Pryke (1921–2009), Reforming priest, social activist, civil servant
- Sarah Pryke, behavioral and evolutionary ecologist

== See also ==
- Pryke baronets
