= Roger Pryke =

Australian Catholic priest, psychologist and social activist

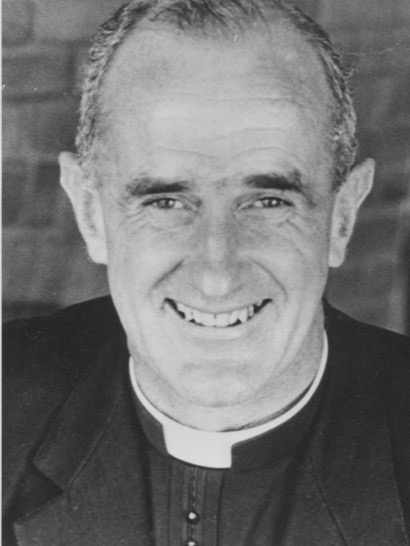
- Born: Roger Irving Pryke; 12 February 1921; Goulburn, NSW, Australia
- Died: 28 June 2009 (aged 87); Mosman, NSW, Australia
- Education: St Joseph's College, Hunters Hill, NSW St Columba's College, Springwood NSW; Propaganda Fide College, Rome; St Patrick's College, Manly NSW University of Sydney
- Alma mater: Sydney University
- Occupations: priest, parole officer administration officer
- Employer(s): Catholic Church, Australia; NSW Department of Corrective Services
- Known for: intellectual and spiritual leadership reform of the Catholic church (Vatican II); Practice of the corporal works of mercy Social Justice - Opposition to Vietnam War; Opposition to South African apartheid Improvements: NSW Corrective Services Commission.
- Spouse: Margaret Gilchrist (m. 1973)

Ecclesiastical career
- Religion: Christianity
- Church: Roman Catholic Church
- Ordained: 22 July 1944
- Congregations: St. Benedict’s Parish Church, Broadway; St. Joseph’s Church, Camperdown

Roger Irving Pryke (12 February 1921 – 28 June 2009) was a scholar, Catholic priest, psychologist, and social activist who left an indelible impression on the Australian Catholic community and on the broader Australian community. As a priest he was a knowledgeable precursor, and later exponent, of the reforms of the Second Vatican Council. As a preacher, lecturer and personal counsellor he was acknowledged as "(changing) thousands of people's lives" and influencing those thousands into "(becoming) a new kind of Catholic". As a personal guide to many, he applied the principles of psychology to the enrichment of the Christian life to great effect. His compelling social conscience led to his public involvement in issues such as apartheid in South Africa, the Vietnam War, and within the Church community, a leadership role and deep involvement, inter alia, in the reform of the Catholic Liturgy.

In 1972 he left the priesthood and married but still maintained a significant influence among Catholics and the general public until his retirement in 1995. Alzheimer's disease followed until his death in 2009.

== Early life and preparation for the priesthood ==
=== Schooling and formation ===
Roger Pryke was born in Goulburn, New South Wales on 12 February 1921, the son of Emily and Edwin Pryke. When he was five years old, his family moved to Coogee, then Clovelly, beachside suburbs of Sydney. He attended primary school there, where he received his early education by the Sisters of St. Joseph (Brown Josephites).

He was inordinately and unusually devout for his age. From the age of eight he worried about the religious issues of sin and the "state of grace". From this time in his life into the latter years of primary school he attended daily Mass and Communion - no easy discipline as the church was a kilometre and a half walk from where he lived.

In his first year of secondary school he attended the Marist Brothers school at Randwick. The following year (1934) when he was thirteen, he won a bursary as a boarder to St Joseph's College, Hunters Hill, also run by the Marist Brothers. At the end of 1937 “Pryke completed his Leaving Certificate brilliantly at St Josephs’s College”.

=== Initial training for the priesthood ===
Following this Catholic education in a devout Catholic family, in 1938 aged 17, Pryke commenced his studies for the priesthood at St. Columba's College in Springwood in the Blue Mountains of NSW.

Seven months later he was one of a specially selected group to study at Propaganda Fide College in Rome. While in Rome he became exposed to the ferment of ideas and movement for reform, typified by the theologian Yves Congar, ideas which later led to the Second Vatican Council. He continued his studies in Rome from October 1938 until June 1940.

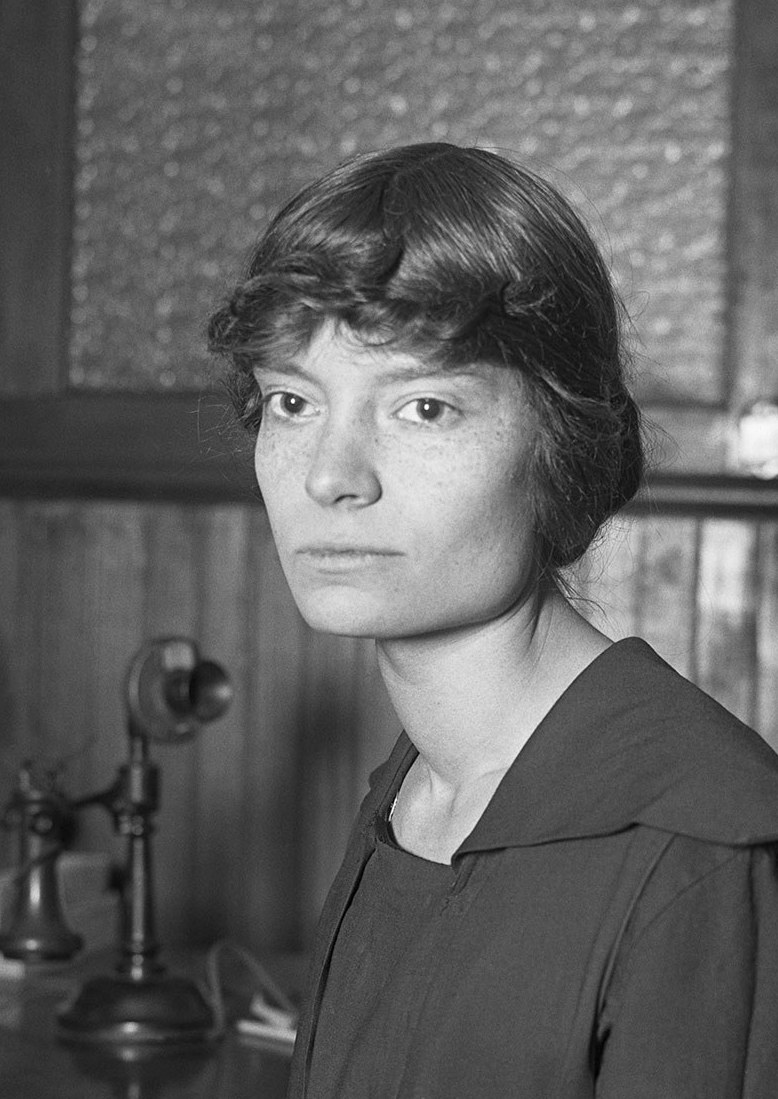
Dorothy Day, 1916

=== Escape from the war in Italy ===
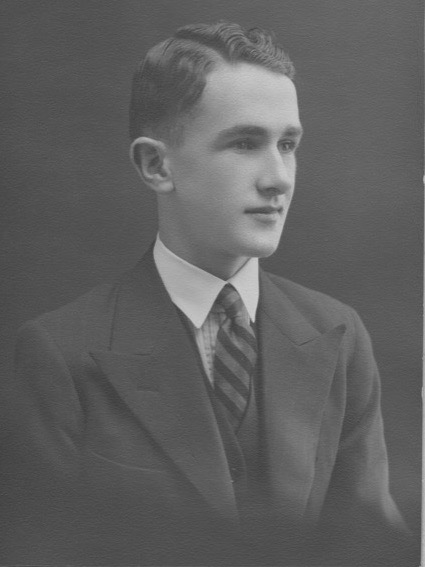
Roger Pryke as a young man

On the eve of the declaration of war on the Allies by the fascist dictator Benito Mussolini, Pryke was advised to leave Rome.

With a group of fellow students from Rome, the group made their way by train to Genoa where they boarded the ship, The Manhattan, bound for New York.

The group of students arrived in New York where they became involved with, and influenced by, the Dorothy Day House of Hospitality and the Catholic Worker Movement. This experience had a deep and indelible effect on Roger Pryke and his companions because they recognised that feeding the homeless, campaigning for justice and living by the corporal works of mercy were the most authentic expression of Catholicism and Christianity they had experienced.

Five of the group - Roger Pryke, Guilford Young, Vincent Butler, John Heffey and Kevin Shanahan - purchased a large second hand Buick car in New York and proceeded to drive across America visiting houses of hospitality, communal farms and various Catholic institutions. They received a special welcome at St John's Benedictine Abbey in Minnesota under the inspiring leadership of the liturgist, Godfrey Diekman. They proceeded to the west coast where, they boarded a ship RMS Aorangi back to Australia.

=== Preparation for the priesthood continued ===
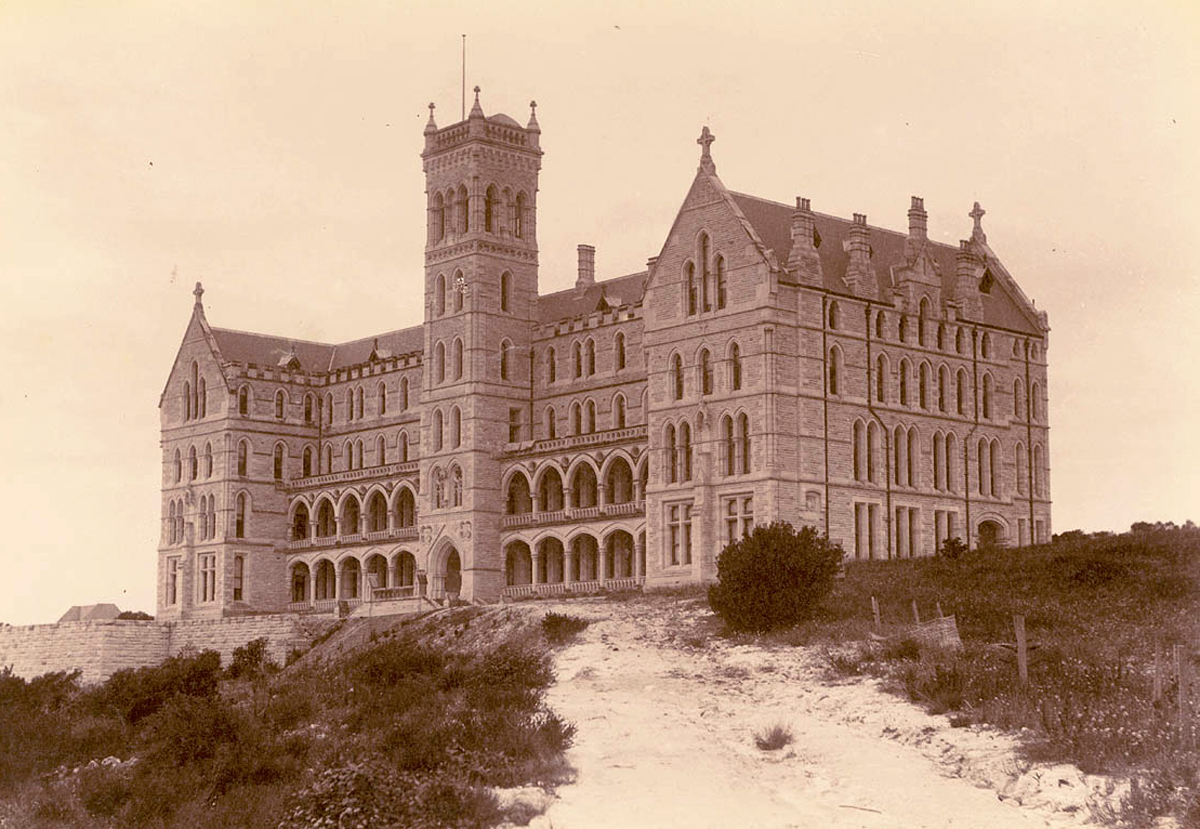
St. Patrick's College in 1900

Pryke returned to St. Columba's Seminary in Springwood for a short period before commencing his final four years of preparation for the priesthood at St Patrick's College, Manly. The oppressive and “backward” atmosphere at Manly dispirited him. He wrote to his father, “(I find) a dead theology, a dead liturgy and precious little action.”.

Nevertheless, he persevered and was ordained a priest in St Mary's Cathedral in Sydney on 22 July 1944. He spent several months as a curate in the inner city parish of Newtown.

== The Apostolic Delegation ==
Recognising his above average intellect, his experience in Rome and his fluency in Latin and Italian, Roger Pryke became an obvious choice to fill a need at the office of the Apostolic Delegate. The newly ordained priest spent four years in the Delegation office. He was awarded the Cross Pro Ecclesia et Pontifice for excellent work.

== Secretary to Cardinal Gilroy ==
Early in 1949,Cardinal Norman Gilroy withdrew Roger Pryke from the Apostolic Delegation to a position of “second” secretary to the Cardinal at St Mary's Cathedral, a position he endured to the end of 1950. He was often taken aback by the Cardinal's excessive and often irrational frugality, which the senior priests had to “work around” to receive the normal necessities of living.

== Chaplain to the University of Sydney ==
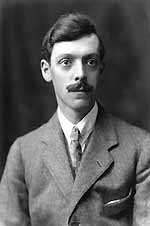
Professor John Anderson, atheist and libertarian

While still working for the Cardinal, and intending to give himself a break from soul-destroying administrative duties, Roger Pryke enrolled in a Bachelor of Arts degree at Sydney University.

Early in 1951, alarmed at the influence of the atheist and libertarian Professor John Anderson at the University of Sydney, Gilroy was advised that he should appoint a chaplain to the students at the university. At the time Pryke was thirty years of age, sophisticated, "tall, athletic, and urbane". As a travelled, educated, intellectually accomplished and current student, he was an obvious appointment. He was therefore domiciled, with part time duties, at the nearby St. Benedict's Parish Church in Broadway. From this base he became chaplain to the 1000 Catholic university students and to many others in the 9000 total student population.

He was immediately confronted with issues regarding the Movement under the leadership of B. A. Santamaria. The militantly anti-communist movement consisted of Catholics who met secretly to plan effective influence over the trade unions and the Australian Labor Party. In the context of the university, Paul Ormonde writes:

By 1951 the Movement controlled the Student Representative Council (SRC), the student newspaper Honi Soit, the Students’ Union, most of the lively faculty groups. These included the Medical Society and the Science Society, and, not surprisingly, the Catholic students organisation – the Newman Society.

Pryke immediately had reservations about its methodology and developed a nuanced approach to its existence. He preferred to encourage and advise the students as individuals to allow their Christianity to enrich their own personal spirituality and character.

The Movement people at the University did not know how to assess Father Pryke. ... He was an unusual priest. He had an open unfettered, tolerant approach to religion, which did not fit the Movement's style. He had a warm, straight-from-the-shoulder personality. His bush-Australian style hid a sharp intellect, which attracted many students to him, Catholic and non-Catholic, left wing and right wing.

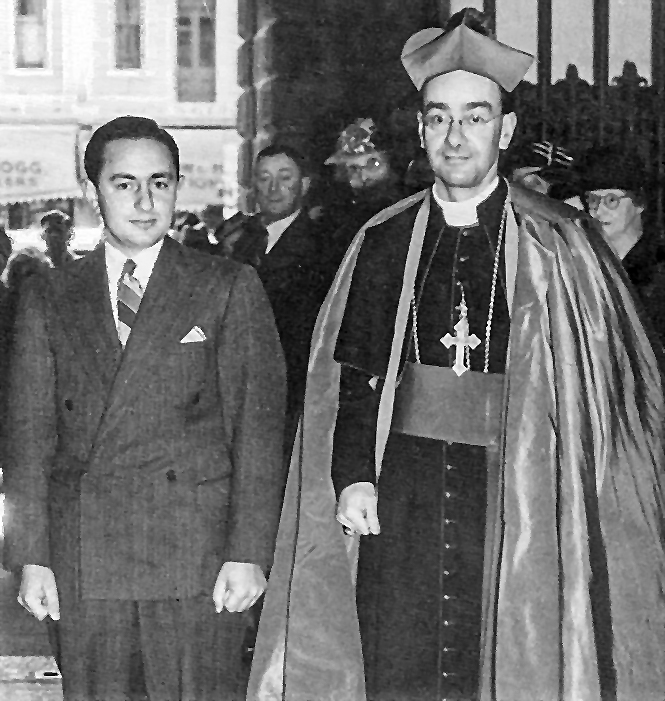
A young B.A. Santamaria with Bishop Matthew Beovich at the first Catholic Action meeting-1943

In 1955 Roger Pryke had attained his Bachelor of Arts Degree with honours, majoring in psychology. Pryke's understanding of psychology merged with his understanding of Catholicism and Christianity - a radical change at the time. In his conversations, talks and sermons he encouraged his connections to work on psychological balance.

- He advocated facing reality with courage as a means of preserving a healthy sanity.
- He taught his constituency that sanity depends the esteem of significant others.
- He explained the importance of making meaningful and mutually supportive friendships.
- He encouraged forgiveness and a loving attitude to others.
- He highlighted the research which showed how cruelty by one person to another is the basis for much mental illness.
- He preached the development of a personal and social conscience and how this often demands practical, peaceful and effective action in the wider community.

His knowledge of what constitutes a healthy sexuality and the value of intimacy, while very helpful to others, also exacerbated angst regarding his own obligation of celibacy.

== New opportunities: the living Church ==
In 1955, Cardinal Gilroy appointed him as parish priest of St.Joseph's, Camperdown - somewhat closer to the university, and a venue which enabled him to continue his university work, but which also provided new opportunities.

== The feminist educator ==
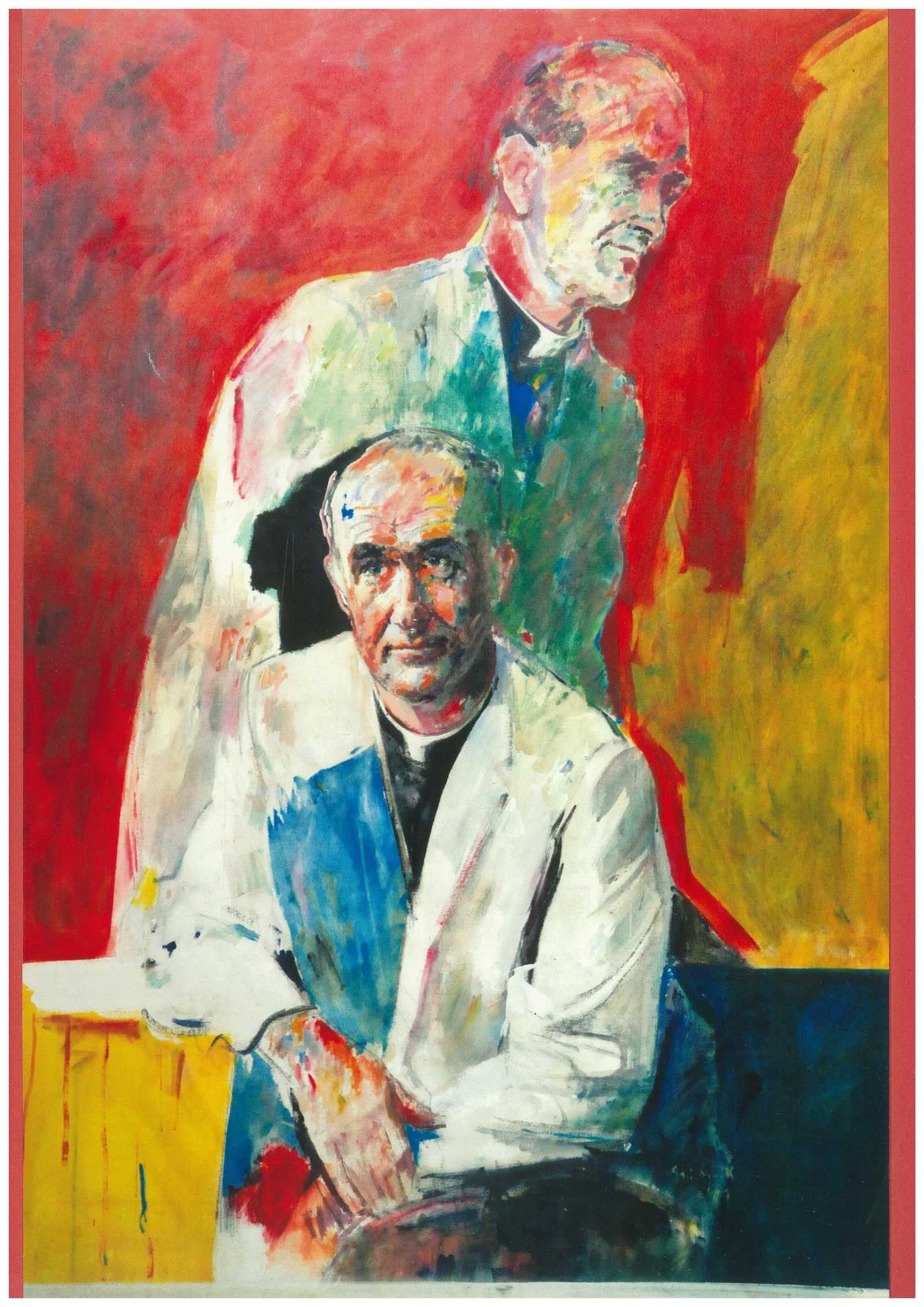
Roger Pryke painting by Eric Smith

Within the male dominated Catholic Church, Pryke's next initiative would, in later times, have earned him the title of “feminist”. He recognised that Catholic nuns did the most valuable work in the Church, yet received least recognition and attention. He considered that the Catholic community needed to know about the exciting changes being discussed throughout the Catholic world, and more than anyone else, the nuns deserved to be informed and educated.

Pryke put together a course of study modelled on the structure of learning at the Manly seminary. He assembled a team of the “best and brightest” of his contemporaries to assist him. They included Bede Heather, Grove Johnson, Kevin Walsh, Brian Crittenden, and Ted Kennedy. With this team he created a series of lectures and discussion sessions for nuns of all religious orders held at nearby Sancta Sophia College. The priests involved in the project communicated many new ideas, which portended the coming reforms of the Second Vatican Council, but they were couched within the parameters of traditional Catholic theology. The titles included references to the Trinity, the Incarnation, and Salvation history, which helped convince Cardinal Gilroy and his bishops that Pryke and his colleagues were not stepping over the line.

== A living Church ==
While this was happening Roger Pryke was asked by a young Fr. Tony Newman to assist him in his ideal of injecting life into the liturgical ceremonies of the Church. Pryke wholeheartedly agreed with Newman that liturgical reform was necessary to “breathe life” into the “hidebound” Church of the 1950s. Within a relatively short time the reformers had introduced the Dialogue Mass, wherein the congregation participated in the liturgical responses normally uttered by altar boys. This limited liturgical change was highly successful.

By far the most successful initiative was the publishing of The Living Parish Hymn Book, which contained traditional hymns as well as some more contemporary new hymns composed by the poet James McAuley, and set to the music of Richard Connolly. The sales of the Hymnal, described as “sensational”, overwhelmed Pryke and Newman, bringing in a million and a half dollars in revenue and requiring a business infrastructure.

By 1958-59 Pryke's over generous giving of himself to the chaplaincy of the university, the parishioners of Camperdown, the delighted nuns of the Sydney Archdiocese, as well as coping with the success of The Living Parish Hymn Book were becoming too much for him. He was heading for a personal crisis. To escape the pressure he sought leave from the Cardinal to approve a trip to Europe and further study in the Vatican. He received permission and arrived in Europe in September 1960. Arriving in Rome he entered an atmosphere of ferment which was preparatory to the Second Vatican Council (1962–1965). His experience turned out to be much more exciting, stimulating and productive than he expected. He left Rome and returned to Australia in July 1962.

== Clash with authorities ==
=== Chaplaincy terminated; lectures cancelled ===
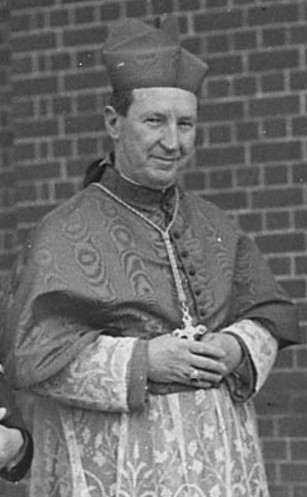
Cardinal Gilroy in 1946

On his return in late 1962, Pryke was summoned to a meeting with Cardinal Gilroy and two of his bishops who, during his absence, had been investigating the content of the theological lectures for the religious sisters.

The result of the “discussion” was that he was sacked from his series of lectures to the young nuns, and his chaplaincy to Sydney University. He was further forbidden to talk to students in an informal capacity. At the diplomatic intervention of Yvonne Swift, principal of Sancta Sophia College within Pryke's Camperdown Parish, Cardinal Gilroy conceded that it was unavoidable that he would encounter students. Another concession was allowed to Swift. She argued that lectures should be allowed to heads of religious orders and nuns in authoritative positions.

These harsh authoritative rulings were a severe setback for Pryke, who for a time experienced a level of depression and despondency. After some time he recovered enough to commit himself to developing the psychological / theological courses for the more senior people in the religious orders, which in the end, became a greater success than those developed for younger people.(1963–1965).

These refreshed courses paralleled the discussions of the Second Vatican Council (1962–65). Pryke and his chosen colleagues were of a minority who were cognisant of all the issues of reform. In retrospect, these “Formation Courses for Sisters”, enthusiastically received, resulted in Pryke's reputation as a leading thinker and his subsequent reputation and legacy.

=== Marriage, Sex and Birth Control ===
During this same period of constructive turmoil in the Church and indeed the world, Pryke's ideas drew many Catholics from far and wide to his Camperdown parish. He practised and advocated the Carl Rogers' method of counselling in assisting his parishioners, guiding individuals in how to solve their own problems, rather than simplistically delivering non nuanced advice in the traditional way. His Sunday sermons and liturgical innovations resulted in much excitement and enthusiasm. St.Joseph's, Camperdown also became the hub for his discussion group on the nature of Christian marriage, the place of sex in a loving relationship, and the emerging contentious question of birth control.

Once again the Christian challenges he could not resist had built up to the point where exhaustion was once again starting to set in. His close friend, the sculptor Tom Bass, organised him into taking regular breaks to a cottage at South Era Beach, south of Sydney.

== Parish priest of Camperdown and later, Harbord ==
Pryke's reputation also led to a plethora of demands for him to give lectures and talks throughout the wider Catholic community. Although very demanding personally, Pryke was incentivised by the animated foment which had become the milieu of responsive Catholics of the sixties.Surprisingly, he was invited to address the students for the priesthood at St Patricks College, Manly (late 1963).

Even though he had been attending the Vatican Council, Cardinal Gilroy's reactionary mentality did not seem to have changed. He had received word that Roger Pryke's lectures, capturing the excitement and content of the Vatican Council, were once again proving extremely successful. He judged that Pryke needed to be curtailed. At the end of 1965, the Cardinal ordered Pryke to leave Camperdown where he was enjoying great success with his students, his parishioners and a televised Mass, and accept a transfer to the somewhat out-of-the-way parish of Harbord on Sydney's North Shore.

Many Camperdown parishioners, however, travelled to Harbord to continue with his liturgy and his sermons. Many of the religious wrote letters to him, expressing disappointment and seeking guidance and advice. As always, he maintained the task of an reader of the leading theologians and Church writers. He answered every letter he received from his spiritual constituency.

== Vietnam War, liturgical change and Humanae Vitae ==
=== Opposition to the war in Vietnam ===
The Vietnam War had become a vexed issue three years before Pryke was appointed to Harbord. The cardinal and the Catholic bishops had supported the war because they understood it to be a battle against the abhorred atheistic communists. Pryke once again clashed with church authorities. He considered that support for the war was based on fear, and was not balanced by the value that Christianity was a religion of peace. In his sermons he took as his theme the words of Martin Luther King Jnr, "We have only two options open - to live together like brothers or to die together like fools."

In a revealing lecture at Sydney University he argued that Christians should oppose the war on the grounds that Jesus was non-violent, that the early Church was non-violent, that the medieval theory of the “just war”, unmentioned in Pope John XXIII's encyclical “Pacem in Terris”, did not apply, and that the roots of violence and war are a not-yet-justified fear.

The passionate controversy over the Vietnam war was to last several years. Roger Pryke produced a magazine, Nonviolent Power, mainly to publish reports and insights into the Vietnam War, the nature of violence in society, and Christian pacifism. The magazine lasted three years (1969–1971) but in the end it failed due to the wide range of skills necessary in producing a quality magazine.

=== Reforms in his parish liturgy ===
On the parish front, he redesigned the church at Harbord so that the priest faced the people. The congregation was seated in a socially intimate semi-circle around the altar table. The Living Parish Hymnal gave life to the liturgy.

With Tony Newman, another initiative in lifting the standard of religious art in churches was partially successful at Harbord, but failed miserably on a national scale and almost led to financial disaster.Another hymn book, Travelling to Freedom, lacked presentation skills and failed the same way.

His pastoral style and moral beliefs attracted many young teenagers. After a while there were over a hundred members in his Catholic Youth Organisation (CYO).

The constant difficulties with Cardinal Gilroy and the Catholic hierarchy, in addition to the stress of supporting the reforms in which Pryke believed, were by now beginning to take their toll. He was also weakened by the constant criticism from Catholics who opposed any change. For the first time since commencing study for the priesthood, Roger Pryke found the burden of celibacy and the emptiness of not having an intimate supporting partner too much to bear. Meg Gilchrist, a married woman and mother of six, whom he had known since his earliest days at Sydney University came back into his life on an occasional but intimate basis.

=== Humanae Vitae encyclical ===
A seismic event for the universal Catholic Church occurred on 25 July 1968 when Pope Paul VI promulgated the authoritative encyclical Humanae Vitae("Human Life"). Contrary to the stated recommendation of the Pontifical Commission on Birth Control (1966), the decision from the Pope was that birth control was forbidden. The prohibition included the use of the contraceptive pill. Catholics throughout the world were shocked and distressed. Pryke, who quietly opposed the encyclical, initially did not speak publicly against it. He realised that it could become, as it did, a major disillusionment within the Catholic Church. He saw the move as so destructive that it became for him a “game-changer”. He withdrew from public discussion to carefully consider all the attendant issues.

=== National Association of Priests ===
In October 1969, Pryke joined the discussion with a number of his confreres about establishing a national association of priests.The move was controversial. Nevertheless, there was enough support to plan a National Convention of Priests to be held at St. Joseph's College, Hunters Hill in May 1970. Another meeting on 2 September 1971 led to the formation of the National Council of Priests. Roger Pryke had accepted the task of examining “the inner life of the priest” based on the method of the Institute for Personality and Ability Testing in the USA. 150 priests participated in a detailed questionnaire on the spiritual challenges they were facing.

The task led Pryke to focus on his own inner state. His belief in the power of the Church to do good, inspire social improvement and improve lives, nurtured in the time of Pope John XXIII and the Vatican Council, had been weakened. The ceaseless opposition and humiliation by Cardinal Gilroy and his coadjutor bishops, the worldwide psychological betrayal of the encyclical Humanae Vitae and Pryke's personal struggle with celibacy seemed to herald the beginning of the end.

=== Visit of Dorothy Day ===
A productive diversion occurred when Dorothy Day, the American social activist and writer, accepted Pryke's invitation to visit Australia. It was a time when he and many of his colleagues joined the campaign to expose the delusion of those who supported the war in Vietnam, and to demand its cessation.

In August 1970, Pryke organised Day to begin her tour in Melbourne, managed by his colleagues, Val Noone and John Heffey, and reside with the writer Paul Ormonde and his family. Day, a pacifist, mixed informally with anti-Vietnam campaigners and presented two packed out public lectures, one at Melbourne University and the other at Corpus Christi College, Glen Waverley.

In NSW she addressed a full house at Sydney Town Hall with Dr Jim Cairns and Roger Pryke, “giving a major boost to peace groups across the country”.

At the Harbord Parish where she and her colleague, Eileen Egan stayed, she was kept busy by Pryke. She gave eight seminars and two public talks, as well as interviews to journalists, reporters and radio programs. Her main themes were on Christian pacifism, the war in Vietnam, The Catholic Worker movement, the need for community, the corporal works of mercy and feeding and sheltering the poor as well as direct action to support justice and the place of civil disobedience.

After the Dorothy Day visit, Pryke re-committed himself to evolving the Harbord parish in accordance with the Vatican Council. He played a leadership role in opposing the 1971 Springbok Rugby Union tour of Australia and New Zealand as part of the “crusade” against apartheid.

== Post-Church career ==
In a letter to his parishioners, Pryke resigned from the ministry on 16 April 1972. and married Margaret (Meg) Gilchrist on 25 August 1972. Because of his high status for the 28 years he served in the priesthood, the change in his lifestyle was dramatic and marked for himself, his family and his friends.

He found employment in the prison service - the Department of Corrective Services - as a parole officer. Without the public fanfare generated by the circumstances of a large organisation like the Catholic Church, those who worked with him contend that Pryke made a substantial contribution to the improvement of the prison service in NSW. In time he was promoted to senior positions. Tony Vinson, Chairman of the NSW Corrective Services Commission, credits Roger Pryke with a major reform of the system in regard to the protection of minors within the prisons, thus diminishing the sexual assaults on minors by hardened criminals. Vinson describes Pryke as a man with “charm, good humour and fundamental decency”. Fellow public servant and ministerial committee member Ken Buttrum recalls Pryke's contribution as follows:

(I have) fond memories of Roger’s many great leadership skills, and it’s just a shame that his contribution to the development of new services for disadvantaged youth supported by the Department of Community Services in the mid 70s are not outlined in the (Harvey) book. He led a ministerial committee, of which I was a member, recommending major changes to young offender services throughout this state. It was my privilege to then implement these services. What an extraordinary individual of great vision and compassion! I will never forget his humility, great personal strength and personal encouragement as one of my supervisors. The private sector greatly benefitted from his vision, skill and invaluable leadership.

Later he contributed as a welfare officer and as an Official Visitor to Parramatta Gaol.

=== Death of his wife Margaret: retirement: last days ===
On 9 November 1994 after a traumatic fall from a horse, Margaret (Meg) Pryke tragically died of a brain aneurysm. The following year Roger Pryke retired.In his retirement he slowly developed Alzheimer's and at the end his condition was so complete he could remember very little. He saw out his days at the Glengarry Nursing Hostel near Mosman - a suburb of Sydney. He died on 28 June 2009.

== Two extraordinary funerals ==
Even though he had spent years in a non compos mentis state, Roger Pryke had not been forgotten. He had two funerals, one religious and one secular.

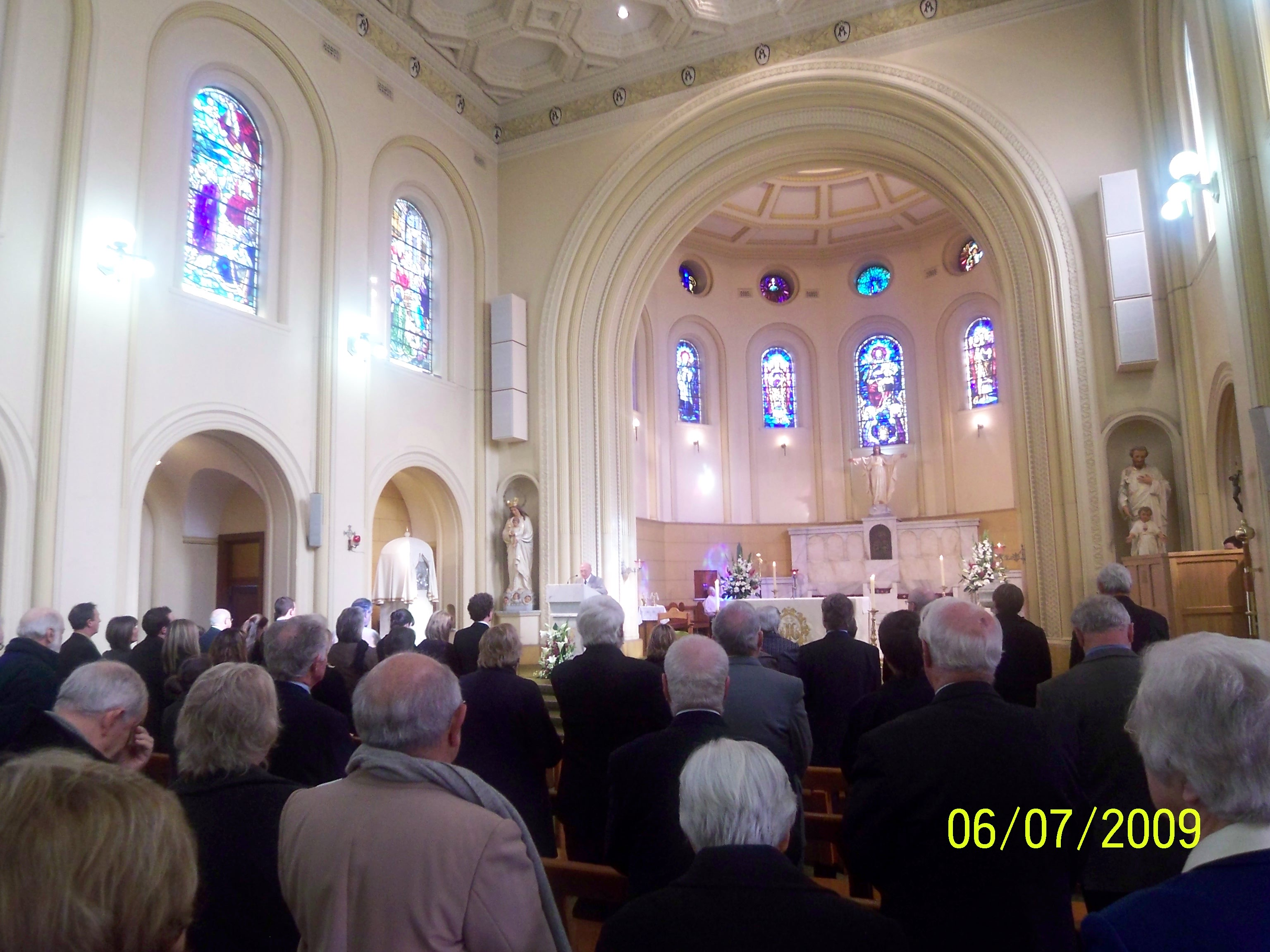
Roger Pryke had two funerals. This is the church one.

Even though he had left the priesthood and the practice of religion, a large body of Catholics recognised his extensive influence in improving the Church in Australia and his positive influence on thousands of lives. His many friends in the Catholic clergy and laity considered they were entitled to celebrate the legacy of positive influence which he had left behind when he departed the ministry. The concelebrated Mass at the large chapel at St Joseph's College, Hunters Hill was packed. There were panegyrics from several priestly colleagues including Dr. Grove Johnson and Fr. Edmund Campion. It was as if Roger Pryke had never left the Church.

The civil service which followed at the Crematorium, was totally secular in nature and was presided over by Peter Phelan, a former priest, colleague and close friend. There were five appointed speakers who presented eulogies. All speakers gave testimony to the positive influence Roger Pryke had on their personal lives, which in many cases reassured them while they were within Catholicism and after they had left it. Many appreciated the principles of personal living which, because of Roger Pryke, still enriched their lives well after they had rejected the supernatural infrastructure of religion. John Murray reminded those attending that towards the end of his life Pryke had rejected religion altogether and had become a non-believer. After the planned service a queue of people formed to add to the tributes. Most were from the prison service - many did not get the chance because the time period allotted by the crematorium had run out.

== External Sources ==
Campion, Edmund Swifty: A life of Yvonne Swift, Sydney: New South Publishing, ISBN 9781742234755
