= Alan Andrew Watson =

British physicist

Alan Watson
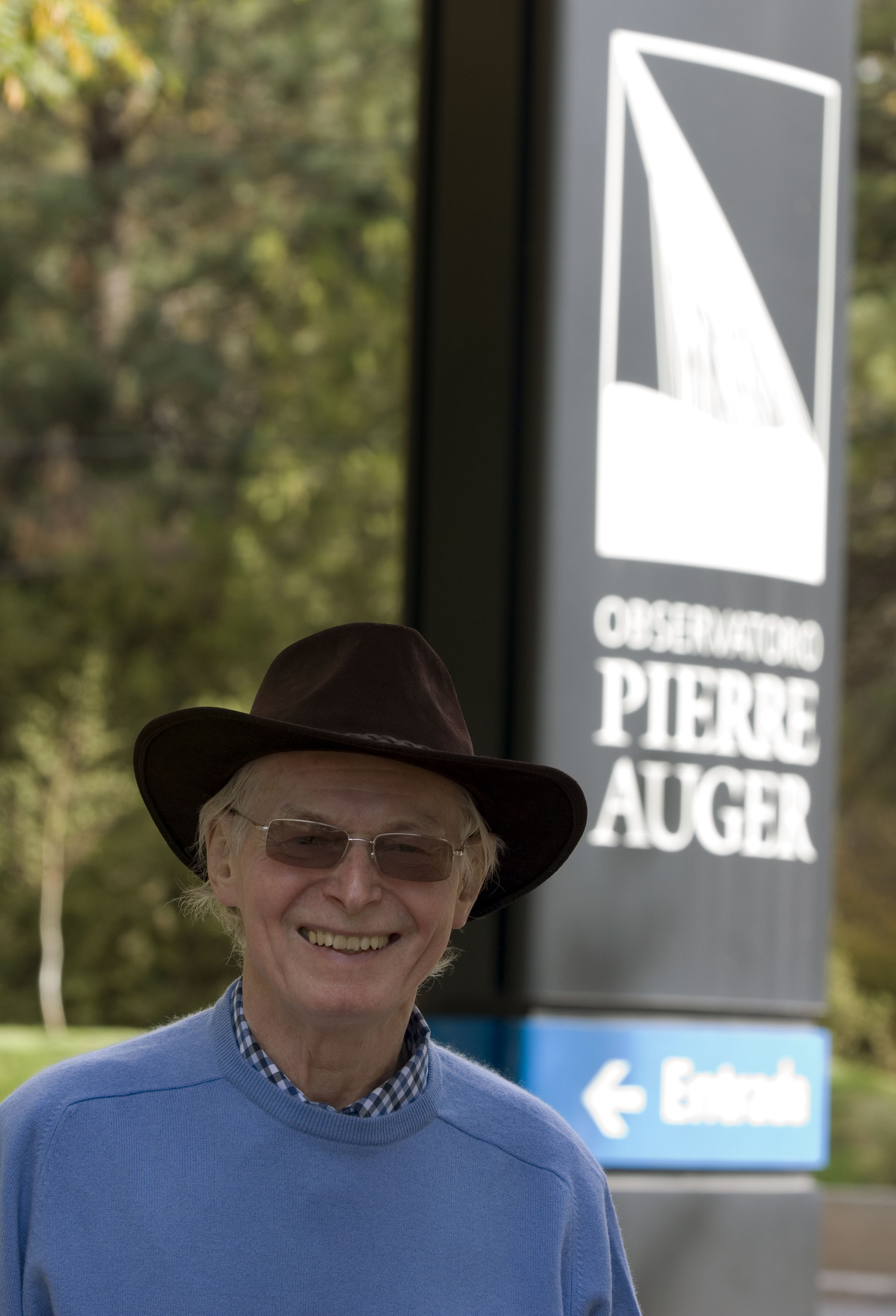
- Watson at the Pierre Auger Observatory, Malargue, Argentina in 2008
- Born: Alan Andrew Watson; 26 September 1938 (age 87); Edinburgh, Scotland
- Education: University of Edinburgh
- Known for: Haverah Park, Pierre Auger Observatory
- Scientific career
- Fields: Ultra-high energy cosmic rays, ultra-high energy gamma-rays and high energy astrophysics
- Workplaces: University of Leeds
- Thesis: Physics of condensation of water vapour (1964)
- Doctoral students: Clement Pryke
- Website: www.ast.leeds.ac.uk/Auger/augerpeople/Watson/

Alan Andrew Watson, FRS, (born 26 September 1938 in Edinburgh) is a physicist and an emeritus professor at the University of Leeds, England.

== Education ==
Watson was educated at the University of Edinburgh (BSc 1960 first class honours in physics) and was awarded the degree of PhD in 1964 for his thesis on the physics of condensation of water vapour: Examination and possible exploitation of certain unexplored features in the operation of high pressure cloud chambers. After completing his PhD, he took up a lectureship at the University of Leeds in 1964. His main areas of interest are high-energy cosmic rays, ultra high-energy gamma rays and high-energy astrophysics.

== Career ==
Watson was professor of physics at the University of Leeds from 1984, having previously been reader in particle cosmic physics there, and retired in 2003 with the title emeritus professor.

He was a leading member of the UK Extensive Air Shower project at Haverah Park from 1964 until its closure in the early 1990s, directing the project from 1976. The work there led to the best estimates of the energy spectrum, mass composition and arrival direction distribution of cosmic rays available at that time, and was regarded as the premier project in the field for about 15 years.

He was the UK Principal Investigator for a project (SPASE) carried out at the South Pole, jointly with collaborators from the University of Delaware, USA, which ran from 1987 to 1994. Initially, the aim of this work was to look for gamma-rays from the supernova, SN1987A, but it broadened in scope through collaboration with the pioneering AMANDA phase of the IceCube neutrino project, targeting the mass composition of cosmic rays above 10^{14} eV.

While on sabbatical at the Whipple Observatory in 1994, Watson played a key role in the detection of flaring of the previously-discovered extragalactic source Markarian 421 in TeV gamma rays.

Watson was instrumental, along with J W Cronin, in the creation of the Pierre Auger Observatory in Argentina (begun 1999) which has gathered the data that led to major discoveries in cosmic-ray astronomy, notably providing evidence that the highest energy particles are nuclei of intermediate mass and that there are significant anisotropies in the distribution of arrival directions. The observatory covers an area of 3000 square km with 1,600 particle detectors each placed at 1.5 kilometres (0.93 mi) intervals. Watson served as co-Spokesperson for the Collaboration from 1995 – 2001 and as Spokesperson from 2001 – 2007, later being given the title of Spokesperson Emeritus.

He remains active in the analysis of data from the Observatory.

== Awards and honours ==
Watson was elected a Fellow of the Royal Society (FRS) in 2000.

He received the degree of Doctor Honoris Causa from Universidade de Santiago de Compostela in 2009.

In 2011 he was awarded the Institute of Physics Michael Faraday Medal and Prize and the Cormac Ó Ceallaigh Medal from the IUPAP Cosmic Ray Commission.

2008 George Darwin Lecture, Royal Astronomical Society, London.

2008 Manne Siegbahn Lecture, Alba Nova, University of Stockholm.

2012 Jentschke Lecture, DESY, Hamburg.

2019 Victor Hess Memorial Lecture, International Cosmic Ray Conference, Madison.

2019 John Simpson Memorial Lecture, University of Chicago.
