= Pierre Auger Observatory =

International cosmic ray observatory in Argentina

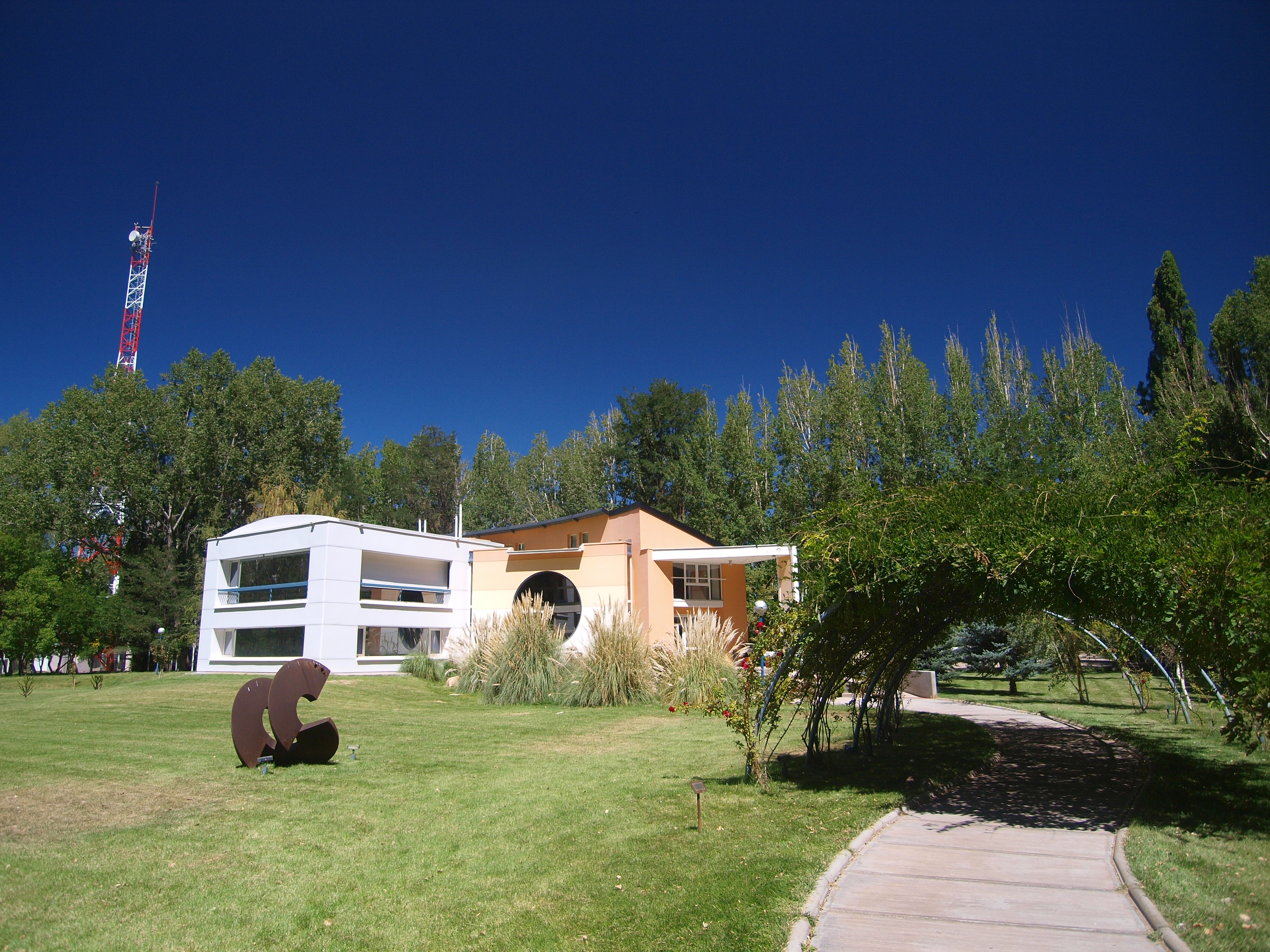
- Control building in Malargüe
- Location: Malargüe; Province of Mendoza, Argentina
- Coordinates: 35°12′24″S 69°18′57″W
- Organization: Multi-national
- Altitude: 1330 m–1620 m, average ~1400 m
- Wavelength: 330–380 nm UV (Fluorescence detector), 10^{17}–10^{21} eV cosmic rays (Surface detector)
- Built: 2004–2008 (and taking data during construction)
- Telescope style: Hybrid (Surface + Fluorescence detectors)
- Website: Official site
- Location within Argentina
- Related media on Commons

The Pierre Auger Observatory is an international cosmic ray observatory in Argentina designed to detect ultra-high-energy cosmic rays: sub-atomic particles traveling nearly at the speed of light and each with energies beyond 10^{18} eV. In Earth's atmosphere such particles interact with air nuclei and produce various other particles. These effect particles (called an "air shower") can be detected and measured. But since these high energy particles have an estimated arrival rate of just 1 per km^{2} per century, the Auger Observatory has created a detection area of 3,000 km^{2} (1,200 sq mi)—the size of Rhode Island, or Luxembourg—in order to record a large number of these events. It is located in the western Mendoza Province, Argentina, near the Andes.

Construction began in 2000, the observatory has been taking production-grade data since 2005 and was officially completed in 2008. The northern site was to be located in southeastern Colorado, United States and hosted by Lamar Community College. It also was to consist of water-Cherenkov detectors and fluorescence telescopes, covering the area of 10,370 km^{2}—3.3 times larger than Auger South.

The observatory was named after the French physicist Pierre Victor Auger. The project was proposed by Jim Cronin and Alan Watson in 1992. Today, more than 500 physicists from nearly 100 institutions around the world are collaborating to maintain and upgrade the site in Argentina and collect and analyse the measured data. The 15 participating countries shared the $50 million construction budget, each providing a small portion of the total cost.

== Physical background ==
From outer space, ultra-high-energy cosmic rays reach Earth. These consist of single sub-atomic particles (protons or atomic nuclei), each with energy levels beyond 10^{18} eV. When such a single particle reaches Earth atmosphere, it has its energy dissipated by creating billions of other particles: electrons, photons and muons, all near the speed of light. These particles spread longitudinally (perpendicular to the single particle incoming route), creating a forward moving plane of particles, with higher intensities near the axis. Such an incident is called an "air shower". Passing through the atmosphere, this plane of particles creates UV light, invisible to the human eye, called the fluorescing effect, more or less in the pattern of straight lightning traces. These traces can be photographed at high speed by specialised telescopes, called Fluorescence Detectors, overlooking an area at a slight elevation. Then, when the particles reach the Earth's surface, they can be detected when they arrive in a water tank, where they cause visible blue light due to the Cherenkov effect. A sensitive photoelectric tube can catch these impacts. Such a station is called a water-Cherenkov Detector or 'tank'. The Auger Observatory has both types of detectors covering the same area, which allows for very precise measurements.

When an air shower hits multiple Cherenkov Detectors on the ground, the direction of the ray can be calculated using basic geometrics. The longitudinal axis point can be determined from the densities in each affected ground station. Depending on the time difference of impact places, the angle of the axis can be determined. Only when the axis would be vertical, all ground detectors register at the very same moment in time, and any tilting of the axis will cause a time difference between earliest and latest touchdown.

=== Earlier observatories ===
Cosmic rays were discovered in 1912 by Victor Hess. He measured a difference in ionisation at different heights (using the Eiffel tower and a Hess-manned hot air balloon), an indication of the atmospheric thinning (so spreading) of a single ray. Influence of the Sun was ruled out by measuring during an eclipse. Many scientists researched the phenomenon, sometimes independently, and in 1937 Pierre Auger could conclude in detail that it was a single ray that interacted with air nuclei, causing an electron and photon air shower. At the same time, the third particle muon was discovered (behaving like a very heavy electron).

== Overview ==
=== Surface detector (SD) ===
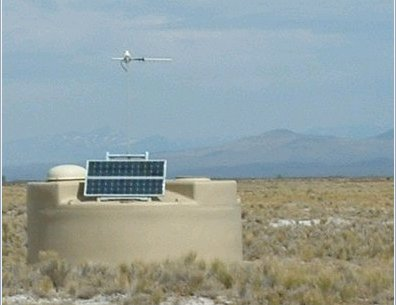
Surface detector (SD) station, or 'tank', of the Pierre Auger Observatory.

In 1967 University of Leeds had developed a water-Cherenkov detector (or surface station; a small water basin, 1.2 m deep; also called tank) and created a 12 km^{2} detection area Haverah Park using 200 such tanks. They were arranged in groups of four in a triangular (Y) ground pattern, the triangles in different sizes. The observatory worked for 20 years, and produced the main design parameters for the ground detection system at Auger Observatory. It was Alan Watson who in the later years led the research team and subsequently co-initiated Auger Observatory Collaboration.

=== Fluorescence detector (FD) ===
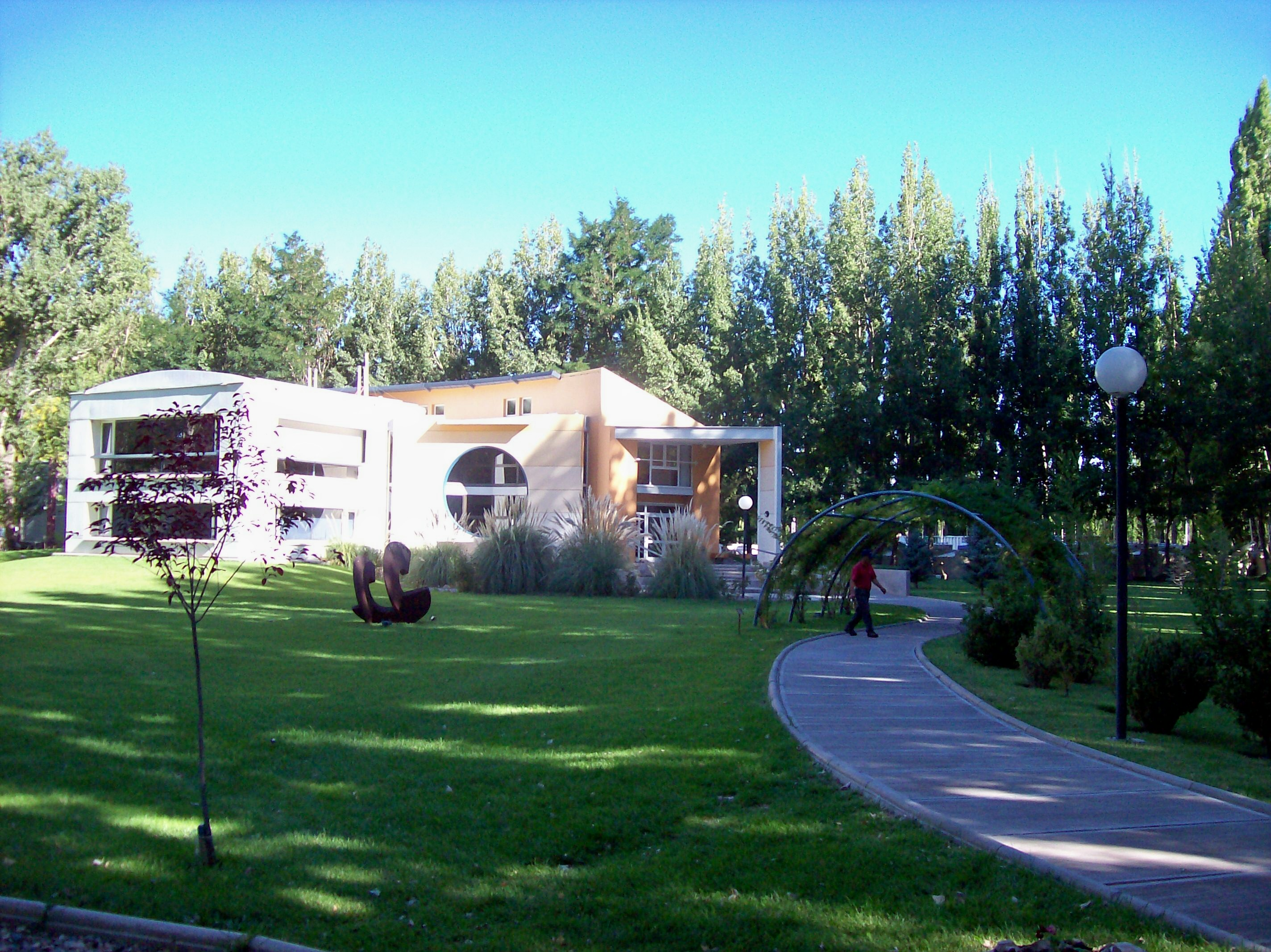
The Central Campus building in Malargüe.

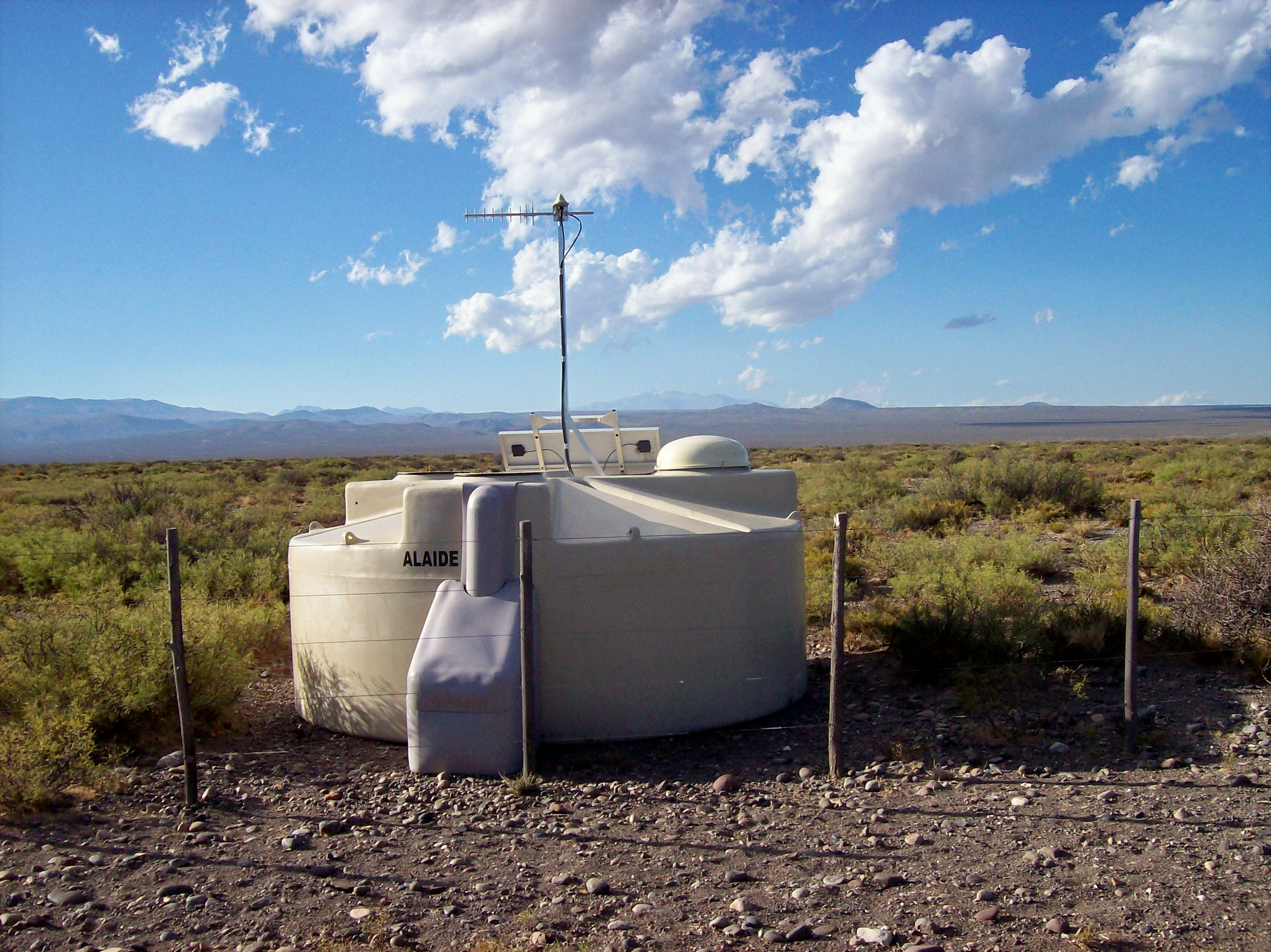
Back view of a surface detector station.

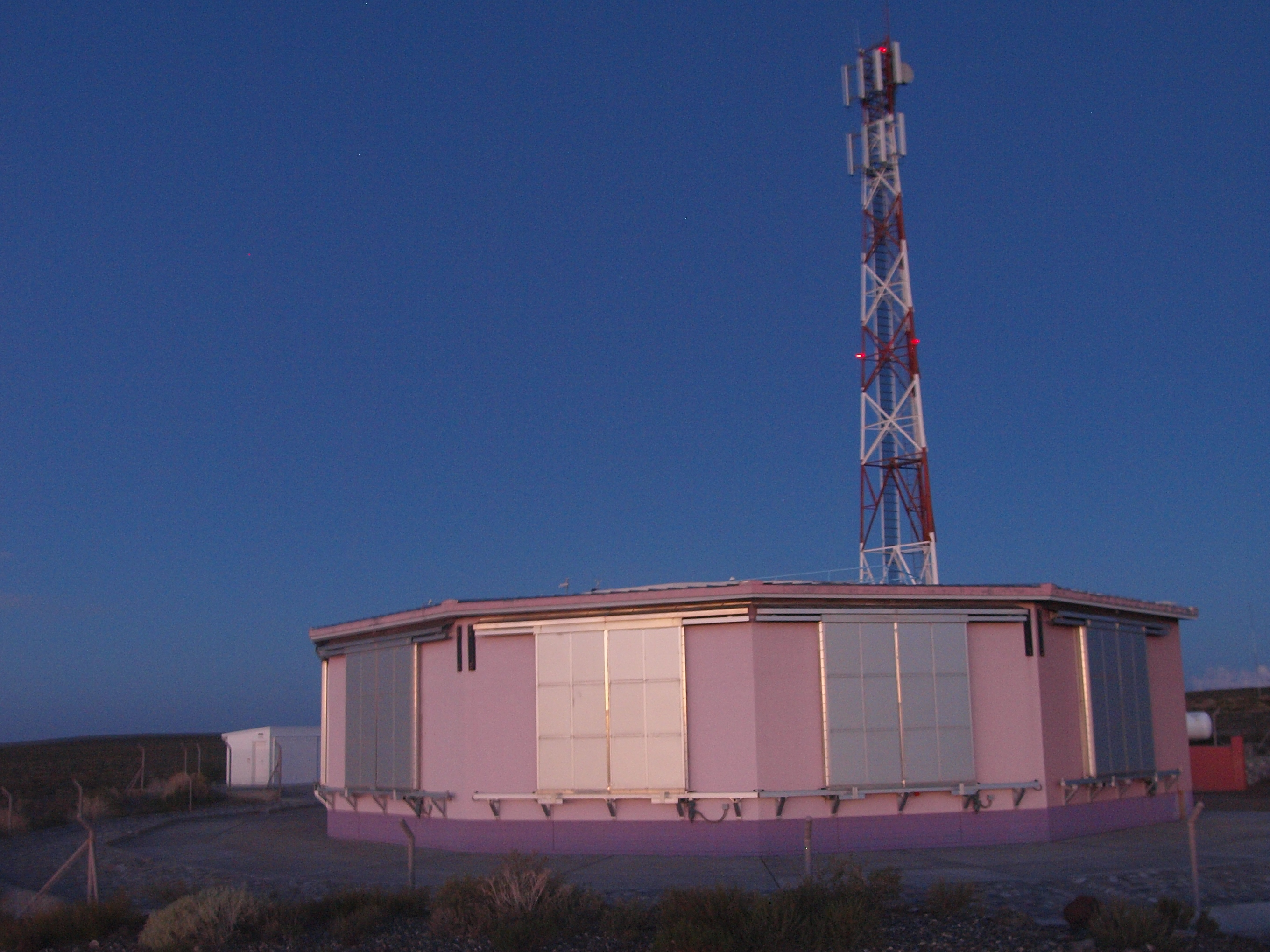
One of four Fluorescence detector (FD) buildings.

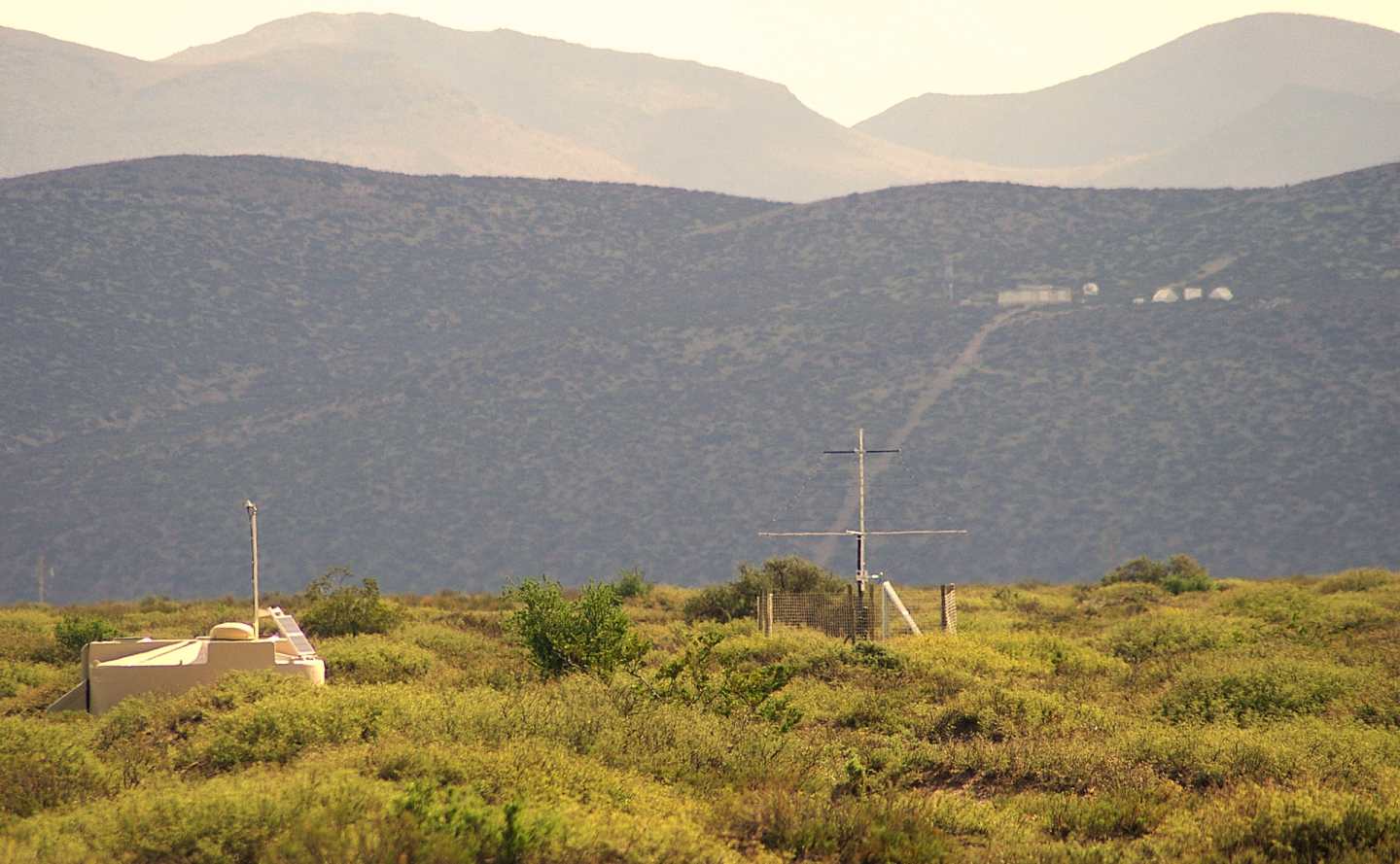
SD station and AERA antenna in the foreground, one FD building and the three HEAT telescopes in the background.

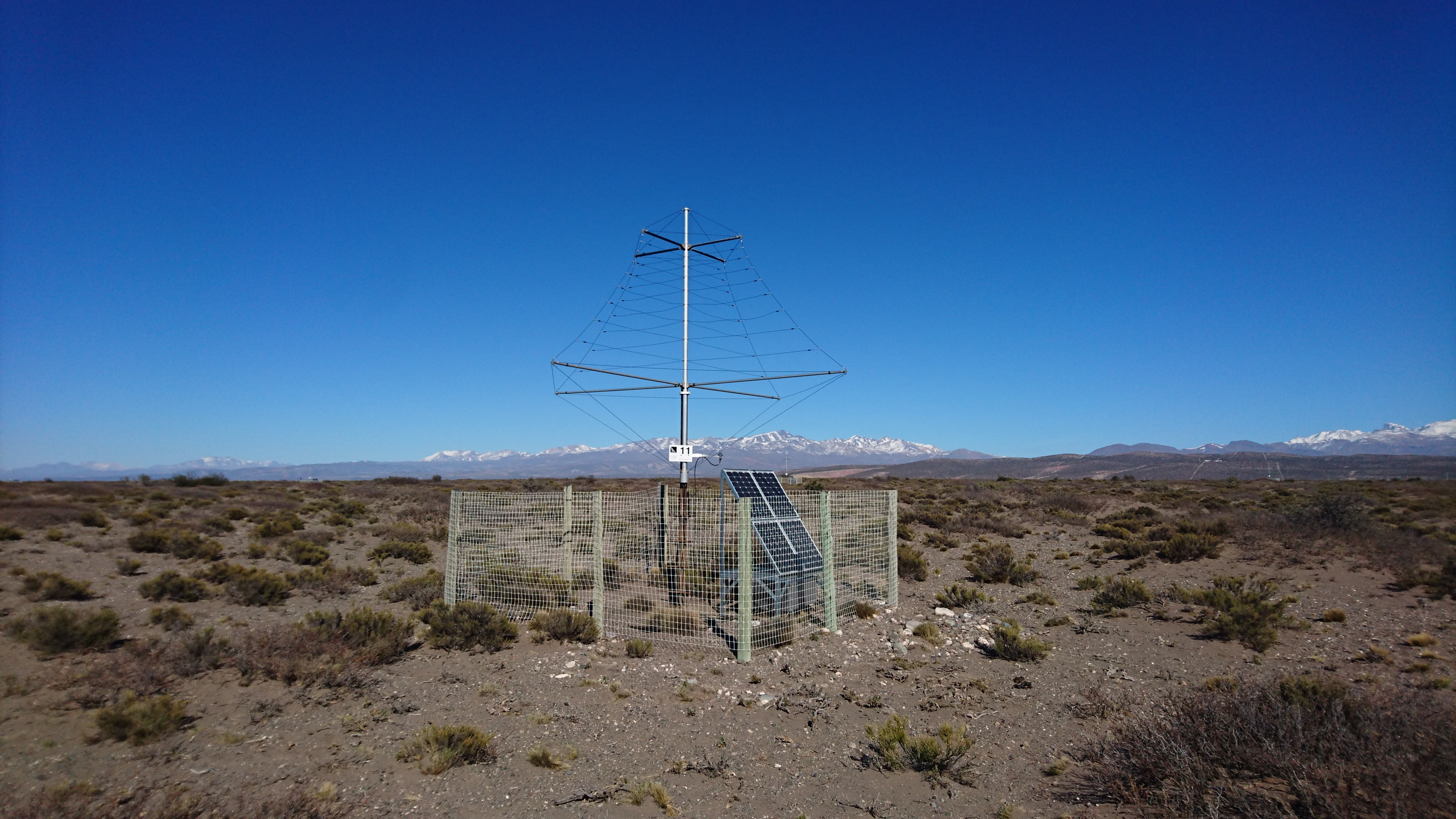
AERA antenna with the Andes in the background

Meanwhile, from the Volcano Ranch (New Mexico, 1959–1978), the Fly's Eye (Dugway, Utah) and its successor the High Resolution Fly's Eye Cosmic Ray Detector called "HiRes" or "Fly's Eye" (University of Utah), the technique of the fluorescence detector was developed. These are optical telescopes, adjusted to picture UV light rays when looking over a surface area. It uses faceted observation (hence the fly's eye reference), to produce pixeled pictures at high speed. In 1992, James Cronin led the research and co-initiated the Auger Observation Collaboration.

=== Designing and building ===
The Pierre Auger Observatory is unique in that it is the first experiment that combines both ground detectors and fluorescence detectors at the same site thus allowing cross-calibration and reduction of systematic effects that may be peculiar to each technique. The Cherenkov detectors use three large photomultiplier tubes to detect the Cherenkov radiation produced by high-energy particles passing through water in the tank. The time of arrival of high-energy particles from the same shower at several tanks is used to calculate the direction of travel of the original particle. The fluorescence detectors are used to track the particle air shower's glow on cloudless moonless nights, as it descends through the atmosphere.

In 1995 at Fermilab, Chicago, the basic design was made for the Auger observatory. For half a year, many scientists produced the main requirements, and a cost estimation, for the projected Auger. The observatory's area had to be reduced from 5000 km^{2} to 3000 km^{2}.

When construction began, a full-scale prototype was set up first: the Engineering Array. This array consisted of the first 40 ground detectors and a single fluorescence detector. All were fully equipped. The engineering array operated for 6 months in 2001 as a prototype; it was later integrated into the main setup. It was used to make more detailed design choices (like which type of photomultiplier tube (PMT) to use, and tank water quality requirements) and to calibrate.

In 2003, it became the largest ultra-high energy cosmic ray detector in the world. It is located on the vast plain of Pampa Amarilla, near the town of Malargüe in Mendoza Province, Argentina. The basic set-up consists of 1600 water Cherenkov Detectors or 'tanks', (similar to the Haverah Park experiment) distributed over 3,000 square kilometres (1,200 sq mi), along with 24 atmospheric Fluorescence Detector telescopes (FD; similar to the High Resolution Fly's Eye) overseeing the surface array.

To support the atmospheric measurements (FD measurements), supporting stations are added to the site:

- Central Laser Facility station (CLF)
- eXtreme Laser Facility (XLF)
- The four fluorescence detector stations also operate: Lidar, infrared cloud detection (IR camera), a weather station, aerosol phase function monitors (APF; 2 out of four), optical telescopes HAM (one) and FRAM (one)
- Balloon launch station (BLS): until December 2010, within hours after a notable shower a meteorologic balloon was launched to record atmospheric data up to 23 km height.

=== Locations ===
Station	Type	Location
Ground station array	1600 surface detection stations (SD) (centerpoint of area)	35.20675°S 69.31597°W
Los Leones	6 fluorescence detectors	35.49584°S 69.44979°W
Morados	6 fluorescence detectors	35.28108°S 69.00349°W
Loma Amarilla	6 fluorescence detectors	34.93597°S 69.21084°W
Coihueco	6 fluorescence detectors	35.11409°S 69.59975°W
Observatory campus	central office	35.48084°S 69.57052°W
Malargüe	city	35.46844°S 69.58478°W

== Results ==
The observatory has been taking good-quality data since 2005 and was officially completed in 2008.

In November 2007, the Auger Project team announced some preliminary results. These showed that the directions of origin of the 27 highest-energy events were correlated with the locations of active galactic nuclei (AGNs). A subsequent test with a much larger data sample revealed however that the large degree of initially observed correlation was most probably due to a statistical fluctuation.

In 2017, data from 12 years of observations enabled the discovery of a significant anisotropy of the arrival direction of cosmic rays at energies above 8×10^{18} eV. This supports that extragalactic sources (i.e. outside of our galaxy) for the origin of these extremely high energy cosmic rays (see Ultra-high-energy cosmic ray). However, it is not yet known what type of galaxies are responsible for the acceleration of these ultra-high-energy cosmic rays. This question remains under investigation with the AugerPrime upgrade of the Pierre Auger Observatory.

The Pierre Auger Collaboration has made available (for outreach purposes) 1 percent of the ground array events below 50 EeV (10^{18} eV). Higher energy events require more physical analysis and are not published this way. The data can be explored at the Public Event Display web site.

As of October 2021, a portion of the data (10 percent) presented at the 2019 International Cosmic Ray Conference in Madison, USA, is publicly available.

== Developments ==
Research and development was done on new detection techniques and ( to) on possible upgrades to the observatory, including:

- three additional fluorescence detecting telescopes, capable of covering higher altitudes (HEAT—High Elevation Auger Telescopes)
- two higher-density nested arrays of surface detectors combined with underground muon counters (AMIGA—Auger Muons and Infill for the Ground Array)
- a prototype radiotelescope array (AERA—Auger Engineering Radio Array) for detecting radioemission from the shower cascade, in the frequency range 30–80 MHz
- R&D on detecting microwave emission from shower electrons (frequencies around 4 GHz)

=== AugerPrime Upgrade ===
AugerPrime is a major upgrade of the Pierre Auger Observatory under construction since 2019:

- the surface detectors will be enhanced by scintillation detectors and radio antennas
- the duty cycle of the FD measurements will be extended for the highest energies to include nights with moon light
- AMIGA will be completed: in a 20 km^{2} densely spaced area of the surface detector, each surface detector will be equipped with underground muon detectors

All these enhancements aim at increasing the measurement accuracy of the Pierre Auger Observatory, in particular for the mass of the primary cosmic-ray particles.

== In popular culture ==
Argentina issued 100,000 postage stamps honouring the observatory on 14 July 2007. The stamp shows a surface detector tank in the foreground, a building of fluorescence detectors in the background, and the expression "10^{20} eV" in large lettering.

== See also ==
- List of astronomical observatories
- List of astronomical societies
- Lists of telescopes
