= James Cronin =

American particle physicist

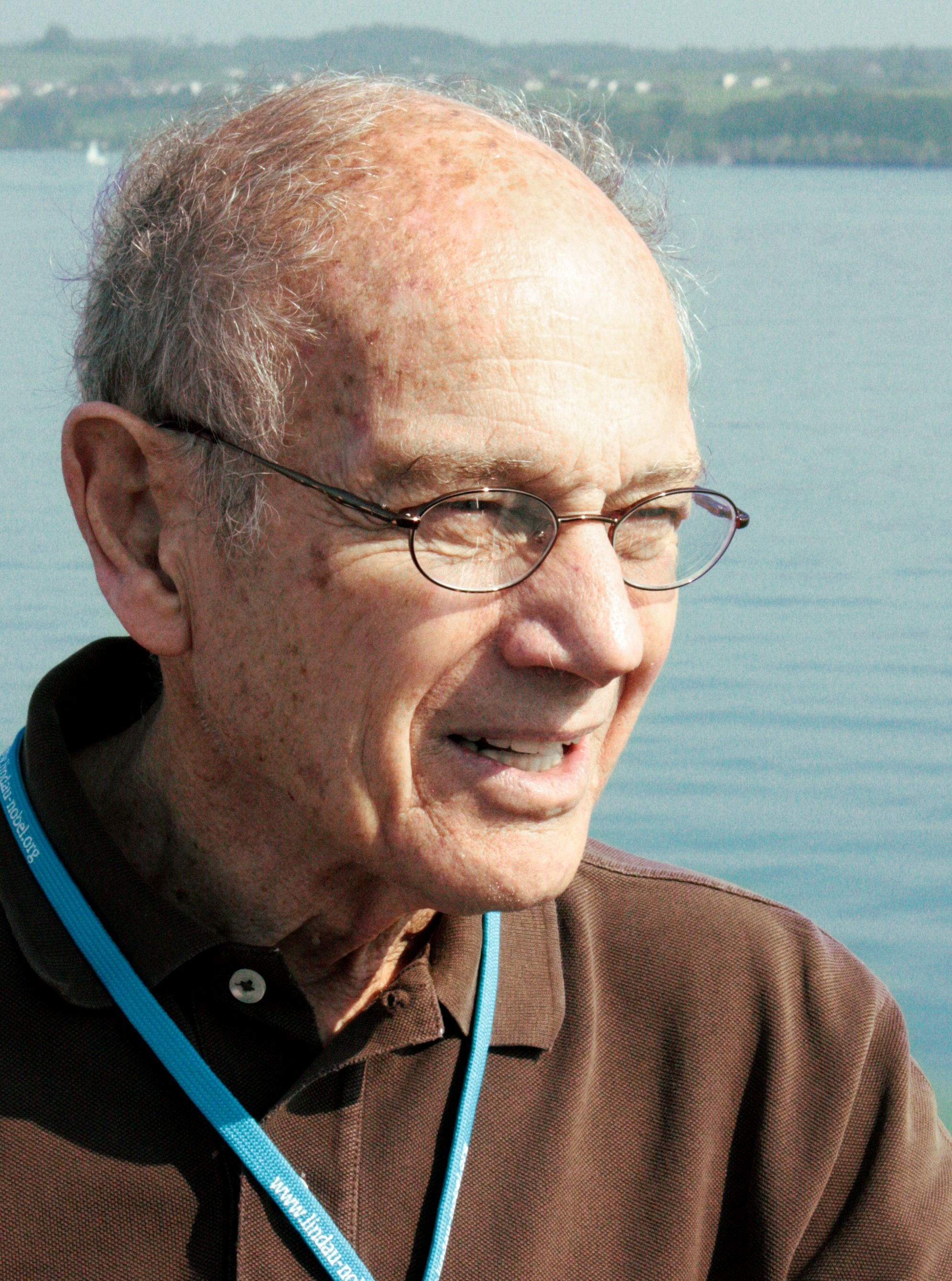
- Cronin at the 2010 Lindau Nobel Laureate Meeting
- Born: James Watson Cronin; September 29, 1931; Chicago, Illinois, U.S.
- Died: August 25, 2016 (aged 84); Saint Paul, Minnesota, U.S.
- Education: Southern Methodist University; University of Chicago
- Known for: Nuclear physics
- Spouse: Annette Martin (m. 1954)
- Children: 3
- Awards: E. O. Lawrence Award (1976); Nobel Prize in Physics (1980); John Price Wetherill Medal; National Medal of Science
- Scientific career
- Fields: Physics
- Workplaces: University of Chicago University of Utah

James Watson Cronin (September 29, 1931 – August 25, 2016) was an American particle physicist.

Cronin and co-researcher Val Logsdon Fitch were awarded the 1980 Nobel Prize in Physics for a 1964 experiment that proved that certain subatomic reactions do not adhere to fundamental symmetry principles. Specifically, they proved, by examining the decay of kaons, that a reaction run in reverse does not merely retrace the path of the original reaction, which showed that the interactions of subatomic particles are not invariant under time reversal. Thus the phenomenon of CP violation was discovered.

Cronin received the Ernest Orlando Lawrence Award in 1976 for major experimental contributions to particle physics including fundamental work on weak interactions culminating in the discovery of asymmetry under time reversal. In 1999, he was awarded the National Medal of Science.

Cronin was Professor Emeritus at the University of Chicago winning the prestigious Quantrell Award and a spokesperson emeritus for the Auger project. He was a member of the Board of Sponsors of the Bulletin of the Atomic Scientists.

== Early life and education ==
James Cronin was born in Chicago on September 29, 1931. His father, James Farley Cronin, was a graduate student of classical languages at the University of Chicago. After his father had obtained his doctorate the family first moved to Alabama, and later in 1939 to Dallas, Texas, where his father became a professor of Latin and Greek at Southern Methodist University. After high school Cronin stayed in Dallas and obtained an undergraduate degree at SMU in physics and mathematics in 1951. He is of Irish descent, with his Irish ancestors immigrating from County Cork, Ireland.

For graduate school Cronin moved back to Illinois to attend the University of Chicago. His teachers there included Nobel Prize laureates Enrico Fermi, Maria Mayer, Murray Gell-Mann and Subrahmanyan Chandrasekhar. He wrote his thesis on experimental nuclear physics under supervision of Samuel K. Allison.

== Research and career ==
After obtaining his doctorate in 1955, Cronin joined the group of Rodney L. Cool and Oreste Piccioni at Brookhaven National Laboratory, where the new Cosmotron particle accelerator had just been completed. There he started to study parity violation in the decay of hyperon particles. During that time he also met Val Fitch, who brought him to Princeton University in Fall 1958. After Cosmotron underwent magnet failure, Cronin and the Brookhaven group moved to Bevatron at the University of California, Berkeley during the first half of 1958. Cronin and Fitch studied the decays of neutral K mesons, in which they discovered CP violation in 1964. This discovery earned the duo the 1980 Nobel Prize in Physics.

After the discovery, Cronin spent a year in France at the Centre d'Études Nucléaires at Saclay. After returning to Princeton he continued studying the neutral CP violating decay modes of the long-lived neutral K meson. In 1971, he moved back to the University of Chicago to become a full professor. This was attractive for him because of a new 400 GeV particle accelerator being built at nearby Fermilab. He received the Quantrell Award.

When he moved to Chicago, he began a long series of experiments on particle production at high transverse momentum. With physicist Pierre Piroue and colleagues we learned about many things. These are summarized in Physical Review D, vol 19, page 764 (1977). Following these experiments Cronin took a sabbatical at CERN in 1982–83, where he performed an experiment to measure of the lifetime of the neutral pion (Physics Letters vol 158 B page 81, 1985). He then switched to the study of cosmic rays. The first was a series of measurements looking for point sources of cosmic rays. No sources were found. A summary of the measurements was published in Physical Review D vol 55 page 1714 (1997). In 1998 he joined the faculty at the University of Utah on a half-time basis to work on ultra-high-energy cosmic ray physics and to jumpstart the Pierre Auger Observatory project. His appointment was to last five years, but he left after a year to continue gathering international support for the Observatory with Alan Watson and Murat Boratav.

Cronin is one of the 20 American recipients of the Nobel Prize in Physics to sign a letter addressed to President George W. Bush in May 2008, urging him to "reverse the damage done to basic science research in the Fiscal Year 2008 Omnibus Appropriations Bill" by requesting additional emergency funding for the Department of Energy's Office of Science, the National Science Foundation, and the National Institute of Standards and Technology.

=== Publications ===
- Banner, M.; Cronin, J. W.; Liu, J. K.; & J. E. Pilcher. "Measurement of the Branching Ratio K{sub L} → γ γ / K{sub L} → 3π{sup 0}", Palmer Physical Laboratory, Princeton University, United States Department of Energy (through predecessor agency the Atomic Energy Commission), (August 12, 1968).
- Banner, M.; Cronin, J. W.; Liu, J. K.; & J. E. Pilcher. "Measurement of the Branching Ratio K{sub L} → 2π{sup 0} / K{sub L} → 3π{sup 0}", Palmer Physical Laboratory, Princeton University, United States Department of Energy (through predecessor agency the Atomic Energy Commission), (August 14, 1968).
- Cronin, J. W.; Frisch, H. J.; Shochet, M. J.; Boymond, J. P.; Mermod, R.; Piroue, P. A.; & R. L. Sumner. "Atomic Number Dependence of Hadron Production at Large Transverse Momentum in 300 GeV Proton—Nucleus Collisions", Enrico Fermi Institute, University of Chicago, Joseph Henry Laboratories, Princeton University, United States Department of Energy (through predecessor agency the Atomic Energy Commission), National Science Foundation, (July 15, 1974).
- Brun, T. O.; Carpenter, J. M.; Krohn, V. E.; Ringo, G. R.; Cronin, J. W.; Dombeck, T. W.; Lynn, J. W.; & S. A. Werner. "Measurement of Ultracold Neutrons Produced by Using Doppler-shifted Bragg Reflection at a Pulsed-neutron Source", Argonne National Laboratory, University of Chicago, University of Maryland, College Park, University of Missouri, United States Department of Energy, (1979).
- Cronin, J. W.; Deshpande, N. G.; Kane, G. L.; Luth, V. C.; Odian, A. C.; Machacek, M. E.; Paige, F.; Schmidt, M. P.; Slaughter, J.; & G. H. Trilling. "Report of the Working Group on CP Violation and Rare Decays", University of Chicago, University of Oregon, University of Michigan, Stanford Linear Accelerator Center (SLAC), Northeastern University, Brookhaven National Laboratory (BNL), United States Department of Energy, (October 1984).
- Abraham J., Cronin J. W. et al., Observation of suppression of the Flux of Cosmic Rays above 4x10**19 eV., Phys Rev Letters vol 101, p 061101, (2008).

== Personal life ==
While in graduate school he also met his wife, Annette Martin, whom he married in 1954. She was the Director of Special Events at the University of Chicago. They have three children: two daughters, Cathryn (b. 1955) and Emily (b. 1959), and a son, Daniel (b. 1971). In June 2005 Annette Martin died of complications of Parkinson's disease. She was 71.

In November 2006 he married Carol Champlin.

In May 2011 his daughter Cathryn Cranston died of leukemia at age 54.

Cronin died on August 25, 2016, at the age of 84.
