= Edmund Campion (historian) =

Australian Catholic priest and historian

Edmund Campion (born 1933 in Sydney) is an Australian Catholic priest and historian.

He was educated at Saint Ignatius' College, Riverview and the University of Sydney, where he was editor of the student newspaper Honi Soit in 1953. He was appointed a lecturer in history at the Catholic Institute of Sydney, later becoming Professor of History there.

He spoke against Australian involvement in the Vietnam War and in the 1970s was active in residents' action groups in Woolloomooloo.

His books on Australian Catholic history combine a personal point of view with discussions of the wider social context and the impact of Australian Catholics in many fields.

== Books ==
- 1980, John Henry Newman: Friends, Allies, Bishops, Catholics, Melbourne: Dove Communications, ISBN 0859241254
- 1982, Rockchoppers: Growing Up Catholic in Australia, Ringwood, Vic: Penguin, ISBN 0140064451;
- 1987, Australian Catholics, Ringwood, Vic: Viking, ISBN 0670816957
- 1994, A Place in the City, Ringwood, Vic: Penguin, ISBN 0140179135
- 1996 (edited), Catholic Voices: Best Australian Catholic Writing, Melbourne: David Lovell Publishing, ISBN 1863550534
- 1997, Great Australian Catholics, Ringwood, Vic: David Lovell Publishing, ISBN 1863550577;
- Lines of My Life: Journal of a Year. Camberwell, Vic: Penguin. 2003. ISBN 0143001523.
- 2009, Ted Kennedy: Priest of Redfern, Kew East: David Lovell Publishing, ISBN 9781863551298
- 2014, Australian Catholic Lives, Kew East, Vic: David Lovell Publishing, ISBN 9781863551458
- 2016, Swifty: A Life of Yvonne Swift, Sydney: NewSouth Publishing, ISBN 9781742234755
- 2021, Then and Now: Australian Catholic Experiences, Adelaide: ATF Press, ISBN 9781922582614
