= Ted Kennedy (priest) =

Australian priest and activist

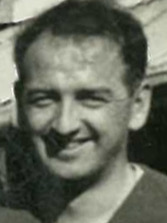
- Kennedy in 1963
- Born: Edward Phillip Kennedy; 27 January 1931; Marrickville, New South Wales, Australia
- Died: 27 May 2005 (aged 73); Redfern, New South Wales, Australia
- Education: Marrickville Catholic School St Columba's College, Springwood St Patrick's College, Manly
- Occupations: Priest
- Employer(s): Catholic Church
- Known for: Social activism, especially for Indigenous people Liturgical reform within the Catholic Church (Vatican II) Practise of the corporal works of mercy

Edward Phillip "Ted" Kennedy OAM (27 January 1931 – 17 May 2005) was an Australian priest and activist. He was best known as the parish priest of St Vincent's Roman Catholic church in the Sydney inner-city suburb of Redfern, where he commenced his ministry in 1971. The Redfern Catholic presbytery under Kennedy was an open house for the many Indigenous members of his parish and beyond.

== Early life, education, and ordination ==
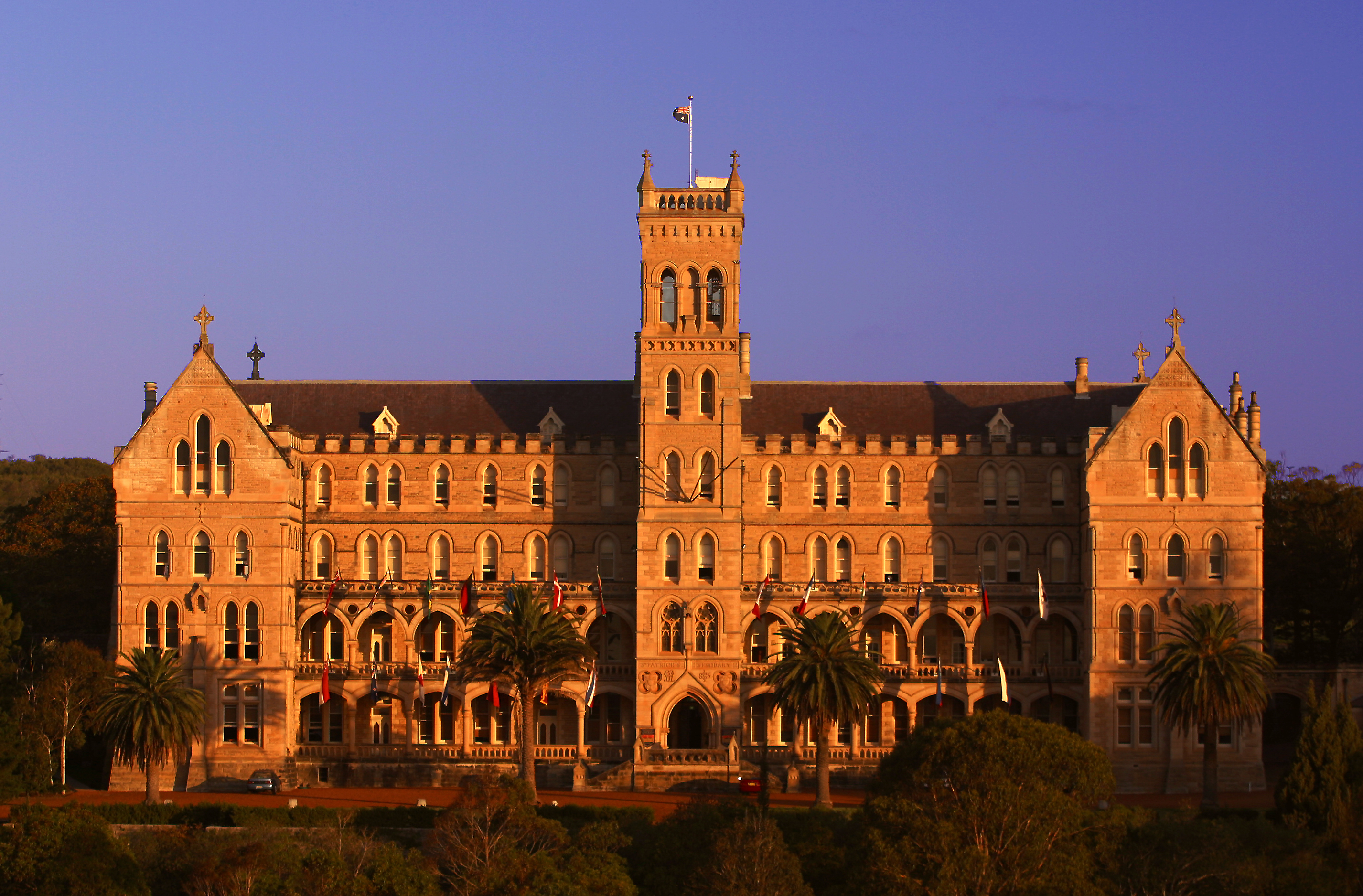
St Patrick's College, Manly

Edward Phillip Kennedy was born on 27 January 1931, the son of Jack and Peg Kennedy. His father was a general practitioner in Marrickville, where Kennedy grew up and gained a Catholic education.

He entered St Columba's College, Springwood, to study for the Catholic priesthood at the age of 16. He later continued his studies at St Patrick's Seminary, Manly. Though a cleric himself, he professed to be strongly anticlerical - an attitude he attributed to his mother, who disdained many clerics because of their pomposity and self-importance. He was a harsh critic of the Tridentine seminary system and its objectives, to which he had been subjected, and lamented the lifelong bad effects it had on so many of his brother priests.

== Ministry and church work ==
After his ordination and before he went to Redfern, Kennedy worked in the Sydney parish of Ryde, where he sought to improve the standard of liturgy and music. He later served at Punchbowl, Elizabeth Bay, and Neutral Bay parishes.

For seven years he was also chaplain to the students at the University of Sydney. From 1957 to 1962, with Roger Pryke and others, he was a participant in a series of lectures for nuns at Sancta Sophia College within Sydney University. The lecture team included Bede Heather, Grove Johnson, Brian and Paul Crittenden, Terry Johns, Ron Hine, David Coffey, Mary Lewis, and Mary Shanahan. These lectures introduced the sisters to the coming reforms of the Second Vatican Council.

=== Catholic hymnody ===
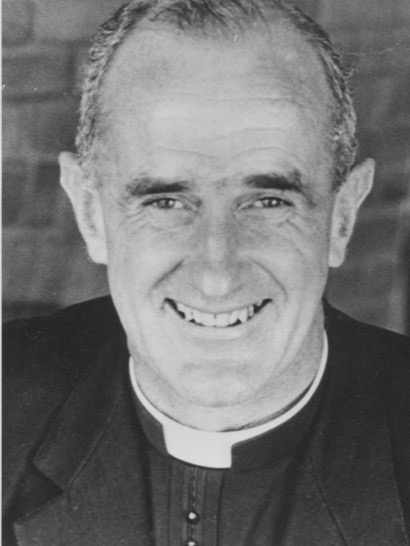
Roger Pryke in 1963

On 5 March 1967 the second Vatican Council had promulgated the Schema on Sacred Music, advocating that music be restored as an essential component of the Catholic liturgy. Partly through Kennedy's introduction and encouragement, composer Richard Connolly and poet and academic James McAuley became involved in creating suitable and appealing Australian Catholic hymns, especially for various sections of the Mass.

Thus began one of the most successful hymn-making teams of the 20th century in Australia. Their work would result in the Living Parish hymnbook, published by a group around Fr Roger Pryke and Fr Tony Newman, which sold around one million copies over the next decade, enabling congregations to sing hymns during the liturgy in an Australian voice.

=== Redfern ===
Kennedy arrived in Redfern in 1971, appointed to head a team ministry by the then Archbishop of Sydney, James Freeman (later a cardinal), with colleagues John Butcher and Fergus Breslan. He served as parish priest in Redfern continuously under archbishops Edward Bede Clancy and George Pell. (Note: This remains unusual by contemporary diocesan standards which limit the duration of tenure.) By 1974, Kennedy was the only priest at the Redfern parish.

The Redfern area has a significant Aboriginal population. Kennedy was initially somewhat insensitive to Aboriginal Australians, but over time he identified with the many social problems and challenges the Aboriginal community faced, and worked to bring justice to them. His presbytery and church community became a place of refuge for Indigenous Australians travelling from all parts of the nation. He befriended Aboriginal activist Mum Shirl and worked closely with her until she died in 1998. Around 1973, he was an active participant in a group lobbying the federal government to award grants to the Aboriginal Housing Company to purchase and manage housing for Aboriginal people in the area known as The Block.

Author and former Jesuit Peter Norden recalls that on wet nights up to one hundred people slept at the St Vincent de Paul catholic presbytery. It became known as the "people's home".

Kennedy promoted reparation and reconciliation with Indigenous Australians. Through his personal contacts, he established networks of influence through the local community and the Indigenous communities of the nation. He preached and taught against what he perceived as exclusion and marginalisation of all kinds, whether because of race, income or sexual orientation. Progressive Catholics from all over Sydney travelled to Redfern weekly to be part of the parish community.

While Kennedy was at Redfern, the South Sydney Uniting Church donated property to the Black Theatre and the Sisters of Mercy gave property to the Redfern Aboriginal community in 1978 in which the Aboriginal Medical Service was established.

== Activism ==
Kennedy's example of personal poverty and commitment influenced other people and organisations. In 1975, Frank Brennan SJ worked at Redfern with Kennedy and thus began a lifelong connection and influence.

In 2001, his work received direct support from Pope John Paul II with the reception of a letter to Naomi Mayers, CEO of the Aboriginal Medical Service, supporting their work at the Aboriginal medical centre. On 22 November 2001, the Pope issued the apostolic exhortation Ecclesia in Oceania in which he referred to "the shameful injustices done to indigenous peoples in Oceania" and to the "special case" of the "Australian Aborigines whose culture struggles to survive".

Kennedy was a controversial figure and not all Catholics or all Australians supported his radical views. He was often in conflict with the church hierarchy for his activism. He once described himself as "a sample of that endangered species – an Australian Catholic priest".

In 2000 Kennedy published a book, Who is Worthy: The role of conscience in restoring hope to the Church, in response to controversy in the Archdiocese of Sydney over the proper role of individual conscience. This was a public debate triggered by comments from Cardinal George Pell, who had argued that the "doctrine of the primacy of conscience should be quietly ditched, at least in our schools, or comprehensively restated" largely because of his concerns that too many liberties were being taken in a society that overemphasised the philosophy of individualism. But Kennedy was focused on what he considered was the chief problem of clericalism. In the book he argued that the Australian church has corrupted the basic teachings of Christ and has become a church of exclusion rather than inclusion, so that a process of reformation was required.

== Recognition and honours ==
In the 2001 Australia Day Honours, Kennedy was award a Medal of the Order of Australia, for his service to the Aboriginal community.

== Later life and death ==
After two major strokes, Kennedy retired in 2002. After retirement, despite his illness, he kept in close contact with the people of Redfern. He died at Concord Hospital, Sydney, on 17 May 2005. Approximately 1,500 people, including "seventy priests, three bishops and one cardinal", attended his funeral on 24 May.
