= Rodney L. Cool =

American physicist

Rodney Lee Cool (March 8, 1920 – April 16, 1988) was an American physicist who helped to establish the existence of the quark. Cool was a professor of high-energy physics at Rockefeller University, a member of the National Academies of Sciences. He was also a Fellow of the American Physical Society. Cool founded an experimental physics group at Rockefeller University in 1970.

== Life and career ==
Cool graduated with a bachelor's degree from the University of South Dakota and received his M.S. and Ph.D. degrees from Harvard University. He also worked at European Organization for Nuclear Research in Geneva. There he and his colleagues performed experiments that showed the quark to be a building block of neutrons and protons.
