= Clement Pryke =

English-American physicist (born 1968)

Clement Laurence Pryke (born 1968 in Wallasey, Cheshire, UK) is an English-American physicist, focusing in astrophysics and cosmology, particularly on the cosmic microwave background.

== Education and career ==
Pryke worked from 1988 to 1989 as a research assistant at Thorn EMI Central Research Labs in the UK. He graduated in physics from the University of Leeds in 1992 with a B.Sc. and in 1996 with a Ph.D. His Ph.D. thesis Instrumentation development and experimental design for a next generation detector of the highest energy cosmic rays was supervised by Alan Andrew Watson. At the Enrico Fermi Institute of the University of Chicago, Pryke was from 1996 to 1999 a McCormick Fellow, from 1999 to 2000 a research scientist, and from 2001 to 2002 a senior research associate. From 2002 to 2010 he was an assistant professor in the department of astronomy and astrophysics of the University of Chicago. In the department of physics and astronomy of the University of Minnesota, he was from 2010 to 2018 an associate professor and is since 2018 a full professor.

Pryke was elected in 2016 a Fellow of the American Physical Society, "for groundbreaking measurement and data analyses of the polarization of cosmic microwave background radiation, and for using the data to provide strong constraints on the composition and initial conditions of the early universe". He was involved with the Degree Angular Scale Interferometer (DASI), and QUaD microwave background polarization experiments, and is currently co-PI of the BICEP and Keck Array collaboration.
