= Ecclesia in Oceania =

2001 apostolic exhortation by Pope John Paul II

Ecclesia in Oceania Latin for 'The Church in Oceania' Apostolic exhortation of Pope John Paul II
- Signature date: 22 November 2001
- Number: 13 of 15 of the pontificate
- Text: In English

Ecclesia in Oceania (English: The Church in Oceania) is a post-synodal apostolic exhortation written by Pope John Paul II, published on 22 November 2001. It follows the 1998 Special Assembly for Oceania of the Synod of Bishops.
