= Richard Connolly (composer) =

Australian musician (1927–2022)

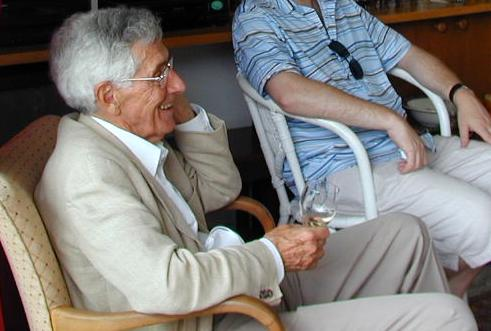
- Connolly in 2003

Background information
- Born: 10 November 1927; Sydney, Australia
- Origin: University of Sydney
- Died: 4 May 2022 (aged 94); Sydney, Australia
- Genres: Christian, secular
- Occupations: Musician, composer, broadcaster
- Years active: 1956-
- Formerly of: James McAuley

Richard Connolly (10 November 1927 – 4 May 2022) was an Australian musician, composer and former broadcaster. A well travelled man, who had studied broadcasters and broadcasting in numerous countries including France, Italy and German under the Churchill Fellowship program. He had a long association with the Australian Broadcasting Corporation, as a writer/composer for radio and television programs, but also wrote for documentaries and films.

It was whilst working with the education department of the ABC, that he composed the theme song to the children's TV series Play School, in which he also sang the lyrics penned by Dr. Rosemary Milne. In 2017 the tune was added to the National Film and Sound Archive in the list of the top 10 Sounds of Australia for "being culturally, historically and aesthetically significant".

Connolly's published and performed works allowed him to be counted among Australia's most prolific composers of Catholic Church music, particularly the hymns he composed for the church in Australia which are now published and used inter-denominationally. His hymns were composed to accommodate and adorn the liturgical reforms of the Second Vatican Council.

He was noted for his collaborations with Australian poet James McAuley. His compositions were successful internationally, both in the Christian and secular fields.

== Life and career ==
Connolly was born in Granville, New South Wales as one of eight and grew up in a Catholic family in Guildford. A fluent speaker of latin, he aspired to join the priesthood and, from 1946 and 1950, pursued theological studies in Rome. A few months before his planned ordination, however, he abandoned his studies and returned to Australia where he completed an arts degree at the University of Sydney. At that time, he was a member of Holy Spirit parish in North Ryde. In 1955, he was introduced to McAuley by Father Ted Kennedy who asked Connolly to compose hymns to sing at various points during Mass. Thus began a longstanding partnership between McAuley and Connolly. Their subsequent musical collaboration during the 1950s and 1960s contributed significantly to contemporary Australian hymnody. Their compositions were first released in a collection titled Hymns for the Year of Grace in 1963. In 1960 Connolly's work had anchored the Living Parish hymnbook, edited by Tony Newman and published by a group gathered around Roger Pryke, which would sell one million copies over the next decade, enabling congregations to sing hymns in a distinctively Australian voice. Many of the hymns published in both collections are still widely sung across various Christian denominations in Australia and internationally.

Connolly joined the ABC in 1956 and by 1960 worked in its education department, mainly in schools broadcasts. In 1967 he joined the Radio Drama and Features Department, becoming features editor. In 1971 he undertook a Churchill Fellowship in Italy and at Radio France and Bayerischer Rundfunk. He also spent several months working in the BBC's radio drama script unit. During this time, he also composed music for the BBC TV series The British Empire. He returned to Australia and was appointed Head of Radio Drama and Features at the ABC.

Connolly composed music for the first Australian visit of a pope, Pope Paul VI, at both Randwick Racecourse and St Mary's Cathedral, Sydney. For the cathedral's liturgy he composed a "papal entry and march" version of Psalm 85. In 1844, the bishops of Australia had chosen the Virgin Mary, under the title of "Mary, Help of Christians", as patroness for the Australian nation, and the words are nationalistically resonant for Australian Catholics. While he personally remained largely aloof from Catholic politics, Connolly's setting of these words in his hymn "Help of Christians, Guard this Land" became the battle hymn of the Catholic Right in Australia in the 1950s and 1960s.

In December 2009, he was awarded the honorary degree of Doctor of Arts by the University of Notre Dame Australia in recognition of his "extraordinary contributions to Catholic liturgical music in Australia". In his acceptance speech he said the hymns he had made with James McAuley were "the centrepiece of my liturgical work and, of all the things that I have made, apart from my family, the best".

Connolly fell ill prior to his ninetieth birthday on 10 November 2017, which he celebrated with his family at Sydney's Royal North Shore Hospital, but made a full recovery. He died in Sydney on 4 May 2022, aged 94.

== Contributions ==
=== Hymnody ===
A few of his hymn tunes have particularly Australian names. Connolly's tunes include the following:

- Araluen (In Faith and Hope and Love)
- Camilla (Help of Christians)
- Catherine (Holy Father, God of Might)
- (Come Lord Jesus)
- Cosmic Praise (Sing a new song)
- Forbes Street (O Jesus crucified)
- Helen (From many grapes and grains of wheat)
- Jeremy (Where there is Charity and love)
- Lindfield (May this Lenten discipline)
- Newtown (Come O Jesus)
- Sancta Sophia (Jesus in your heart we find)
- Ruggiero (By your kingly power)
- Sandy Bay (Father, we praise you)
- Travalli (By your priestly power)
- Venantius (Seek, O seek the Lord),

=== Liturgical music ===
- 1967-68 "Go teach all nations" (Mass for schola, choir, organ, tympany and brass consort) for the Christian Brothers' Centenary Year, Sydney 1968
- Psalm 85 ('Song of the Church') – choir unison, organ and brass consort
- Give us Peace Mass (Congregational)
- 2002 Mass of St John the Apostle dedicated to the people of St John the Apostle Parish, Narraweena (Congregational)
- 2005, Missa Pax et Bonum; a choral and congregational Mass dedicated to the pastors, musicians and people of St Francis of Assisi Parish, Paddington, NSW, Australia (SATB Choir, 2 trumpets, 2 trombones and organ)
- 2007 Mass of Our Lady Help of Christians (congregational)
- 2009 Mass "Common Things Divinely" (congregational). Published by Willow Publishing.
- 2010 Mass, Notre Dame. Published by Willow Publishing.
- 2012 Year of Grace. Published by Willow Publishing
- 2015 Psalms - Praise the Lord My Soul, 35 Psalm Settings for Sundays, Seasons, Feasts & Australian Occasions. Published by Willow Publishing.
- 2017 Motet Mater Boni Consilii (SATB Choir)

=== Secular music ===
- "There's A Bear in There!" - the Play School theme for ABC TV known by generations of Australians.
