= Haverah Park experiment =

Coordinates: 53.9703417°N 1.6385028°W

The Haverah Park experiment was a cosmic ray air shower detection array consisting of water Cherenkov detectors distributed over an area of 12 km^{2} on Haverah Park on the Pennine moorland near Harrogate, North Yorkshire. The experiment was operated by University of Leeds for 20 years, and was switched off in 1987.

Air showers of secondary particles generated from a primary cosmic ray hitting the Earth's atmosphere are spread over many kilometres when they hit the ground. An array allows for detection of secondary particles caused by a single cosmic ray at several detectors. The geographic spread of the detectors allows for calculation of the following:

- The total number of particles detected can be used to estimate the number of particles in the air shower and from the model of the energy required to generate those particles, the energy of the primary cosmic ray.
- The difference in the time of arrival of recorded particles at multiple detectors can be used to estimate the arrival direction of the primary cosmic ray.

During its operation, many thousands of cosmic ray events were recorded, including four exceptional events with energies over 10^{20} eV. These results were somewhat controversial because they are beyond the GZK limit. Such particles were later observed by other experiments, such as Fly's Eye (Oh-My-God particle) and AGASA.
