= Atsuto Suzuki =

- 鈴木 厚人
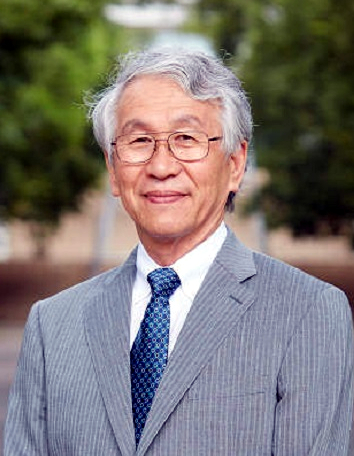
- Atsuhito Suzuki
- Born: October 3, 1946 (age 79)
- Education: Tohoku University (Ph.D. 1974)
- Awards: Asahi Prize (1987, 1998); Bruno Rossi Prize (1989); Medal of Honor (2005); Bruno Pontecorvo Prize (2006); Breakthrough Prize in Fundamental Physics (2016)
- Scientific career
- Institutions: Tohoku University; Tōkyō University; KEK
- Doctoral advisor: Masatoshi Koshiba

Atsuto Suzuki (鈴木 厚人, Suzuki Atsuto; born October 3, 1946, in Niigata Prefecture, Japan) is an experimental particle physicist known for his observations of neutrinos and anti-neutrinos.

== Career ==
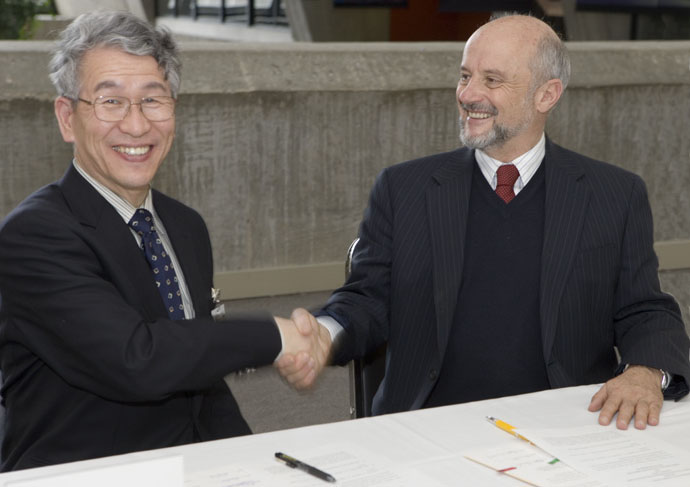
With Piermaria Oddone (April, 2007)

Suzuki earned his doctorate from Tohoku University in 1974, supervised by Masatoshi Koshiba. In 1982 he was appointed to the faculty of the Tōkyō University. In 1993, he took concurrent positions as professor at the High Energy Physics Laboratory of Tohoku University and professor at the Institute of Cosmic Ray Research (ICRR) of Tōkyō University. Having taken part in the Kamiokande-II and Super-Kamiokande neutrino detection experiments, Suzuki was appointed Director of the Research Center for Neutrino Science in 1998 and led the KamLAND neutrino detection experiments. From 2006 until 2015 he was Director General of the High Energy Accelerator Research Organization (KEK) Accelerator Laboratory. Suzuki chaired the International Committee for Future Accelerators, a working group of the International Union of Pure and Applied Physics, from 2009 to 2011.

== Scientific achievements ==
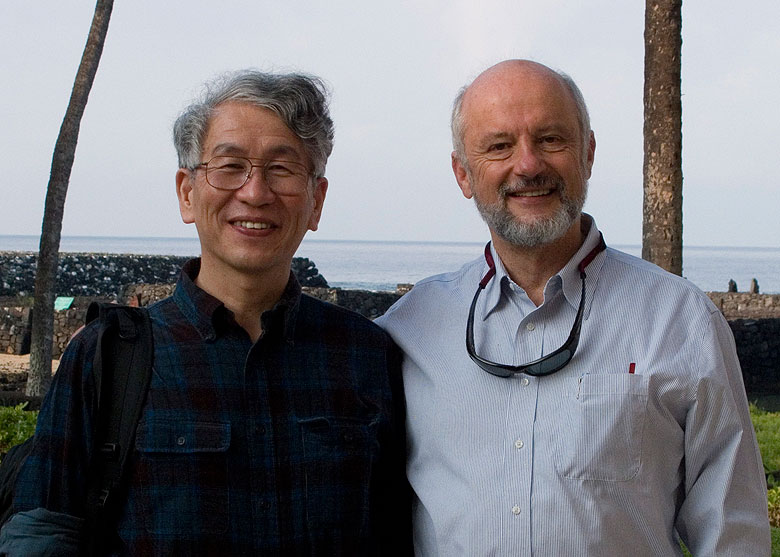
With Piermaria Oddone (October, 2010)

The Kamiokande-II experiment detected a burst of neutrinos from Supernova 1987A, the first observation of this kind, winning the research team the Asahi and Bruno Rossi prizes.

Observations from the Super-Kamiokande experiment measured the phenomenon of neutrino oscillation (and hence neutrino mass) with unprecedented accuracy, thereby resolving the solar neutrino problem. For this accomplishment, the project was awarded the 1998 Asahi Prize.

The KamLAND experiment was the first to detect geoneutrinos generated by the decay of radionuclides deep inside Earth.

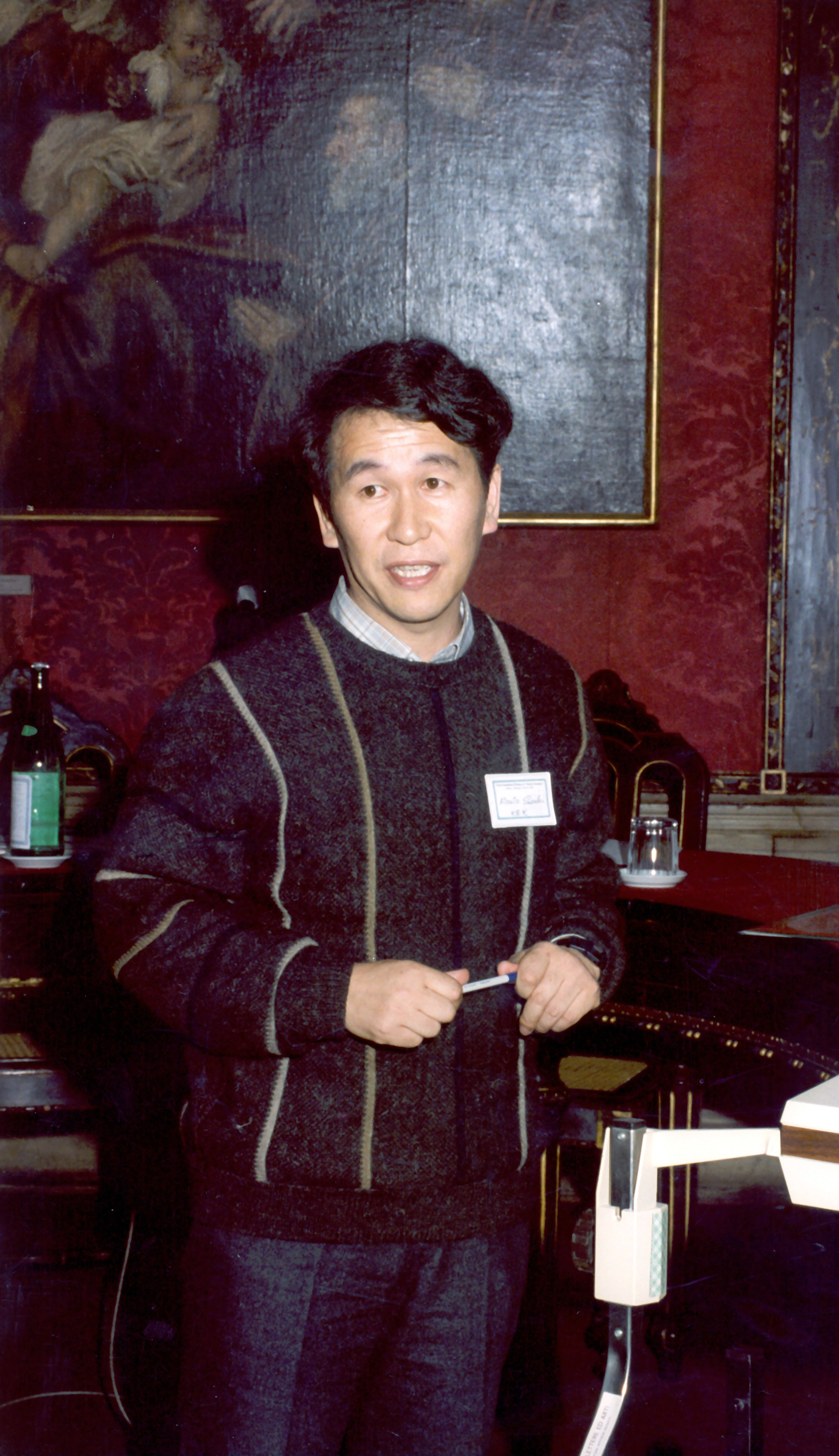
Atsuto Suzuki talking about solar neutrinos at the Neutrino Telescopes Workshop, Venice, 1990

These observations provided the first direct measurements of the abundance of geoneutrino-producing elements and their spatial distribution in Earth's interior, marking the start of a new field of neutrino geoscience.

== Awards ==
Suzuki received the Japanese Medal of Honor with purple ribbon in 2005, the Bruno Pontecorvo Prize in 2006, and the Breakthrough Prize in Fundamental Physics in 2016, shared with investigators from the KamLAND, Super-Kamiokande, K2K / T2K, Daya Bay, and Sudbury neutrino observation consortia. He was elected a foreign member of the Russian Academy of Sciences in 2011.

In 2021, he was elected as a Person of Cultural Merit.

In 2022, he was elected as a Members of the Japan Academy.
