= Yoji Totsuka =

Japanese physicist

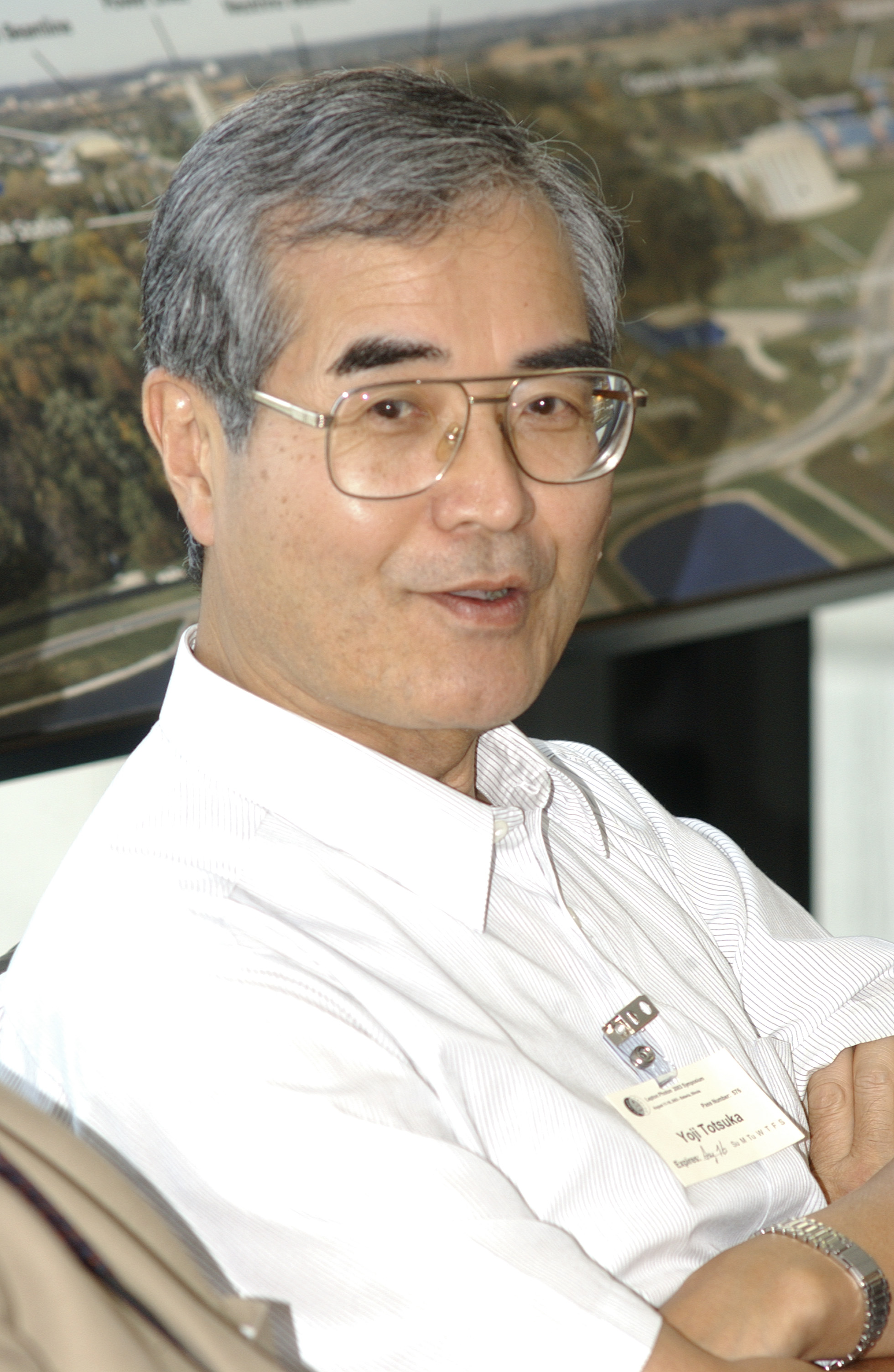
- Born: 6 March 1942
- Died: 10 July 2008
- Education: University of Tokyo
- Employers: DESY; KEK; Kamioka Observatory; Super-Kamiokande; University of Tokyo
- Awards: Order of Culture (2004); Franklin Institute Awards (2007); Asahi Prize (1998); Panofsky Prize (2002); Nishina Memorial Prize (1987); Clarivate Citation Laureates (physics, 2007)

Yoji Totsuka (戸塚 洋二, Totsuka Yōji; March 6, 1942 – July 10, 2008) was a Japanese physicist and Special University Professor, emeritus, University of Tokyo. A leader in the study of solar and atmospheric neutrinos, he was a scientist and director at Kamioka Observatory, Super-Kamiokande and the High Energy Physics Laboratory (KEK) in Japan.

Totsuka helped to discover neutrino oscillation and neutrino mass, laying a foundation for the international study of neutrinos.

== Early life ==
Totsuka was born March 6, 1942, in Fuji, Shizuoka Prefecture. He completed his B.S. in 1965, his M.S. in 1967 and his Ph.D. in 1972 from the University of Tokyo under the direction of Masatoshi Koshiba.

== Career ==
Totsuka held the position of research associate at the University of Tokyo from 1972 to 1979. He was an associate professor of the University of Tokyo from 1979 to 1987, and was promoted to full professor at the University of Tokyo in 1987. From 1972 to 1981 he also worked with the Double Arm Spectrometer (DASP) and JADE particle detector experiments at Deutsches Electron Synchrotron (DESY) in Hamburg, Germany. There he investigated electron–positron collisions.

In 1981, Totsuka returned from Germany to Japan to work at the Kamioka Observatory, part of the Institute for Cosmic Ray Research (ICRR) at the University of Tokyo. He worked with Masatoshi Koshiba to establish the Kamioka Nucleon Decay Experiment. In 1987, both the Kamiokande detector and the Irvine–Michigan–Brookhaven detector in the United States were able to detect a burst of neutrinos from the explosion of a supernova in the Large Magellanic Cloud. This event, considered to be "the birth of neutrino astronomy", led to the publication of significant results from the Kamioka detector and in 2002 the sharing of a Nobel Prize in Physics between Masatoshi Koshiba and Raymond Davis Jr. for the detection of cosmic neutrinos.

Totsuka was a full professor in the Institute for Cosmic Ray Research (ICRR) at the University of Tokyo from 1988‐2002. In 1988, after Masatoshi Koshiba retired, Totsuka took his place as organizer and spokesperson of a core group of researchers to promote an expanded Cherenkov detector, the Super-Kamiokande (Super-K) experiment. In 1991 the Japanese government approved a budget for construction of Super-Kamiokande, and construction began. An underground detector containing 50,000 tons of water, beneath Ikenoyama (Mount Ikeno), it began operation on 1 April 1996. Subsequent work at Super-Kamiokande provided the first definitive experimental evidence for atmospheric neutrino oscillations (1998) and solar neutrino oscillations (2001). This explained the apparent solar neutrino deficit and established the existence of neutrino mass.

From 1995‐2002, Totsuka served as the director of the Kamioka Observatory, part of the Institute for Cosmic Ray Research (ICRR) at the University of Tokyo. From 1997‐2001, Totsuka served as director of ICRR, while continuing as the director of Kamioka Observatory. Following an accident that destroyed over half of the Super-K photomultiplier tubes on 12 November 2001, Totsuka provided key leadership for reconstruction of the detector.

From 2002 to 2003, Totsuka was a professor at High Energy Accelerator Research Organization (KEK). From 2003‐2006, Totsuka served as the director general of KEK where he supervised the K2K neutrino-oscillation experiment and the Belle B-factory. From 2006‐2008, he served as Director of the Research Center for Science Systems of the Japan Society for the Promotion of Science.

== Research ==
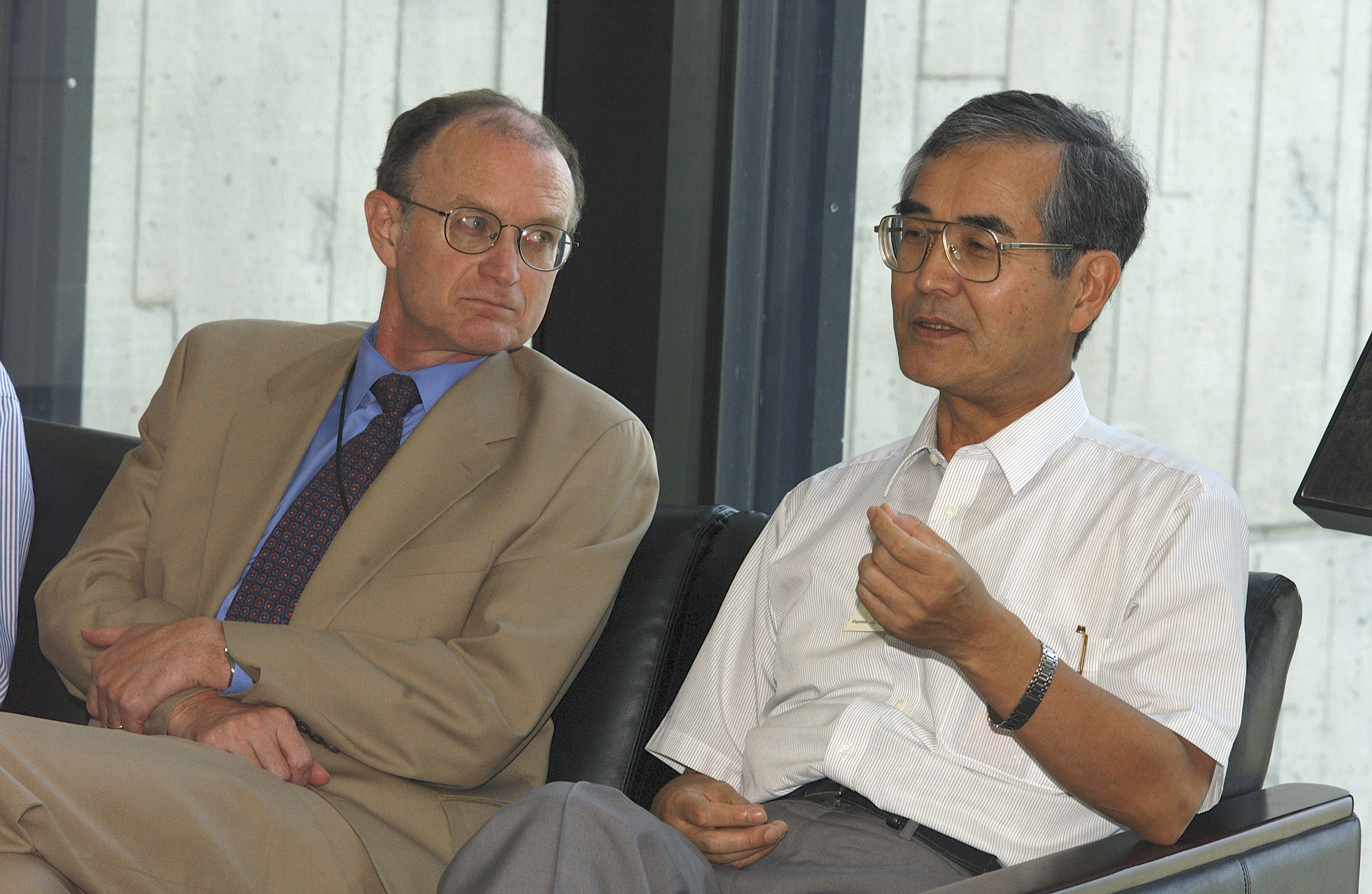
With Michael Witherell, August 2003

Working with Nobel prize winner Masatoshi Koshiba on the Kamioka Nucleon Decay Experiment and later as leader of the Kamioka Observatory and the Super-Kamiokande (Super-K) experiment, Totsuka helped to establish the foundations of neutrino physics.

The Kamioka Nucleon Decay Experiment was designed to detect proton decay. It established strict limits on the proton-decay process, and could detect low-energy neutrinos coming from the Sun as well as atmospheric neutrinos produced by cosmic rays. As a result, Kamioka was one of two locations on Earth to successfully measure the release of neutrinos from a cosmogenic source, when the supernova SN 1987A exploded in the Large Magellanic Cloud. The other location to detect the burst of neutrinos was the Irvine–Michigan–Brookhaven (IMB) detector in the US. As the first detection of neutrinos from beyond the Solar System, the event was hailed as the birth of neutrino astronomy. More than 800 publication have analyzed the data from the Kamioka detector relating to that event.

Among the new research were two major findings from the Totsuka group. One related to the solar neutrino deficit. Solar neutrinos were detected by Raymond Davis Jr., but at one-third of the level of neutrino flux that was predicted by theoretician John N. Bahcall. The data from Kamiokande crucially confirmed the existence of the solar neutrino problem posed by the work of Davis and Bahcall.

In addition, the Kamiokande researchers realized that their data showed a deficit in atmospheric neutrinos that could not be explained away by experimental errors or background neutrino flux. Both atmospheric and solar neutrinos were fewer than the Standard Model of particle physics would predict. Totsuka and his group published the first paper on the atmospheric neutrino anomaly in 1988, a result that would require "as-yet-unaccounted-for physics" to explain.

Under Totsuka's leadership, the success of Kamiokande led to the building of the Super-Kamiokande (Super-K) detector, which opened in 1996. In 1998, the Super-Kamiokande collaboration reported the first definitive evidence for atmospheric neutrino oscillations, at the Eighteenth International Conference on Neutrino Physics and Astrophysics, in Takayama, Japan. The Super-Kamiokande experiment found evidence for neutrino oscillations through a combination of high-precision measurement and sophisticated statistical modeling of atmospheric neutrino flux.

Neutrino oscillation involves three types of neutrinos, which can convert between types: electron neutrinos, muon neutrinos and tau neutrinos. Atmospheric neutrinos tend to be muon and electron neutrinos, which can pass through the Earth without being absorbed. It was predicted that the similar numbers of atmospheric neutrinos would come up from the ground and down from the sky. However, Super-Kamiokande found that while equal numbers of electron neutrinos went up and down, fewer muon neutrinos came up than down. A possible explanation was that muon neutrinos that passed through the earth spent more time traveling than those from the atmosphere, and had more time to change into tau neutrinos, which Super-Kamiokande did not directly detect. Analysis showed that muon neutrinos were oscillating into tau neutrinos.

The evidence for neutrino oscillation also suggested a possible explanation for the solar neutrino deficit: earlier detectors were not capable of measuring tau and muon neutrinos. The solar electron neutrinos that were predicted to exist but were "missing" from earlier observations might have been converted from electron neutrinos to tau and muon neutrinos. This was later confirmed through a collaboration between Super-Kamiokande and the Sudbury Neutrino Observatory (SNO) in Canada, reported in 2001, by comparing data collected by the two facilities.

The measurement of neutrino oscillations at a high level of precision was a critical chapter in the history of particle physics. Oscillation arose from the fact that neutrinos had small but finite mass. Neutrino oscillations, and thus the existence of neutrino mass, are not a prediction made by the Standard Model of particle physics. Indeed, the Standard Model requires that neutrinos are massless.

In addition, as the Director General at KEK, Totsuka successfully oversaw the K2K experiment and the Belle B-meson "factory", exploring differences between matter and antimatter.

== Personal life ==
Totsuka was diagnosed with colorectal cancer and underwent surgery for it in 2000. In 2006, after cancer spread to his lung, he retired from his position at KEK, but served as a director of research at the Japan Society for the Promotion of Science. Totsuka died on July 10, 2008. Nobel Prize winning physicist Masatoshi Koshiba was told that if Totsuka could extend his lifespan by eighteen months, he must receive the prize.

In 2015, the evidence provided by the 1998 and 2001 experiments resulted in a Nobel Prize for Physics, given to Takaaki Kajita from the Super-Kamiokande Observatory and Arthur McDonald from the Sudbury Neutrino Observatory (SNO) "for the discovery of neutrino oscillations, which shows that neutrinos have mass".

Towards the end of his life, Totsuka turned his attention to communicating with the Japanese public about his illness, science, and culture. He maintained a blog, The Fourth Three-Months, where he candidly discussed the extent, progress, and treatment of his cancer. Totsuka also revealed an interest in gardening, particularly the flowers in the area where he spent much of his career, in Mozumi, the village where Super-K is located.

== Recognition ==
- 2007, Benjamin Franklin Medal in Physics
- 2004, Order of Culture
- 2002, Panofsky Prize
- 1995, EPS Special Prize, European Physical Society
- 1990, Inoue Prize for Science
- 1989, Bruno Rossi Prize, (American Astronomical Society)
- 1988, Nishina Memorial Prize
- 1987, Asahi Prize

== See also ==
- Masatoshi Koshiba
- Takaaki Kajita
- Katsuhiko Sato (physicist)
