= 2002 in science =

The year 2002 in science and technology involved some significant events.

== Astronomy and space science ==
- February 19 – NASA's 2001 Mars Odyssey space probe begins to map the surface of Mars using its thermal emission imaging system.
- May 26 – The Mars Odyssey finds signs of huge water ice deposits on the planet Mars.
- June 4 – The ringed dwarf planet Quaoar is discovered by astronomers Chad Trujillo and Michael Brown at the Palomar Observatory.
- June 6 – 2002 Eastern Mediterranean event: An object with an estimated diameter of 10 meters impacts with Earth's atmosphere over the Mediterranean and detonates in mid-air.
- June 10 – Solar eclipse of June 10, 2002: Annular solar eclipse.
- September 25 – 2002 Vitim event: Possible bolide impact in Irkutsk Oblast, Russia.
- December 4 – Solar eclipse of December 4, 2002: Total solar eclipse.

== Biology ==
- 1 March – DNA barcoding of the dodo is published, confirming it as a member of the Columbidae family.
- 18 April – New suborder of insects, Mantophasmatidae, announced.
- Publication of Systema Porifera: a guide to the classification of sponges edited by John N. A. Hooper and Rob W. M. Van Soest.

== Cartography ==
- Hobo–Dyer projection commissioned.

== Computer science and cybernetics ==
- January 7 – The iMac G4 is introduced by Apple, Inc., as the next generation iMac.
- March 14 – Prof. Kevin Warwick of the University of Reading in England has part of his nervous system experimentally linked to a computer. On June 10, he demonstrates the first direct electronic communication between the nervous systems of two humans.
- September 20 – Release of the Tor anonymity network is announced.
- September 23 – The first version of the web browser Firefox is released by the Mozilla Organization.
- October 1 – The Danger Hiptop is released, the first smartphone to incorporate instant messaging.

== Earth sciences ==
- January 17 – Eruption of Mount Nyiragongo in the Democratic Republic of the Congo, displacing an estimated 400,000 people.

== Mathematics ==
- August 6 – Polynomial-time primality test published.
- November 12 – Grigori Perelman posts the first of a series of eprints to the arXiv in which he proves the century-old Poincaré conjecture.

== Palaeoarchaeology ==
- Ciampate del Diavolo (early hominid footprints in Italy) come to scientific attention.

== Physics ==
- March 8 – Claims regarding bubble fusion, in which a table-top apparatus is reported as producing small-scale fusion in a liquid undergoing acoustic cavitation, are published.
- May – Experimental discovery of a new type of radioactivity: the 2-protons radioactivity.

== Physiology and medicine ==
- February – Intrinsically photosensitive retinal ganglion cells in the eye identified by Samer Hattar and colleagues.
- May 14 – Red wine is claimed by Spanish researchers to protect against the common cold.
- June – The gene BRAF is shown to be faulty (mutated) in some human cancers.
- November – Severe acute respiratory syndrome (SARS) epidemic begins in Guangdong province of China.
- December 19 – Clozapine is the first drug approved by the United States Food and Drug Administration for reducing the risk of suicidal behaviour.

== Technology ==
- November 4 – A Tactical High Energy Laser prototype shoots down an incoming artillery shell.
- Malcolm C. Smith introduces the inerter in the study of the mechanical network in control theory.

== Awards ==
- Fields Prize in Mathematics: Laurent Lafforgue and Vladimir Voevodsky
- Nobel Prizes
  - Chemistry
    - John B. Fenn (Virginia Commonwealth University, Richmond, USA) and Koichi Tanaka (Shimadzu Corp., Kyoto, Japan) "for their development of soft desorption ionisation methods for mass spectrometric analyses of biological macromolecules"
    - Kurt Wüthrich (Swiss Federal Institute of Technology (ETH), Zürich, Switzerland and The Scripps Research Institute, La Jolla, USA) "for his development of nuclear magnetic resonance spectroscopy for determining the three-dimensional structure of biological macromolecules in solution"
  - Physics
    - Raymond Davis Jr. (Department of Physics and Astronomy, University of Pennsylvania, Philadelphia, USA) and Masatoshi Koshiba (International Center for Elementary Particle Physics, University of Tokyo, Japan) "for pioneering contributions to astrophysics, in particular for the detection of cosmic neutrinos"
    - Riccardo Giacconi (Associated Universities Inc., Washington, D.C., USA) "for pioneering contributions to astrophysics, which have led to the discovery of cosmic X-ray sources"
  - Medicine
    - Sydney Brenner, H. Robert Horvitz and John E. Sulston "for their discoveries concerning genetic regulation of organ development and programmed cell death"
- Turing Award: Ron Rivest, Adi Shamir, and Leonard Adleman
- Wollaston Medal for Geology: Rudolf Trumpy

== Deaths ==
- January 8 – Alexander Prokhorov (b. 1916), physicist.
- February 6 – Max Perutz (b. 1914), biologist.
- February 10 – Harold Furth (b. 1930), expert in plasma physics and nuclear fusion.
- February 24 – David Hawkins (b. 1913), philosopher of science and mathematics and science educator.
- February 26 – Helen Megaw (b. 1907), crystallographer.
- March 3 – Roy Porter (b. 1946), medical historian.
- April 9 – Leopold Vietoris (b. 1891), mathematician.
- April 18 – Thor Heyerdahl (b. 1914), explorer, led the Kon-Tiki expedition.
- May 2 – W. T. Tutte (b. 1917), mathematician and cryptanalyst.
- May 20 – Stephen Jay Gould (b. 1941), paleontologist/evolutionist.
- June 20 – Erwin Chargaff (b. 1905), biochemist.
- June 29 – Ole-Johan Dahl (b. 1931), computer scientist, invented concepts in object-oriented programming.
- June 30 – W. Maxwell Cowan (b. 1931), neuroanatomist.
- July 4 – Laurent Schwartz (b. 1915), mathematician.
- August 6 – Edsger Dijkstra (b. 1930), computer scientist.
- August 31 – George Porter (b. 1920), Nobel laureate in chemistry.
- September 6 – Orvan Hess (b. 1906), obstetrician.
- September 21 – Robert Lull Forward (b. 1932), science fiction author and physicist.
- September 29 – Giuliana Tesoro (b. 1921), Italian-American organic chemist
- October 18 – Nikolai Rukavishnikov (b. 1932), cosmonaut.
- November 2 – Charles Sheffield (b. 1935), science fiction author and physicist.
- November 11 – Esther Somerfeld-Ziskind (b. 1901), neurologist and psychiatrist.
