= Yōichirō Suzuki =

Japanese elementary particle physicist (born 1952)

- 鈴木 洋一郎
- Born: 1952 (age 73–74); Tokyo, Japan
- Education: Kyōto University (Ph.D. 1979)
- Known for: Neutrino oscillation
- Awards: Asahi Prize (1999); Nishina Memorial Prize (2001); Bruno Pontecorvo Prize (2010); EPS Cocconi Prize (2013); Breakthrough Prize in Fundamental Physics (2016)
- Scientific career
- Fields: Experimental particle physics
- Institutions: ICRR and IPMU at Tōkyō University; Kamioka observatory
- Doctoral advisor: Kozo Miyake

Yōichirō Suzuki (Japanese: 鈴木 洋一郎, born 1952) is a Japanese experimental particle physicist, notable for his work on neutrinos.

== Early life ==
Suzuki was born and grew up in Tokyo. His father was a tailor.

== Career ==
Suzuki earned his Ph.D. in physics from Kyōto University in 1979 under Kozo Miyake. After postdoctoral work at Brown and Osaka University, he was appointed associate professor at the Institute for Cosmic Ray Research (ICRR) at Tōkyō University in 1989. He was promoted to professor in 1996 and became director of the institute in 2004. Suzuki was deputy director of the Kavli Institute for the Physics and Mathematics of the Universe (IPMU) at Tōkyō University from 2007 until March 2018. In addition, he has been director of the Kamioka observatory since 2002.

== Awards ==
During the 1990s, Suzuki was spokesperson and project leader for the Super Kamiokande collaboration that demonstrated neutrino oscillation. For these achievements he received the Asahi Prize in 1999 (as part of the Super Kamiokande team), the Nishina Memorial Prize in 2001, the Bruno Pontecorvo Prize in 2010, and the EPS Cocconi Prize in 2013 (with Arthur B. McDonald). In 2016, Suzuki and the Super Kamiokande team were awarded the Breakthrough Prize in Fundamental Physics together with other neutrino research consortia.
