= XMASS =

Tank of xenon

Xenon Massive Detector for Dark Matter Searches (XMASS) is a multipurpose physics experiment in Japan. It is a large cryogenic storage dewar, a tank of liquid xenon equipped with photosensors monitoring flashes of light that might be caused by interactions with hypothetical dark matter particles. Unlike a cryogenic particle detector, it operates at temperatures relatively far from absolute zero (specifically, 165 K (−163 °F)). In addition to searching for dark matter, XMASS is also studying neutrinoless double beta decay and solar neutrinos. The project is conducted by a team at Institute for Cosmic Ray Research, University of Tokyo.

Its results have not confirmed the annual variation seen in some earlier experiments.

== History ==
Construction started in April 2007. The detector was completed in September 2010. Commissioning run was conducted between October 2010 and June 2012. Scientific data taking begun in November 2013. The detector is sometimes called XMASS-I, as it is planned to be superseded by an upgrade called XMASS-1.5 (a 5-ton detector) and eventually XMASS-II (24 ton detector).

The XMASS-I experiment shut down and ceased data taking 20 February 2019.

Results were published in 2021.

== Detector ==
The detector is located 1000m underground in the Kamioka Observatory in Japan. It contains about 800 kg of xenon.

== See also ==
- Cryogenic Dark Matter Search – Physics exploration experiment
