= Totsuka =

Totsuka may refer to:

== Places ==
- Totsuka-ku, Yokohama, a ward of the city of Yokohama, Kanagawa Prefecture, Japan
- Totsuka Station, a railway station in Yokohama, Kanagawa Prefecture, Japan
- Totsuka, Shinjuku-ku, a part in the north of the Shinjuku ward, Tōkyō, Japan

== People ==
- Totsuka (surname)
