= ICRR =

ICRR may refer to:

- The Institute for Cosmic Ray Research of the University of Tokyo
- The Illinois Central Railroad
- The Inter-Capital and Regional Rail
