= Takaaki Kajita =

Japanese physicist

- 梶田 隆章
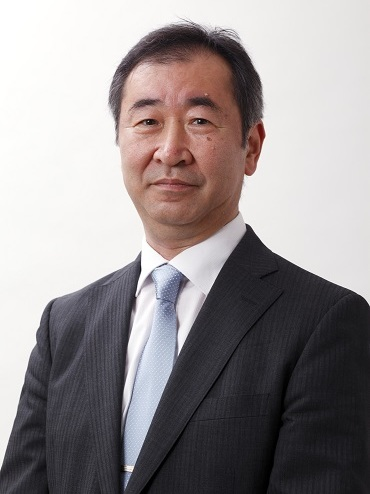
- Kajita in 2017
- Born: 9 March 1959 (age 67); Higashimatsuyama, Saitama, Japan
- Education: Saitama Prefectural Kawagoe High School
- Alma mater: Saitama University (BS); University of Tokyo (MS, PhD)
- Spouse: Michiko
- Awards: Asahi Prize (1988); Bruno Rossi Prize (1989); Nishina Memorial Prize (1999); Panofsky Prize (2002); Japan Academy Prize (2012); Nobel Prize in Physics (2015); Breakthrough Prize in Fundamental Physics (2016)
- Scientific career
- Workplaces: Kavli Institute for the Physics and Mathematics of the Universe, University of Tokyo
- Doctoral advisor: Masatoshi Koshiba
- Other academic advisors: Yoji Totsuka

Takaaki Kajita (梶田 隆章, Kajita Takaaki; Japanese pronunciation: [kadʑita takaːki]; born 9 March 1959) is a Japanese physicist, known for neutrino experiments at the Kamioka Observatory – Kamiokande and its successor, Super-Kamiokande. In 2015, he was awarded the Nobel Prize in Physics jointly with Canadian physicist Arthur B. McDonald for the discovery of neutrino oscillations. On 1 October 2020, he became the president of the Science Council of Japan.

== Early life and education ==
Kajita was born in march of 1959 in Higashimatsuyama, Saitama, Japan. He liked studying thought rather than memorizing, especially with interest in physics, biology, world history, Japanese history, and earth science in high school. He studied physics at Saitama University and graduated in 1981. He received his doctorate in 1986 at the University of Tokyo. At the University of Tokyo, he joined Masatoshi Koshiba's research group because neutrinos "seemed like they might be interesting."

== Career and research ==
Since 1988, Kajita has been at the Institute for Cosmic Radiation Research, University of Tokyo, where he became an assistant professor in 1992 and professor in 1999.

He became director of the Center for Cosmic Neutrinos at the Institute for Cosmic Ray Research (ICRR) in 1999. As of 2017, he is a Principal Investigator at the Institute for the Physics and Mathematics of the Universe in Tokyo, and Director of ICRR.

In 1998, Kajita's team at the Super-Kamiokande found that when cosmic rays hit the Earth's atmosphere, the resulting neutrinos switched between two flavours before they reached the detector under Mt. Kamioka. This discovery helped prove the existence of neutrino oscillation and that neutrinos have mass. In 2015, Kajita shared the Nobel Prize in Physics with Canadian physicist Arthur McDonald, whose Sudbury Neutrino Observatory discovered similar results. Kajita's and McDonald's work solved the longstanding Solar neutrino problem, which was a major discrepancy between the predicted and measured Solar neutrino fluxes, and indicated that the Standard Model, which required neutrinos to be massless, had weaknesses. In a news conference at the University of Tokyo, shortly after the Nobel announcement, Kajita said, "I want to thank the neutrinos, of course. And since neutrinos are created by cosmic rays, I want to thank them, too."

One of the first people Kajita called after receiving the Nobel Prize was 2002 Nobel physics laureate Masatoshi Koshiba, his former mentor and a fellow neutrino researcher.

Kajita served as chair of the commission on astroparticle physics (C4) of the International Union of Pure and Applied Physics in the period 2021–2024.

Kajita is currently the principal investigator of another ICRR project located at the Kamioka Observatory, the KAGRA gravitational wave detector.

== Recognition ==
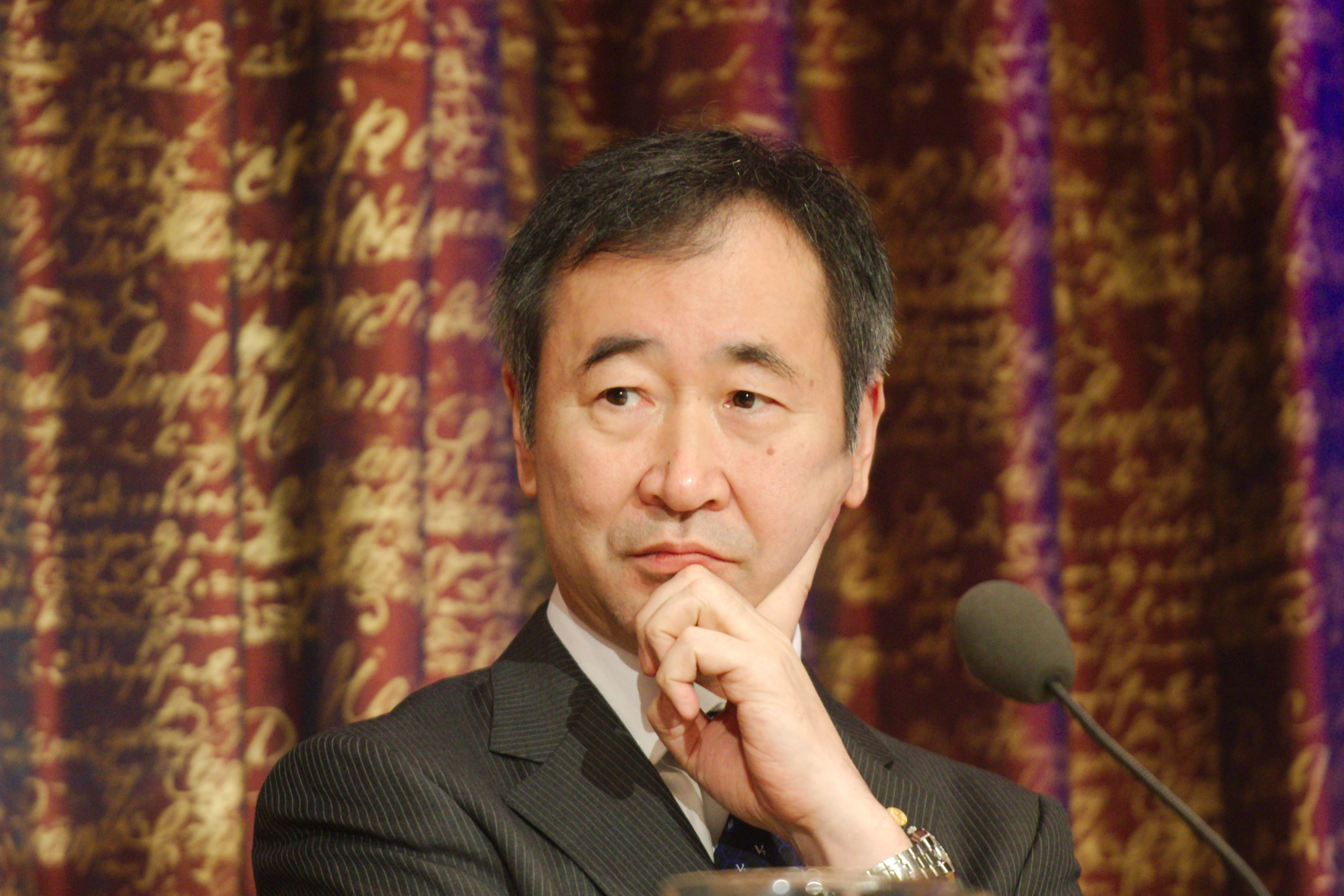
Kajita at a press conference at the Royal Swedish Academy of Sciences, 2015

=== Awards ===
- 1987 – Asahi Prize as part of Kamiokande (Representative – Masatoshi Koshiba)
- 1989 – Bruno Rossi Prize along with the other members of the Kamiokande collaboration
- 1998 – Asahi Prize as part of Super-Kamiokande (Representative – Yoji Totsuka)
- 1999 – Nishina Memorial Prize
- 2002 – Panofsky Prize for compelling experimental evidence for neutrino oscillations using atmospheric neutrinos
- 2010 – Yoji Totsuka Award
- 2012 – Japan Academy Prize for "Discovery of Atmospheric Neutrino Oscillations"
- 2013 – Julius Wess Award for his "significant role in the Discovery of Atmospheric Neutrino Oscillations with the Super-KAMIOKANDE Experiment."
- 2015 – Nobel Prize in Physics jointly with Arthur B. McDonald for the discovery of neutrino oscillations, which shows that neutrinos have mass.
- 2016 – Breakthrough Prize in Fundamental Physics
- 2016 – Asian Scientist 100, Asian Scientist
- 2019 – Homi Bhabha Medal and Prize

=== Honors ===
- 2015 – Order of Culture, Person of Cultural Merit
- 2016 – Doctorate in Science (DSc), Aligarh Muslim University, India
- 2016 – Honoris Causa Degree in Physics, University of Padua
- 2016 – Honoris Causa Degree, Higher University of San Andrés, La Paz, Bolivia.
- 2017 – Honoris Causa Degree in Physics, University of Naples Federico II
- 2017 – Honoris Causa Degree in Physics, University of Bern
- 2017 – Honoris Causa Degree in Physics, University of Perugia
- 2024 – Honorary Doctor of Science, University of Glasgow

== See also ==
- List of Japanese Nobel laureates
- List of Nobel laureates affiliated with the University of Tokyo
- Masatoshi Koshiba
- Yoji Totsuka
