= Super-Kamiokande =

Japanese neutrino observatory

Coordinates: 36°25′32.6″N 137°18′37.1″E

Super-Kamiokande (Japanese: スーパーカミオカンデ, Hepburn: Sūpā Kamiokande; abbreviation of Super-Kamioka Neutrino Detection Experiment, also abbreviated to Super-K or SK) is a neutrino observatory located under Mount Ikeno near the city of Hida, Gifu Prefecture, Japan. It is operated by the Institute for Cosmic Ray Research of University of Tokyo, with the help of an international team. It is located 1,000 m (3,300 ft) underground in the Mozumi Mine in Hida's Kamioka area. The observatory was designed to detect high-energy neutrinos, to search for proton decay, study solar and atmospheric neutrinos, and keep watch for supernovae in the Milky Way galaxy.

== Description ==
Super-K is located 1,000 m (3,300 ft) underground in the Mozumi Mine in Hida's Kamioka area. It consists of a cylindrical stainless steel tank, measuring 39.3 m (129 ft) in diameter and 41.4 m (136 ft) in height, and contains 50,220 tonnes of ultrapure water. The tank volume is divided by a stainless steel superstructure into an inner detector (ID) region, which is 36.2 m (119 ft) in height and 33.8 m (111 ft) in diameter, and outer detector (OD) which consists of the remaining tank volume. Mounted on the superstructure are 11,146 photomultiplier tubes (PMT) 50 cm (20 in) in diameter that face the ID and 1,885 20 cm (8 in) PMTs that face the OD. A Tyvek and blacksheet barrier attached to the superstructure optically separates the ID and OD.

A neutrino interaction with the electrons or nuclei of water can produce a charged particle that moves faster than the speed of light in water, which is slower than the speed of light in vacuum. This creates a cone of light known as Cherenkov radiation, which is the optical equivalent to a sonic boom. The Cherenkov light is projected as a ring on the wall of the detector and recorded by the PMTs. Using the timing and charge information recorded by each PMT, the interaction vertex, ring direction, and flavor of the incoming neutrino is determined. From the sharpness of the edge of the ring the type of particle can be inferred. The multiple scattering of electrons is large, so electromagnetic showers produce fuzzy rings. Highly relativistic muons, in contrast, travel almost straight through the detector and produce rings with sharp edges.

== History ==
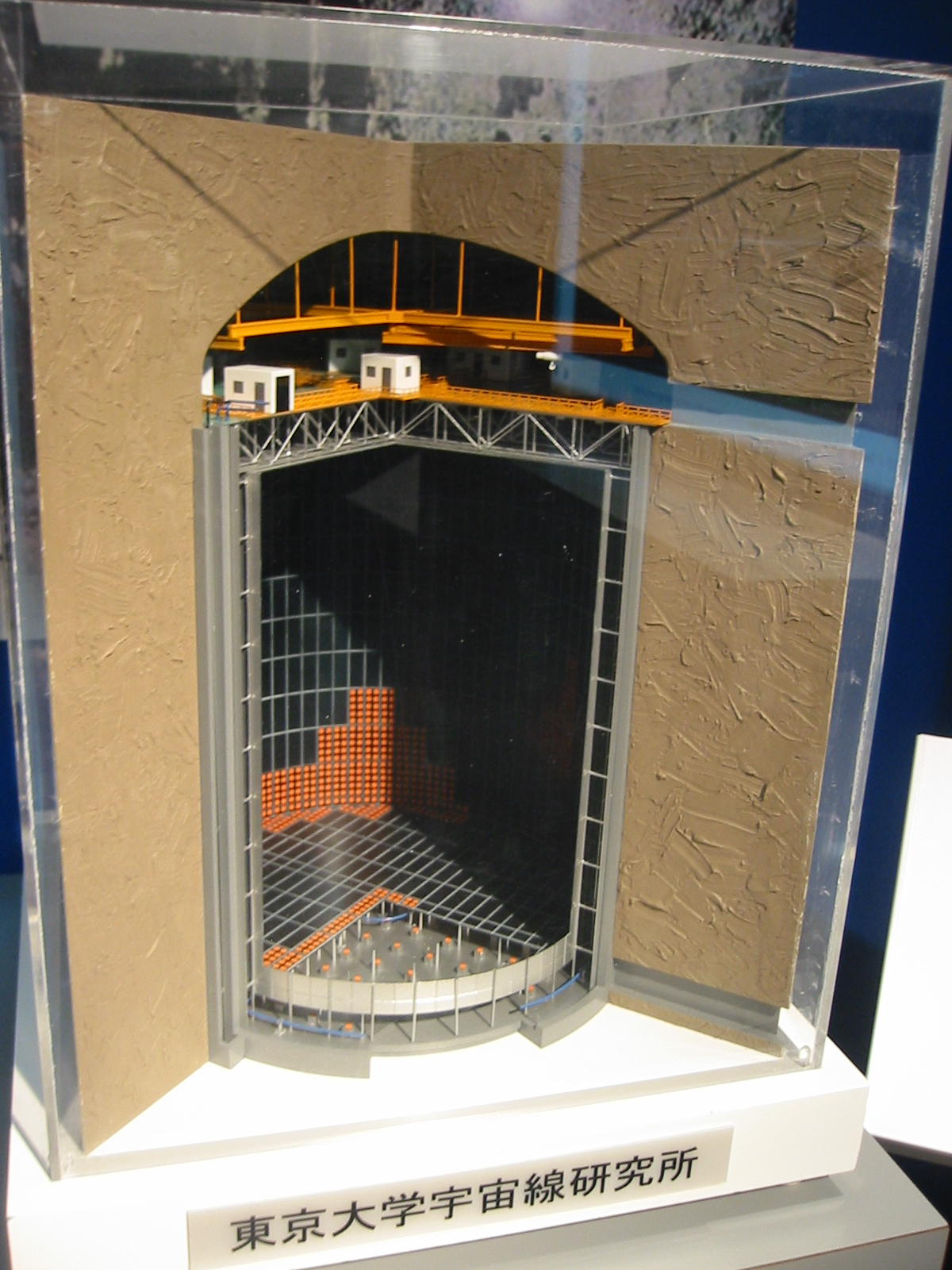
A model of KamiokaNDE

Construction of the predecessor of the present Kamioka Observatory, the Institute for Cosmic Ray Research, University of Tokyo began in 1982 and was completed in April 1983. The purpose of the observatory was to determine the existence of proton decay, one of the most fundamental questions of elementary particle physics.

The detector, named KamiokaNDE for Kamioka Nucleon Decay Experiment, was a tank 16.0 m (52 ft) in height and 15.6 m (51.2 ft) in width, containing 3,058 tonnes (3,400 US tons) of pure water and about 1,000 photomultiplier tubes (PMTs) attached to its inner surface. The detector was upgraded, starting in 1985, to allow it to observe solar neutrinos. As a result, the detector (KamiokaNDE-II) had become sensitive enough to detect ten neutrinos from SN 1987A, a supernova which was observed in the Large Magellanic Cloud in February 1987, and to observe solar neutrinos in 1988. The ability of the Kamiokande experiment to observe the direction of electrons produced in solar neutrino interactions allowed experimenters to directly demonstrate for the first time that the Sun was a source of neutrinos.

While making discoveries in neutrino astronomy and neutrino astrophysics, Kamiokande never detected a proton decay, the primary goal for its construction. The absence of any such observation pushed back the possible half-life of any potential proton decay far enough to eliminate some of the GUT models which allow for such a decay. Other models predict a longer half-life, with rarer decays.

To increase the chance of detecting such decays, a larger detector was needed. A higher sensitivity was also necessary to obtain a higher statistical confidence in other detections. This led to the design and construction of Super-Kamiokande, with fifteen times the volume of water and ten times as many PMTs as Kamiokande.

The Super-Kamiokande project was approved by the Japanese Ministry of Education, Science, Sports and Culture in 1991 for total funding of approximately $100 million. The American portion of the proposal, which was primarily to build the OD system, was approved by the United States Department of Energy in 1993 for $3 million. In addition, the United States has also contributed about 2000 20 cm PMTs recycled from the IMB experiment.

Super-Kamiokande started operation in 1996 and announced the first evidence of neutrino oscillation in 1998. This was the first experimental observation supporting the theory that the neutrino has non-zero mass, a possibility that theorists had speculated about for years. The 2015 Nobel Prize in Physics was awarded to Super-Kamiokande researcher Takaaki Kajita alongside Arthur McDonald at the Sudbury Neutrino Observatory for their work confirming neutrino oscillation.

On 12 November 2001, about 6,600 of the photomultiplier tubes imploded in a chain reaction, as the shock wave from the concussion of each imploding tube cracked its neighbours. The detector was partially restored from April to October 2002 by redistributing the photomultiplier tubes which did not implode, and by adding protective acrylic shells that are hoped will prevent another chain reaction from recurring (Super-Kamiokande-II).

In July 2005, preparations began to restore the detector to its original form by reinstalling about 6,000 PMTs. The reconstruction began in October 2005. The work was completed in July 2006, whereupon the detector was renamed Super-Kamiokande-III. This phase of the experiment collected data from October 2006 till August 2008. At that time, significant upgrades were made to the electronics. After the upgrade, the new phase of the experiment has been referred to as Super-Kamiokande-IV through May 2018. SK-IV collected data on various natural sources of neutrinos, as well as acted as the far detector for the Tokai-to-Kamioka (T2K) long baseline neutrino oscillation experiment.

After Phase IV, the detector underwent a full refurbishment during Autumn of 2018, including sealing the tank against water leaks, cleaning, improving piping, and replacing failed PMTs. On 29 January 2019 the detector resumed data acquisition.

In 2020, the detector was upgraded for the SuperKGd project (phase SK-VI) by adding a gadolinium salt to the ultrapure water in order to enable the detection of antineutrinos from supernova explosions. More gadolinium was added in 2022 and the observational phase following that was called SK-VII.

== Detector ==
The Super-Kamiokande (SK) is a Cherenkov detector used to study neutrinos from different sources including the Sun, supernovae, the atmosphere, and accelerators. It is also used to search for proton decay. The experiment began in April 1996 and was shut down for maintenance in July 2001, a period known as "SK-I". Since an accident occurred during maintenance, the experiment resumed in October 2002 with only half of its original number of ID-PMTs.

In order to prevent further accidents, all of the ID-PMTs were covered by fiber-reinforced plastic with acrylic front windows. This phase from October 2002 to another closure for an entire reconstruction in October 2005 is called "SK-II". In July 2006, the experiment resumed with the full number of PMTs and stopped in September 2008 for electronics upgrades. This period was known as "SK-III". The period after 2008 is known as "SK-IV". The phases and their main characteristics are summarised in table 1.

Table 1
Phase		SK-I	SK-II	SK-III	SK-IV
Period	Start	1996 Apr.	2002 Oct.	2006 Jul.	2008 Sep.
	End	2001 Jul.	2005 Oct.	2008 Sep.	2018 Jun.
Number of PMTs	ID	11146 (40%)	5182 (19%)	11129 (40%)	11129 (40%)
	OD	1885			
Anti-implosion container		No	Yes	Yes	Yes
OD segmentation		No	No	Yes	Yes
Front-end electronics		ATM (ID)			QBEE
		OD QTC (OD)			

=== SK-IV upgrade ===
In the previous phases, the ID-PMTs processed signals by custom electronics modules called analog timing modules (ATMs). Charge-to-analog converters (QAC) and time-to-analog converters (TAC) are contained in these modules that had dynamic range from 0 to 450 picocoulombs (pC) with 0.2 pC resolution for charge and from −300 to 1000 ns with 0.4 ns resolution for time. There were two pairs of QAC/TAC for each PMT input signal, this prevented dead time and allowed the readout of multiple sequential hits that may arise, e.g., from electrons that are decay products of stopping muons.

The SK system was upgraded in September 2008 in order to maintain the stability in the next decade and improve the throughput of the data acquisition systems, QTC-based electronics with Ethernet (QBEE). The QBEE provides high-speed signal processing by combining pipelined components. These components are a newly developed custom charge-to-time converter (QTC) in the form of an application-specific integrated circuit (ASIC), a multi-hit time-to-digital converter (TDC), and field-programmable gate array (FPGA). Each QTC input has three gain ranges "Small", "Medium", and "Large" – the resolutions for each are shown in Table.

Summary of QTC ranges for charge acquisition
Range	Measuring region	Resolution
Small	0–51 pC	0.1 pC/count (0.04 pe/count)
Medium	0–357 pC	0.7 pC/count (0.26 pe/count)
Large	0–2500 pC	4.9 pC/count (1.8 pe/count)

For each range, analog-to-digital conversion is conducted separately, but the only range used is that with the highest resolution that is not being saturated. The overall charge dynamic range of the QTC is 0.2–2500 pC, five times larger than the old . The charge and timing resolution of the QBEE at the single photoelectron level is 0.1 photoelectrons and 0.3 ns respectively, both are better than the intrinsic resolution of the 20-in. PMTs used in SK. The QBEE achieves good charge linearity over a wide dynamic range. The integrated charge linearity of the electronics is better than 1%. The thresholds of the discriminators in the QTC are set to −0.69 mV (equivalent to 0.25 photoelectron, which is the same as for SK-III). This threshold was chosen to replicate the behavior of the detector during its previous ATM-based phases.

=== SuperKGd ===
Gadolinium was introduced into the Super-Kamiokande water tank in 2020 in order to distinguish neutrinos from antineutrinos that arise from supernova explosions. This is known as the SK-Gd project (other names include SuperKGd, SUPERK-GD, and similar names). In the first phase of the project, 1.3 tons of a Gd salt (gadolinium sulfate octahydrate, Gd(SO_{4})_{3}⋅(H_{2}O)_{8}) were added to the ultrapure water in 2020, giving 0.02% (by mass) of the salt. This amount is about a tenth of the planned final target concentration.

Nuclear fusion in the Sun and other stars turns protons into neutrons with the emission of neutrinos. Beta decay in the Earth and in supernovas turns neutrons into protons with the emission of anti-neutrinos. The Super-Kamiokande detects electrons knocked off a water molecule producing a flash of blue Cherenkov light, and these are produced both by neutrinos and antineutrinos. A rarer instance is when an antineutrino interacts with a proton in water to produce a neutron and a positron.

Gadolinium has an affinity for neutrons and produces a bright flash of gamma rays when it absorbs one. Adding gadolinium to the Super-Kamiokande allows it to distinguish between neutrinos and antineutrinos. Antineutrinos produce a double flash of light about 30 microseconds apart, first when the neutrino hits a proton and second when gadolinium absorbs a neutron. The brightness of the first flash allows physicists to distinguish between low-energy antineutrinos from the Earth and high-energy antineutrinos from supernovas. In addition to observing neutrinos from distant supernovas, the Super-Kamiokande will be able to set off an alarm to inform astronomers around the world of the presence of a supernova in the Milky Way within one second of it occurring.

The biggest challenge was whether the detector's water could be continuously filtered to remove impurities without removing the gadolinium at the same time. A 200-ton prototype called EGADS with added gadolinium sulfate was installed in the Kamioka mine and operated for years. It finished operation in 2018 and showed that the new water purification system would remove impurities while keeping the gadolinium concentration stable. It also showed that gadolinium sulfate would not significantly impair the transparency of the otherwise ultrapure water, or cause corrosion or deposition on existing equipment or on the new valves that will later be installed in the Hyper-Kamiokande.

=== Water tank ===
The outer shell of the water tank is a cylindrical stainless-steel tank 39 m in diameter and 42 m in height. The tank is self-supporting, with concrete backfilled against the rough-hewn stone walls to counteract water pressure when the tank is filled. The capacity of the tank exceeds 50 kilotonnes of water.

=== PMTs and associate structure ===
The basic unit for the ID PMTs is a "supermodule", a frame that supports a 3×4 array of PMTs. Supermodule frames are 2.1 m in height, 2.8 m in width, and 0.55 m in thickness. These frames are connected to each other in both the vertical and horizontal directions. Then the whole support structure is connected to the bottom of the tank and to the top structure. In addition to serving as rigid structural elements, super module simplified the initial assembly of the ID.

Each supermodule was assembled on the tank floor and then hoisted into its final position. Thus, the ID is in effect tiled with super module. During installation, ID PMTs were pre-assembled in units of three for easy installation. Each supermodule has two OD PMTs attached on its back side. The support structure for the bottom PMTs is attached to the bottom of the stainless-steel tank by one vertical beam per supermodule frame. The support structure for the top of the tank is also used as the support structure for the top PMTs.

Cables from each group of three PMTs are bundled together. All cables run up the outer surface of the PMT support structure, i.e., on the OD PMT plane, pass through cable ports at the top of the tank, and are then routed into the electronics huts.

The thickness of the OD varies slightly, but is on average about 2.6 m on top and bottom, and 2.7 m on the barrel wall, giving the OD a total mass of 18 kilotons. OD PMTs were distributed with 302 on the top layer, 308 on the bottom, and 1275 on the barrel wall.

To protect against low-energy background radiation from radon decay products in the air, the roof of the cavity and the access tunnels were sealed with a coating called Mine guard. Mine guard is a spray-applied polyurethane membrane developed for use as a rock support system and radon gas barrier in the mining industry.

The average geomagnetic field is about 450 mG and is inclined by about 45° with respect to the horizon at the detector site. This presents a problem for the large and very sensitive PMTs which prefer a much lower ambient field. The strength and uniform direction of the geomagnetic field could systematically bias photoelectron trajectories and timing in the PMTs. To counteract this 26 sets of horizontal and vertical Helmholtz coils are arranged around the inner surfaces of the tank. With these in operation the average field in the detector is reduced to about 50 mG. The magnetic field at various PMT locations was measured before the tank was filled with water.

A standard fiducial volume of approximately 22.5 kilo tonnes is defined as the region inside a surface drawn 2.00 m from the ID wall to minimize the anomalous response caused by natural radioactivity in the surrounding rock.

== Monitoring system ==
=== Online monitoring system ===
An online monitor computer located in the control room reads data from the DAQ host computer via an FDDI link. It provides shift operators with a flexible tool for selecting event display features, makes online and recent-history histograms to monitor detector performance, and performs a variety of additional tasks needed to efficiently monitor status and diagnose detector and DAQ problems. Events in the data stream can be skimmed off and elementary analysis tools can be applied to check data quality during calibrations or after changes in hardware or online software.

=== Realtime supernova monitor ===
To detect and identify such bursts as efficiently and promptly as possible Super-Kamiokande is equipped with an online supernova monitor system. About 10,000 total events are expected in Super-Kamiokande for a supernova explosion at the center of the Milky Way Galaxy. Super-Kamiokande can measure a burst with no dead time, up to 30,000 events within the first second of a burst. Theoretical calculations of supernova explosions suggest that neutrinos are emitted over a total timescale of tens of seconds with about a half of them emitted during the first one or two seconds. The Super-K will search for event clusters in specified time windows of 0.5, 2, and 10 s.

Data are transmitted to realtime SN-watch analysis process every 2 minutes and analysis is completed typically in 1 minute. When supernova (SN) event candidates are found, ${R_\text{mean}}$ is calculated if the event multiplicity is larger than 16, where ${R_\text{mean}}$ is defined as the average spatial distance between events, i.e.

$${R_\text{mean}} =\frac {\sum_{i=1}^{{N_\text{multi}}-1} \sum_{j=i+1}^{{N_\text{multi}}} |{r_\text{i}}-{r_\text{j}}|} {{N_\text{multi}} {C_\text{2}}}$$

Neutrinos from supernovae interact with free protons, producing positrons which are distributed so uniformly in the detector that ${R_\text{mean}}$ for SN events should be significantly larger than for ordinary spatial clusters of events. In the Super-Kamiokande detector, ${R_\text{mean}}$ for uniformly distributed Monte Carlo events shows that no tail exists below ${R_\text{mean}}$⩽1000 cm. For the "alarm" class of burst, the events are required to have ${R_\text{mean}}$⩾900 cm for 25⩽${N_\text{multi}}$⩽40 or ${R_\text{mean}}$⩾750 cm for ${N_\text{multi}}$>40. These thresholds were determined by extrapolation from SN1987A data.

The system will run special processes to check for spallation muons when burst candidates meeting "alarm" criteria and make a primary decision for further process. If the burst candidate passes these checks, the data will be reanalyzed using an offline process and a final decision will be made within a few hours. During the Super-Kamiokande I running, this never occurred. One of the important capabilities for [Super-Kamiokande] is to reconstruct the direction to supernova. By neutrino–electron scattering, $\nu_\text{x} + e^- \to \nu_\text{x} + e^-$, a total of 100–150 events are expected in case of a supernova at the center of the Milky Way Galaxy. The direction to supernova can be measured with angular resolution

$$\delta \theta \sim {30^\circ \over \sqrt{N}}$$

where N is the number of events produced by the ν–e scattering. The angular resolution, therefore, can be as good as δθ~3° for a supernova at the center of the Milky Way Galaxy. In this case, not only time profile and the energy spectrum of a neutrino burst, but also the information on the direction of the supernova can be provided.

=== Slow control monitor and offline process monitor ===
There is a process called the "slow control" monitor, as part of the online monitoring system, that watches the status of the HV systems, the temperatures of electronics crates and the status of the compensating coils used to cancel the geomagnetic field. When any deviation from norms is detected, it will alert physicists to prompt to investigate, take appropriate action, or notify experts.

To monitor and control the offline processes that analyze and transfer data, a sophisticated set of software was developed. This monitor allows non-expert shift physicists to identify and repair common problems to minimize downtime, and the software package was a significant contribution to the smooth operation of the experiment and its overall high lifetime efficiency for data taking.

== Research ==
=== Solar neutrino ===
The energy of the Sun comes from the nuclear fusion of four protons in its core to yield a helium atom and two electron neutrinos. The neutrinos emitted from this reaction are called solar neutrinos. Photons resulting from nuclear fusion in the center of the Sun take millions of years to reach the surface; on the other hand, solar neutrinos arrive at Earth in about eight minutes due to their lack of interactions with matter. Consequently, solar neutrinos make it possible to observe the inner Sun without delay.

In 1999 the Super-Kamiokande detected strong evidence of neutrino oscillation that successfully explained the solar neutrino problem. The Sun and roughly 80% of visible stars produce their energy via the conversion of hydrogen to helium:

$4 \text{p} \to {}^4 \text{He} + 2 \text{e}^{+} + 2 \nu_\text{e} + 26.73 \text{ MeV}$.

The electron neutrinos shown in the reaction above arise primarily through the p-p chain in lower masses, and for cooler stars, through the CNO cycle of heavier masses.

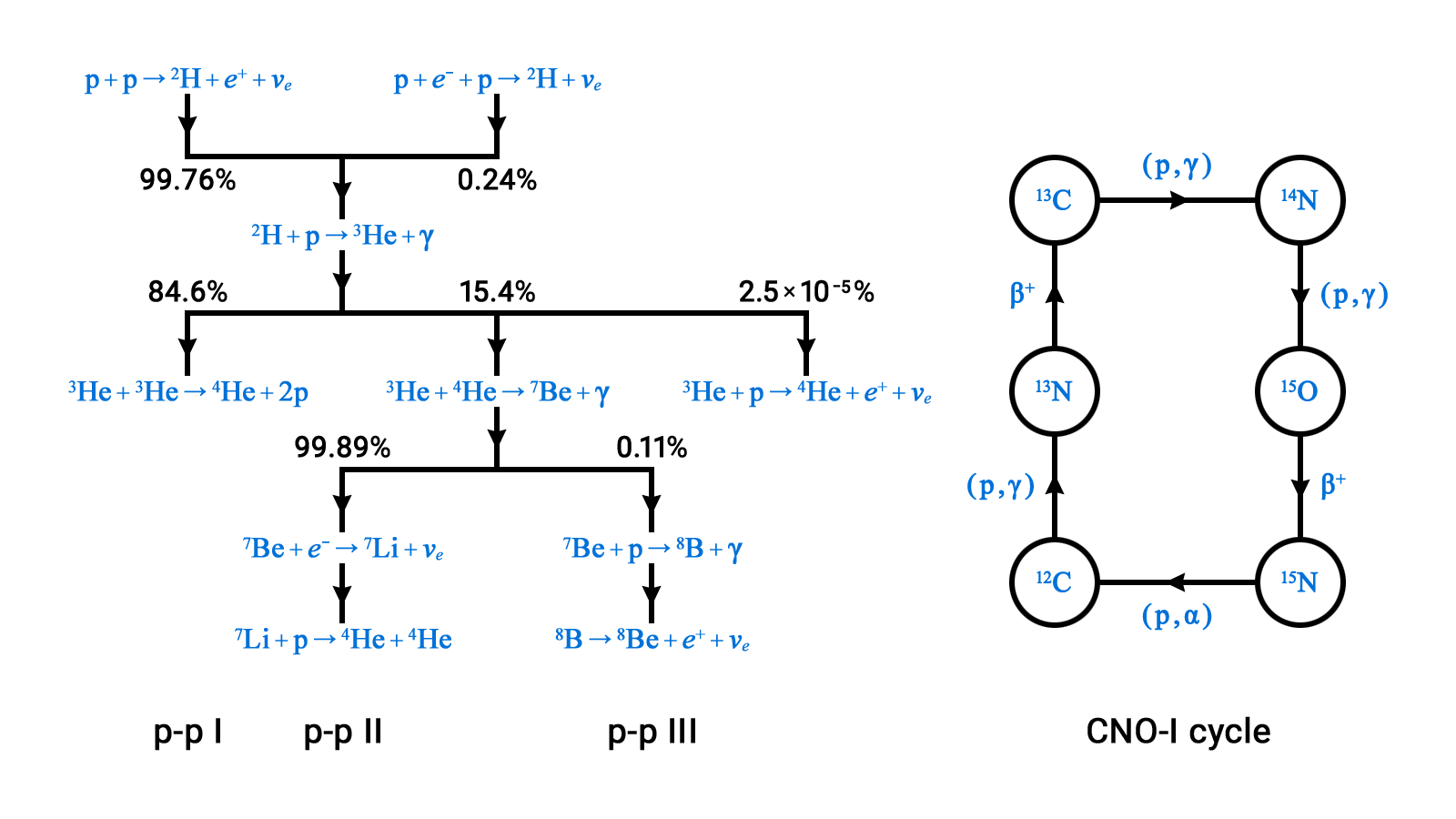
The left frame shows the three principal cycles comprising the p-p chain (p-p I, p-p II, and p-p III) and the neutrino sources associated with these cycles. The right frame shows the CNO-I cycle.

In the early 1990s, particularly with the uncertainties that accompanied the initial results from Kamioka II and the Ga experiments, no individual experiment required a non-astrophysical solution of the solar neutrino problem. But in aggregate, the Cl, Kamioka II, and Ga experiments indicated a pattern of neutrino fluxes that was not compatible with any adjustment of the Standard Solar Model (SSM). This in turn helped motivate a new generation of spectacularly capable active detectors. These experiments are Super-Kamiokande, the Sudbury Neutrino Observatory (SNO), and Borexino. For example, Super-Kamiokande is able to detect the elastic scattering event $\nu_x + \text{e}^{-} \to \nu_x + \text{e}^{-}$ which, due to the charged-current contribution to $\nu_\text{e}$ scattering, has a relative sensitivity to electron neutrinos and heavy-flavor neutrinos of approximately 7:1. Since the direction of the recoil electron is constrained to be predominantly forward, the resulting direction of the neutrinos is kept in the direction of the recoil electrons. Here, $\cos \theta_\text{Sun}$ is provided, where $\theta_\text{Sun}$ is the angle between the direction of the recoil electrons and the Sun's position. This shows that the ${}^8\text{B}$ solar neutrino flux is $2.40 \pm 0.03(\text{stat}) {}_{-0.07}^{+0.08}(\text{sys}) \times 10^6$ /cm^{2}-s. Comparing these data to the SSM, the ratio is $0.465 \pm 0.005(\text{stat}) {}_{-0.013}^{+0.015}(\text{sys})$. This result clearly indicates the deficit of solar neutrinos.

=== Atmospheric neutrino ===
Atmospheric neutrinos are secondary cosmic rays produced by the decay of particles resulting from interactions of primary cosmic rays (mostly protons) with Earth atmosphere. The observed atmospheric neutrino events fall into four categories. Fully contained (FC) events have all their tracks in the inner detector, while partially contained (PC) events have escaping tracks from the inner detector. Upward through-going muons (UTM) are produced in the rock beneath the detector and go through the inner detector. Upward stopping muons (USM) are also produced in the rock beneath the detector, but stop in the inner detector.

The number of observed neutrinos is predicted uniformly regardless of the zenith angle. However, Super-Kamiokande found that the number of upward-going muon neutrinos (generated on the other side of the Earth) is half of the number of downward-going muon neutrinos in 1998. This can be explained by the neutrinos changing or oscillating into some other neutrinos that are not detected. This is called neutrino oscillation; this discovery indicates the finite mass of neutrinos and suggests an extension of the Standard Model. Neutrinos oscillate in three flavors, and all neutrinos have their rest mass. Later analysis in 2004 suggested a sinusoidal dependence of the event rate as a function of "Length/Energy", which confirmed the neutrino oscillations.

=== K2K Experiment ===
The K2K experiment was a neutrino experiment from June 1999 to November 2004. This experiment was designed to verify oscillations observed by Super-Kamiokande through muon neutrinos produced by interactions of protons accelerated at the KEK laboratory on a target. It provided the first positive measurement of neutrino oscillations in conditions where the neutrino flux could be measured before oscillations by a close detector. The Super-Kamiokande detector plays an important role in the experiment as the far detector. A second-generation experiment,T2K experiment, was designed as a follow-up of the K2K experiment.

=== T2K Experiment ===
The T2K (Tokai to Kamioka) experiment is a wide international collaboration with the goal of measuring all the unknown parameters of neutrino oscillations. T2K has made a search for oscillations from muon neutrinos to electron neutrinos, and announced the first experimental indications for them in June 2011. Super-Kamiokande is the "far detector".

=== Proton decay and neutron-antineutron oscillations ===
The proton is assumed to be absolutely stable in the Standard Model. However, the Grand Unified Theories (GUTs) predict that protons can decay into lighter energetic charged particles such as electrons, muons, pions, or others which can be observed. Super-Kamiokande published the most stringent limits for most of the proton decay channels:

- 2.4×10^{34} years for decay to a positron and a neutral pion (p → e⁺ + π⁰),
- 1.6×10^{34} years for decay to an antimuon and a neutral pion (p → μ⁺ + π⁰),
- 0.59×10^{34} years for decay to an muon antineutrino and a positive kaon (p → ν̄K^{+}).

Furthermore, Super-Kamiokande published the most stringent limit on neutron-antineutron oscillations, establishing a limit to the neutron-antineutron nuclear lifetime of $T_{n\bar{n}} \geq 3.6 \cdot 10^{32}$ yr at 90% confidence level, corresponding to a limit on the neutron-antineutron oscillation time of $\textstyle \tau_{n\bar n} \geq 4.7 \cdot 10^8$ s.

== Purification ==
=== Water purification system ===
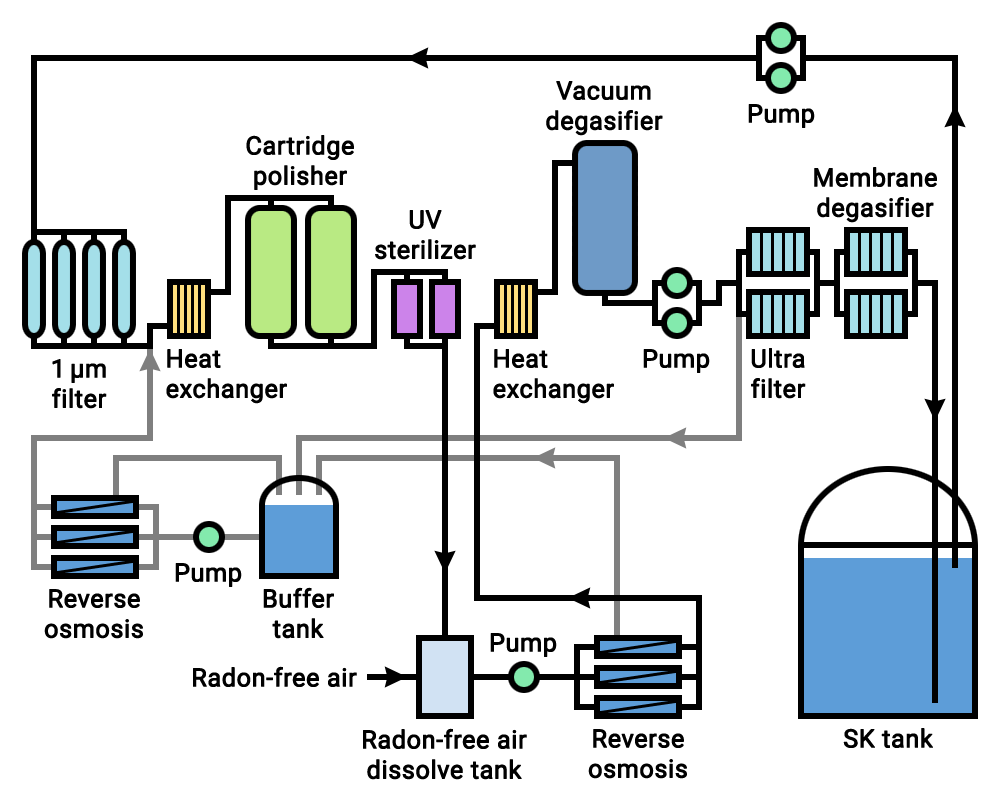
Water purification system schematic

Since 2002, the 50 kilotons of pure water have been continually reprocessed at a rate of about 30 tons per hour in a closed system. Now, raw mine water is recycled through the first step (particle filters and RO) for some time before other processes, which involve expensive expendables, are imposed. Initially, water from the Super-Kamiokande tank is passed through nominal 1 μm mesh filters to remove dust and particles, which reduce the transparency of the water for Cherenkov photons and provide a possible radon source inside the Super-Kamiokande detector.

A heat exchanger is used to cool down the water in order to reduce the PMT dark noise level as well as suppress the growth of bacteria. Surviving bacteria are killed by a UV sterilizer stage. A cartridge polisher (CP) eliminates heavy ions, which also reduce water transparency and include radioactive species. The CP module increases the typical resistivity of recirculating water from 11 MΩ cm to 18.24 MΩ cm, approaching the chemical limit.

Originally, an ion-exchanger (IE) was included in the system, but it was removed when IE resin was found to be a significant radon source. The reverse osmosis (RO) step that removes additional particulates, and the introduction of Rn-reduced air into the water that increases radon removal efficiency in the vacuum degasifier (VD) stage which follows, were installed in 1999. After that, a VD removes dissolved gases in the water.

These dissolved gases in water are a serious background event source for solar neutrinos in the MeV energy range and the dissolved oxygen encourages the growth of bacteria. The removal efficiency is about 96%. Then, the ultra filter (UF) is introduced to remove particles whose minimum size corresponds to a molecular weight of approximately 10,000 (or about 10 nm diameter) thanks to hollow fiber membrane filters. Finally, a membrane degasifier (MD) removes radon dissolved in water, and the measured removal efficiency for radon is about 83%. The concentration of radon gases is measured by real-time detectors. In June 2001, typical radon concentrations in water coming into the purification system from the Super-Kamiokande tank were less than 2 mBq m^{−3}, and in water output by the system, 0.4±0.2 mBq m^{−3}.

=== Air purification system ===
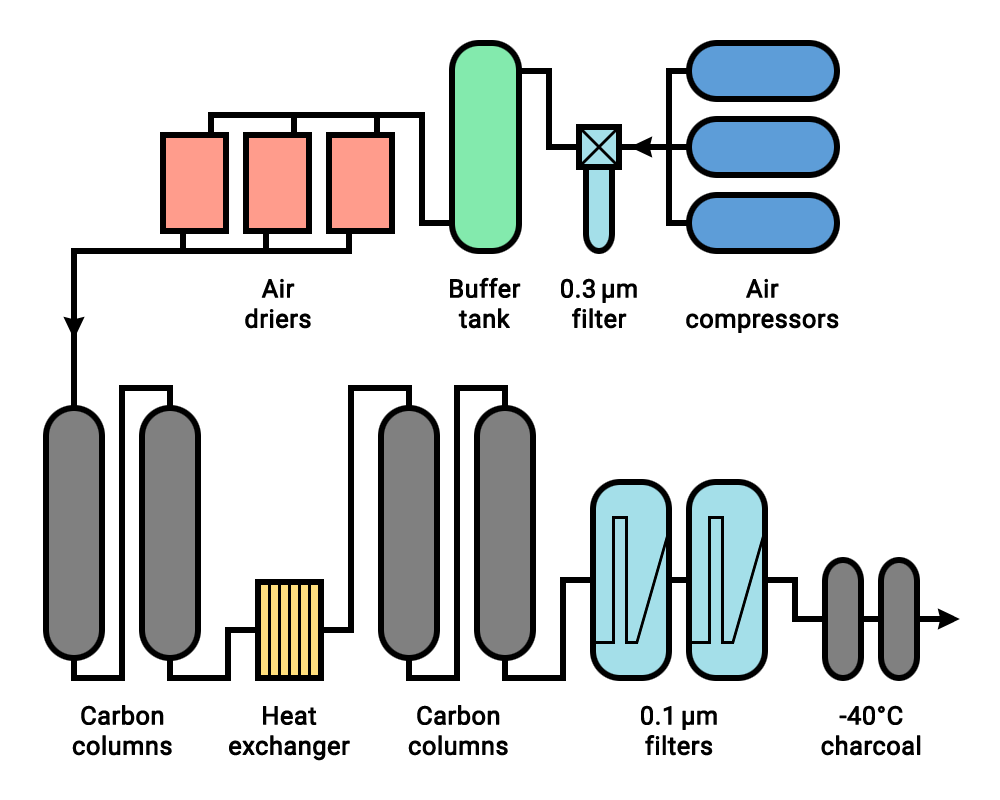
Air purification system schematic

Purified air is supplied in the gap between the water surface and the top of the Super-Kamiokande tank. The air purification system contains three compressors, a buffer tank, dryers, filters, and activated charcoal filters. A total of 8 m^{3} of activated charcoal is used. The last 50 L of charcoal is cooled to −40 °C to increase removal efficiency for radon. Typical flow rates, dew point, and residual radon concentration are 18 m^{3}/h, −65 °C (@+1 kg/cm^{2}), and a few mBq m^{−3}, respectively. Typical radon concentration in the dome air is measured to be 40 Bq m^{−3}.

Radon levels in the mine tunnel air, near the tank cavity dome, typically reach 2000–3000 Bq m^{−3} during the warm season, from May until October, while from November to April the radon level is approximately 100–300 Bq m^{−3}. This variation is due to the chimney effect in the ventilation pattern of the mine tunnel system; in cold seasons, fresh air flows into the Atotsu tunnel entrance that is a relatively short path through exposed rock before reaching the experimental area, while in the summer, air flows out the tunnel, drawing radon-rich air from deep within the mine past the experimental area.

In order to keep radon levels in the dome area and water purification system below 100 Bq m^{−3}, fresh air is continually pumped at approximately 10 m^{3}/min from outside the mine which generates a slight over-pressure in the Super-Kamiokande experimental area to minimize the entry of ambient mine air. A "Radon Hut" (Rn Hut) was constructed near the Atotsu tunnel entrance to house equipment for the dome air system: a 40 hp air pump with 10 m^{3} min^{−1} /15 PSI pump capacity, air dehumidifier, carbon filter tanks, and control electronics. In autumn 1997, an extended intake air pipe was installed at a location approximately 25 m above the Atotsu tunnel entrance. This low level satisfies that goals of air quality so that carbon filter regeneration operations would no longer be required.

== Data processing ==
Offline data processing is produced both in Kamioka and in the United States.

=== In Kamioka ===
The offline data processing system is located in Kenkyuto and is connected to Super-Kamiokande detector with 4 km FDDI optical fiber link. Data flow from online system is 450 kbytes s^{−1} on average, corresponding to 40 Gbytes day^{−1} or 14 Tbytes yr^{−1}. Magnetic tapes are used in offline system to store data and most of the analysis is accomplished here. The offline processing system is designed platform-independent because different computer architectures are used for data analysis. Because of this, the data structures are based on ZEBRA bank system developed in CERN as well as the ZEBRA exchange system.

Event data from Super-Kamiokande online DAQ system basically contains a list of number of hit PMT, TDC, and ADC counts, GPS time-stamps, and other housekeeping data. For solar neutrino analysis, lowering the energy threshold is a constant goal, so it is a continual effort to improve the efficiency of reduction algorithms; however, changes in calibrations or reduction methods require reprocessing of earlier data. Typically, 10 Tbytes of raw data is processed every month so that a large amount of CPU power and high-speed I/O access to the raw data. Extensive Monte Carlo simulation processing is also necessary.

Offline system was designed to meet demand of all these: tape storage of a large database (14 Tbytes yr^{−1}), stable semi-realtime processing, nearly continuous re-processing and Monte Carlo simulation. The computer system consists of three major sub-systems: the data server, the CPU farm, and the network at the end of Run I.

=== In the United States ===
A system dedicated to offsite offline data processing was set up at the Stony Brook University in Stony Brook, New York, to process raw data sent from Kamioka. Most of the reformatted raw data are copied from system facility in Kamioka. At Stony Brook, a system was set up for analysis and further processing. At Stony Brook the raw data were processed with a multi-tape DLT drive. The first-stage data reduction processes were done for the high-energy analysis and for the low-energy analysis.

The data reduction for the high-energy analysis was mainly for atmospheric neutrino events and proton decay search while the low-energy analysis was mainly for the solar neutrino events. The reduced data for the high-energy analysis was further filtered by other reduction processes and the resulting data were stored on disks. The reduced data for the low-energy were stored on DLT tapes and sent to University of California, Irvine, for further processing.

This offset analysis system continued for three years until their analysis chains were proved to produce equivalent results. Thus, in order to limit manpower, collaborations were concentrated to a single combined analysis

== Results ==
In 1998, Super-K found first strong evidence of neutrino oscillation from the observation of muon neutrinos changed into tau-neutrinos.

SK has set limits on proton lifetime and other rare decays and neutrino properties. SK set a lower bound on protons decaying to kaons of 5.9 × 10^{33} yr

In January 2023, from data collected during the 1996–2018 period, new limits were reported by Super-Kamiokande for sub-GeV dark matter excluding the dark matter–nucleon elastic scattering cross section between $10^{-33} cm^{2}$ and $10^{-27} cm^{2}$ with masses from $1\ MeV/c^2$ to $300\ MeV/c^2$.

== In popular culture ==
Super-Kamiokande is the subject of Andreas Gursky's 2007 photograph Kamiokande and was featured in an episode of Cosmos: A Spacetime Odyssey.

In September 2018, the detector was drained for maintenance, affording a team of Australian Broadcasting Corporation reporters the opportunity to obtain 4K resolution video from within the detection tank.

The design of the room housing a super computer in the film Eagle Eye resembles the Super-Kamiokande detection tank.

== Awards ==
The following is a selection of awards from leading international organizations.

1989: Members of the IMB and Kamioka Experiment teams were awarded the Bruno Rossi prize of the High Energy Astrophysics Division of the American Astronomical Society "for the dramatic and mutually confirming detections by these two experiments of a burst of neutrinos from SN1987A."

2000: Masatoshi Koshiba was awarded the Wolf Prize in Physics, jointly with Raymond Davis Jr. "for their pioneering observations of astronomical phenomena by detection of neutrinos, thus creating the emerging field of neutrino astronomy."

2002: Masatoshi Koshiba was awarded the Nobel Prize in Physics jointly with Raymond Davis Jr. "for pioneering contributions to astrophysics, in particular for the detection of cosmic neutrinos"

2002: Masatoshi Koshiba, Takaaki Kajita, Yoji Totsuka were awarded the Panofsky Prize of the American Physical Society.

2010: Yoichiro Suzuki was awarded the Bruno Pontecorvo Prize of JINR in Dubna "for his contributions to the detection of atmospheric and solar neutrino oscillations in the Super Kamiokande collaboration".

2013: Yoichiro Suzuki was awarded the Cocconi Prize of the European Physical Society, jointly with Arthur B. McDonald "for their outstanding contributions to the solution of the solar neutrino puzzle by measuring the flux of all neutrino flavors from the Sun with the SNO and Super-Kamiokande experiments."

2015: Takaaki Kajita was awarded the Nobel Prize in Physics jointly with Arthur B. McDonald "for the discovery of neutrino oscillations, which shows that neutrinos have mass"

2016: Takaaki Kajita, Yoichiro Suzuki and the Super Kamiokande team were awarded the Breakthrough Prize in Fundamental Physics together with other neutrino research consortia "for the fundamental discovery and exploration of neutrino oscillations, revealing a new frontier beyond, and possibly far beyond, the standard model of particle physics."

== See also ==
- Masatoshi Koshiba
- Yoji Totsuka
- SNOLAB
