= Katsuhiko Sato (physicist) =

Japanese physicist (born 1945)

Katsuhiko Sato 佐藤 勝彦
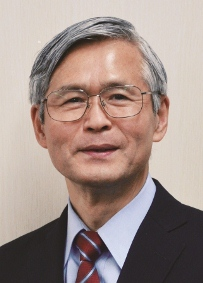
- Born: August 30, 1945 (age 81); Sakaide, Japan
- Education: Kyoto University
- Known for: Cosmic inflation theory Supernovae and Neutrinos; Gravitational-wave astronomy Pycnonuclear fusion
- Awards: Nishina Memorial Prize (1990); Japan Academy Prize (2010); Person of Cultural Merit (2014); Order of the Sacred Treasure (2018)
- Scientific career
- Workplaces: University of Tokyo
- Doctoral advisor: Chushiro Hayashi
- Doctoral students: Tomonori Totani

Katsuhiko Sato (佐藤 勝彦, Satō Katsuhiko; August 30, 1945) is a Japanese physicist and Special University Professor, emeritus, the University of Tokyo.

Professor Sato published a paper advocating cosmic inflation in 1981, but it was not widely recognized by Western academic circles.

== Life ==
Katsuhiko Sato was born in Sakaide, Kagawa Prefecture, Japan on August 30, 1945. He graduated from the Department of Physics, Faculty of Science, Kyoto University, and received a Doctor of Science degree.

Since he was a graduate student, Sato has been conducting research on supernovae, following the advice of his mentor, Chushiro Hayashi. Among other things he conducted research on the influence of neutrinos in supernovae.

Sato has served as a research assistant at Kyoto University, a visiting professor at the Nordic Institute for Theoretical Physics, an associate professor/professor at the University of Tokyo, the Chairman of 47th Committee of the International Astronomical Union, and the president of the Physical Society of Japan.

== Origin of the Inflation ==
Sato proposed inflationary cosmology in 1981, around the same time as Alan Guth. Sato was the first to submit a paper on this theory, Guth presented an inflation model similar to Sato's at a seminar at Stanford University in January 1980. Alexei Starobinsky also presented the idea of a similar model in 1979 and published a paper in 1980.

Alan Guth was the first to use the term "inflation". Sato originally used the term "exponential expansion model". Sato said:

"I originally called this model the 'exponential expansion model.' However, American astrophysicist Guth published a similar model six months later, cleverly naming it the 'Inflation model.' That's why it It's like this." It's now called inflation theory."

JAXA Space Information Center describes it as follows:

Katsuhiko Sato published his theory of inflation in 1981. Alan Harvey Goose also published his theory of inflation around the same time as Sato, but Sato published his paper earlier.

== Academic genealogy ==
Sato studied under the world-renowned astronomer Chushiro Hayashi, who was a student of Hideki Yukawa, Japan's first Nobel Prize winner.

On October 8, 2002, Sato was the first person to receive a call from the Royal Swedish Academy of Sciences to the Koshiba Laboratory informing Masatoshi Koshiba that he had won this year's Nobel Prize in Physics. Sato and Yoji Totsuka decided to attend Koshiba's press conference that evening together. Sato sat to the left of Koshiba at the press conference. In any case, Japan's leading group of astronomers maintained close contacts.

== Recognition ==
- 1989 - Inoue Prize for Science
- 1990 - Nishina Memorial Prize
- 2002 - Medal with Purple Ribbon
- 2010 - Japan Academy Prize
- 2014 - Person of Cultural Merit
- 2018 - Order of the Sacred Treasure

== Namesakes and popular culture ==
The asteroid 7965 Katsuhiko, discovered in 1996, was named after Professor Sato.

In the Japanese role-playing video game Shin Megami Tensei If..., a character "Sato" is named after Professor Sato.

== See also ==
- Alan Guth
- Masatoshi Koshiba
- Yoji Totsuka
