= Totani =

Totani (written: 戸谷) is a Japanese surname. Notable people with this surname include:

- Kimito Totani (戸谷 公人, born 1990), Japanese voice actor
- Kōji Totani (戸谷 公次, 1948–2006), Japanese voice actor and narrator
- Tomonori Totani (戸谷 友則, born 1971), Japanese astronomer

== See also ==
- South Australia v Totani
