= K2K experiment =

Japanese neutrino experiment

The K2K experiment (KEK to Kamioka) was a neutrino experiment that ran from June 1999 to November 2004. It used muon neutrinos from a well-controlled and well-understood beam to verify the oscillations previously observed by Super-Kamiokande using atmospheric neutrinos. This was the first positive measurement of neutrino oscillations in which both the source and detector were fully under experimenters' control. Previous experiments relied on neutrinos from the Sun or from cosmic sources. The experiment found oscillation parameters which were consistent with those measured by Super-Kamiokande.

== Experimental design ==
K2K is a neutrino experiment which directed a beam of muon neutrinos (ν_{μ}) from the 12 GeV proton synchrotron at the KEK, located in Tsukuba, Ibaraki, to the Kamioka Observatory, located in Kamioka, Gifu, about 250 km away. The muon neutrinos travelled through Earth, which allowed them to oscillate (change) into other flavours of neutrinos, namely into electron neutrinos (ν_{e}) and tau neutrinos (ν_{τ}). K2K however, focused only on ν_{μ} → ν_{τ} oscillations.

The proton beam from the synchrotron was directed onto an aluminium target, and the resulting collisions produced a copious amount of pions. These pions were then focused into a 200 m decay pipe, where they would decay into muons and muon neutrinos. The muons were stopped at the end of the pipe, leaving a beam of muon neutrinos. The exact composition of the beam contained over 97% muon neutrinos, with the other 3% being made of electron neutrinos (ν_{e}), electron antineutrinos (ν̅_{e}) and muon antineutrinos (ν̅_{μ}).

After they exited the pipe, the neutrinos went through a 1-kiloton water Cherenkov neutrino detector ("near detector") located at about 300 m from the aluminium target to determine the neutrino beam characteristics. This 1-kiloton "near detector" was a scaled-down version of the 50-kiloton Super-Kamiokande "far detector" located at the Kamioka Observatory, which allowed scientists to eliminate certain systematic uncertainties that would be present if two different detector types were used. This dual-detector configuration allowed the comparison of the neutrino beam at the near detector with the neutrino beam at the far detector to determine if neutrinos had oscillated or not.

== Collaboration ==
The K2K collaboration consisted of roughly 130 physicists from 27 universities and research institutes from all over the world, listed below. The full list of scientists and their countries of origin is available on the K2K website.

- Boston University
- Chonnam National University
- CEA Saclay (DSM-DAPNIA)
- Dongshin University
- High Energy Accelerator Research Organization
- Hiroshima University
- Institute for Cosmic Ray Research
- Institute for Nuclear Research
- Kobe University
- Korea University
- Kyoto University
- Massachusetts Institute of Technology
- Niigata University
- Okayama University
- Sapienza University of Rome
- Seoul National University
- State University of New York at Stony Brook
- Tokyo University of Science
- Tohoku University
- Autonomous University of Barcelona/IFAE
- University of California, Irvine
- University of Geneva
- University of Hawaii
- University of Tokyo
- University of Valencia
- University of Warsaw
- University of Washington

== Results ==
The final K2K results found that at 99.9985% confidence (4.3 σ) there had been a disappearance of muon neutrinos. Fitting the data under the oscillation hypothesis, the best fit for the square of the mass difference between muon neutrinos and tau neutrinos was Δm^{2} = 2.8×10^{−3} eV^{2}. This result is in good agreement with the previous Super-Kamiokande result, and the later MINOS result.

== See also ==
- T2K experiment – the successor of the K2K experiment
