= 2002 Nobel Prizes =

The 2002 Nobel Prizes were awarded by the Nobel Foundation, based in Sweden. Six categories were awarded: Physics, Chemistry, Physiology or Medicine, Literature, Peace, and Economic Sciences.

Nobel Week took place from December 6 to 12, including programming such as lectures, dialogues, and discussions. The award ceremony and banquet for the Peace Prize were scheduled in Oslo on December 10, while the award ceremony and banquet for all other categories were scheduled for the same day in Stockholm.

== Prizes ==
=== Physics ===
Awardee(s)
Raymond Davis Jr. (1914–2006)	American	"for pioneering contributions to astrophysics, in particular for the detection of cosmic neutrinos"
Masatoshi Koshiba (1926–2020)	Japanese	"for pioneering contributions to astrophysics, in particular for the detection of cosmic neutrinos"
Riccardo Giacconi (1931–2018)	Italian American	"for pioneering contributions to astrophysics, which have led to the discovery of cosmic X-ray sources"

=== Chemistry ===
Awardee(s)
John B. Fenn	John B. Fenn (1917–2010)	American	"for the development of methods for identification and structure analyses of biological macromolecules [...] for their development of soft desorption ionisation methods for mass spectrometric analyses of biological macromolecules"
	Koichi Tanaka (b. 1959)	Japanese	"for the development of methods for identification and structure analyses of biological macromolecules [...] for their development of soft desorption ionisation methods for mass spectrometric analyses of biological macromolecules"
Kurt Wüthrich	Kurt Wüthrich (b. 1938)	Swiss	"for the development of methods for identification and structure analyses of biological macromolecules [...] for his development of nuclear magnetic resonance spectroscopy for determining the three-dimensional structure of biological macromolecules in solution"

=== Physiology or Medicine ===
Awardee(s)
Sydney Brenner (1927–2019)	South Africa	"for their discoveries concerning 'genetic regulation of organ development and programmed cell death'"
H. Robert Horvitz (b. 1947)	United States	"for their discoveries concerning 'genetic regulation of organ development and programmed cell death'"
Sir John E. Sulston (1942–2018)	United Kingdom	"for their discoveries concerning 'genetic regulation of organ development and programmed cell death'"

=== Literature ===
Awardee(s)		
Imre Kertész (1929–2016)	Hungary	"for writing that upholds the fragile experience of the individual against the barbaric arbitrariness of history"

=== Peace ===
Awardee(s)
Jimmy Carter (1924–2024)	United States	"for his decades of untiring effort to find peaceful solutions to international conflicts, to advance democracy and human rights, and to promote economic and social development."

=== Economic Sciences ===
Awardee(s)
Daniel Kahneman (1934–2024)	Israel United States	"for having integrated insights from psychological research into economic science, especially concerning human judgment and decision-making under uncertainty"
Vernon L. Smith (b. 1927)	United States	"for having established laboratory experiments as a tool in empirical economic analysis, especially in the study of alternative market mechanisms"

== Controversies ==
=== Peace ===
Carter's awarding for the Peace Prize occurred shortly before George W. Bush authorization of military force in Iraq. When asked, Nobel Prize committee head Gunnar Berge stated that "With the position Carter has taken on this, it can and must also be seen as criticism of the line the current US administration has taken on Iraq." Carter declined to comment on the remark in interviews, saying that he preferred to focus on the work of the Carter Center.
