= Totsuka (surname) =

Totsuka (written: 戸塚) is a Japanese surname. Notable people with the surname include:

- Tetsuya Totsuka (戸塚 哲也, born 1961), Japanese footballer and manager
- Yoji Totsuka (戸塚 洋二, 1942–2008), Japanese physicist
- Yūto Totsuka (戸塚 優斗, born 2001), Japanese snowboarder
