= Masatoshi Koshiba =

Japanese physicist (1926–2020)

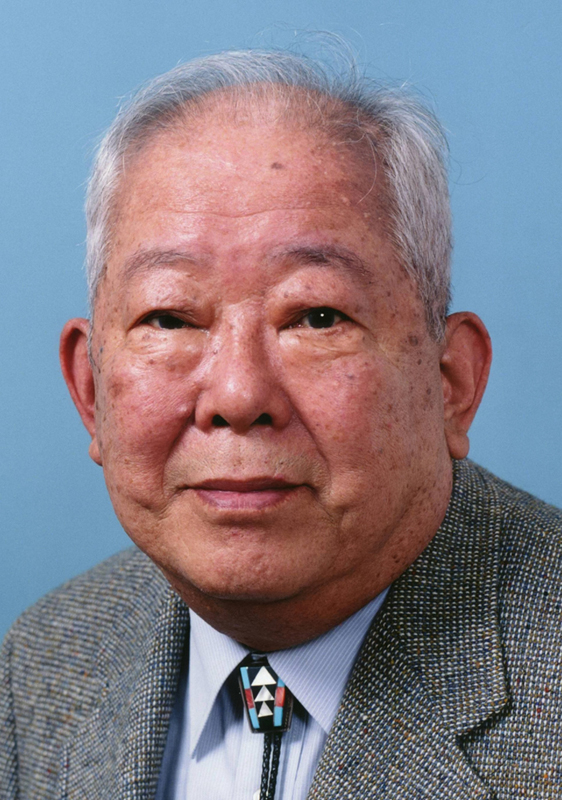
- Photograph of Koshiba published in 2002
- Born: September 19, 1926; Toyohashi, Aichi, Japan
- Died: November 12, 2020 (aged 94); Tokyo, Japan
- Education: University of Tokyo; University of Rochester
- Known for: Astrophysics, neutrinos
- Awards: Humboldt Prize (1997); Wolf Prize in Physics (2000); Nobel Prize in Physics (2002)
- Scientific career
- Fields: Physics
- Workplaces: University of Chicago; George Washington University; University of Tokyo; Tokai University
- Thesis: High energy electron-proton cascade in cosmic radiation (1955)
- Doctoral advisor: Morton F. Kaplon
- Other academic advisors: Shin'ichirō Tomonaga; Takahiko Yamanouchi
- Doctoral students: Yoji Totsuka; Atsuto Suzuki
- Other notable students: Takaaki Kajita

Masatoshi Koshiba (小柴 昌俊, Koshiba Masatoshi; 19 September 1926 – 12 November 2020) was a Japanese physicist and one of the founders of neutrino astronomy. His work with the neutrino detectors Kamiokande and Super-Kamiokande was instrumental in detecting solar neutrinos, providing experimental evidence for the solar neutrino problem.

Koshiba won the Nobel Prize in Physics in 2002, jointly with Raymond Davis Jr., "for pioneering contributions to astrophysics, in particular for the detection of cosmic neutrinos". Koshiba was the first Japanese Nobel laureate to hold two doctoral degrees. In addition, he was the second Japanese recipient of both the Nobel Prize and the Wolf Prize. His mentor, Sin-Itiro Tomonaga, and his student, Takaaki Kajita, were also Nobel Prize winners in Physics.

He was a senior counselor at the International Center for Elementary Particle Physics (ICEPP) and professor at the University of Tokyo.

== Early life ==
Koshiba was born in Toyohashi in central Japan on September 19, 1926, to Toshio and Hayako Koshiba. His father was a military officer. His mother died when he was three, leading to his father marrying his wife's elder sister. He grew up in Yokosuka, and completed his high school in Tokyo. It is mentioned that his initial interest was in studying German literature, but, ended up studying physics, spurred by a teacher's denigrating comments.

He graduated from the University of Tokyo in 1951 and received a PhD in physics from the University of Rochester, New York, in 1955.

== Career and research ==
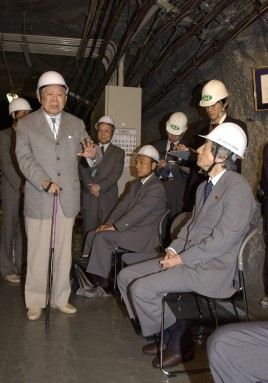
With Jun'ichirō Koizumi, at Kamioka Observatory, Institute for Cosmic Ray Research, University of Tokyo, August 2003

Koshiba started his career as a research associate at the Department of Physics, University of Chicago from July 1955 to February 1958, and was an associate professor at Institute of Nuclear Study, University of Tokyo from March 1958 to October 1963. While on leave from November 1959 to August 1962 he served as the acting director, Laboratory of High Energy Physics and Cosmic Radiation, Department of Physics, University of Chicago.

At the University of Tokyo he became associate professor in March 1963 and then professor in March 1970 in the Department of Physics, Faculty of Science, and emeritus professor there in 1987. From 1987 to 1997, Koshiba taught at Tokai University.

In 2002, he jointly won the Nobel Prize in Physics for "pioneering contributions to astrophysics, in particular for the detection of cosmic neutrinos". (The other shares of that year's Prize were awarded to Raymond Davis Jr. and Riccardo Giacconi of the U.S.A.)

Koshiba's initial research was in cosmic rays. In 1969, he shifted into electron-positron collider physics, and was involved with the JADE detector in Germany, which helped confirm the Standard Model. Along with Masayuki Nakahata and Atsuto Suzuki, Koshiba designed the Kamiokande experiment to detect proton decay, a prediction of grand unified theories. No proton decay was detected, but Koshiba realized the detector could be made to detect neutrinos, and adapted the project accordingly, following the pioneering U.S. work of Davis.

In the early 1970s, Koshiba collaborated with Gersh Budker (1918–1977), the particle-accelerator electron cooling pioneer in the Soviet Union. This collaboration was cut short for unknown reasons but Budker died of heart attack a few years later.

Through this experiment, he (and Davis in the U.S.) were able to confirm the prediction that neutrinos are generated during the nuclear fusion reaction in the sun. However, these experiments detected fewer neutrinos than had been expected. This deficit was called the solar neutrino problem. The deficit would be eventually explained by "neutrino oscillations", whose existence was confirmed by an enlarged version of Kamiokande, known as Super-Kamiokande, run under the direction of Koshiba's student Takaaki Kajita.

In 1987, the Kamiokande experimental detector detected neutrinos from the supernova explosion (designated SN 1987A) outside the Milky Way, the Large Magellanic Cloud. His research was pioneering in the establishment of neutrino astronomy as a field of study.

In 1996, with the promising results from Kamiokande, the team operationalized a larger and more sensitive detector called Super-Kamiokande. With this detector, scientists were able to demonstrate strong evidence to prove that neutrinos changed from one type to another of three types during flight. This demonstration resolved the solar neutrino problem with the reasoning being that the early detectors could detect one type of neutrino rather than all three types.

In 2003, the Koshiba Prize was created in his honor.

Koshiba was a member of the Board of Sponsors of the Bulletin of the Atomic Scientists, and also a foreign fellow of Bangladesh Academy of Sciences. He was a founding member of the Edogawa NICHE Prize Steering committee.

== Academic Lineage ==
Koshiba’s mentor, Sin-Itiro Tomonaga, also served as the matchmaker for Koshiba and his wife. Professor Toshi Koshiba (小柴 俊) of Kagawa University’s Faculty of Engineering is the son of Masatoshi Koshiba.

Koshiba once remarked, “Among the disciples who have inherited my work, two are worthy of receiving the Nobel Prize.” It is generally believed that he was referring to Yoji Totsuka and Takaaki Kajita. In 2015, Kajita was officially awarded the Nobel Prize and explicitly thanked both Koshiba and Totsuka in his Nobel Lecture for their pivotal contributions.

On July 10, 2008, Yoji Totsuka died due to colon cancer. In the September 2008 issue of Bungeishunjū, Koshiba wrote a memorial article titled “The Regret of Reading a Disciple’s Eulogy”, in which he lamented, “If Totsuka had lived just 18 more months, he would certainly have won the Nobel Prize.” To honor his late disciple, Koshiba established the “Shuji Orimoto Prize” and the “Yoji Totsuka Prize” in 2010, awarding individuals who have made outstanding contributions to accelerator and particle physics research, respectively.

== Personal life ==
While attending the former First Higher School (now the College of Arts and Sciences at the University of Tokyo), Masatoshi Koshiba performed very poorly academically. One day, he happened to overhear teachers in the school dormitory’s communal bath (as the school was fully residential at the time) discussing his grades, saying, “Koshiba’s grades are so bad that even if he makes it into the UTokyo, the best he could do would be to study Indian philosophy.” Deeply stung by this remark, Koshiba asked his roommate, Kozo Kuchitsu (later UTokyo Professor Emeritus of Chemistry), to tutor him in physics. Thanks to intensive remedial studies, he eventually succeeded in entering UTokyo’s Department of Physics. Even in university, however, Koshiba continued to struggle academically, particularly in theoretical physics. After graduation, he was able to study abroad at the University of Rochester with the help of a Fulbright Scholarship, secured through a letter of recommendation from Sin-Itiro Tomonaga.

Koshiba married Kyoto Kato, an art museum curator, when he returned to Japan in the late 1950s. The couple had a son and a daughter.

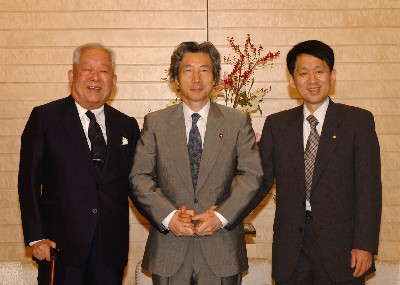
With Jun'ichirō Koizumi and Kōichi Tanaka, at the Prime Minister's Official Residence, October 2002

The day after Koshiba received the Nobel Prize in Physics, Koichi Tanaka, an engineer from Shimadzu Corporation, was awarded the Nobel Prize in Chemistry. This marked the shortest interval between Nobel Prizes awarded to Japanese recipients—less than 24 hours. Compared to Koshiba, whose Nobel Prize had been long anticipated, the relatively unknown Tanaka was hailed as a “salaryman’s Nobel legend” and instantly drew massive media attention. In truth, Koshiba’s displeasure stemmed not from being overshadowed, but from what he considered to be the poor quality of media interviews.

After retirement, Professor Koshiba became enthusiastic about video games and once called himself “the world’s oldest gamer.” His favorite game was Final Fantasy. Additionally, he was a classical music enthusiast, particularly fond of Mozart's work.

He died on November 12, 2020, at the Edogawa Hospital in Tokyo at the age of 94.

== Awards ==
- 1987 – Asahi Prize
- 1987 – Nishina Memorial Prize
- 1989 – Japan Academy Prize (academics)
- 1997 – Humboldt Prize
- 2000 – Wolf Prize in Physics
- 2002 – Nobel Prize in Physics
- 2002 – Panofsky Prize
- 2003 – Benjamin Franklin Medal in Physics

== Honors ==
In 2005, the Graduate School of Science at the University of Tokyo established the Koshiba Hall in honor of his contributions.

- 1985 – Order of Merit of the Federal Republic of Germany
- 1997 – Order of Culture
- 2002 – Honorary citizenship of Suginami
- 2002 – Honorary doctor of Meiji University
- 2002 – Elected Fellow of the American Physical Society.
- 2003 – Grand Cordon of the Order of the Rising Sun
- 2003 – In commemoration of the Nobel Prize-winning by Masatoshi Koshiba, Koshiba hall was established at the University of Tokyo's School of science.
- 2003 – Honorary citizenship of Tokyo
- 2003 – Emeritus Professor of the University of Tokyo

== Publications ==
- Koshiba, M.; Fukuda, Y; et al. (1998). "Evidence for Oscillation of Atmospheric Neutrinos". Physical Review Letters. 81 (8): 1562–1567. arXiv:hep-ex/9807003. Bibcode:1998PhRvL..81.1562F. doi:10.1103/PhysRevLett.81.1562.
- Koshiba, M.; Fukuda, Y; et al. (1999). "Constraints on Neutrino Oscillation Parameters from the Measurement of Day-Night Solar Neutrino Fluxes at Super-Kamiokande". Physical Review Letters. 82 (9): 1810–1814. arXiv:hep-ex/9812009. Bibcode:1999PhRvL..82.1810F. doi:10.1103/PhysRevLett.82.1810. S2CID 119409084.

== See also ==
- Institute for Cosmic Ray Research
- Kamioka Observatory
- List of Japanese Nobel laureates
- List of Nobel Laureates affiliated with the University of Rochester
- List of Nobel laureates affiliated with the University of Tokyo
- University of Rochester
