= Tomonori Totani =

Japanese astronomer

- 戸谷友則
- Born: November 21, 1971 (age 54); Nagoya, Aichi
- Education: University of Tokyo (BS, PhD)
- Scientific career
- Workplaces: National Astronomical Observatory of Japan; Princeton University; Kyoto University
- Doctoral advisor: Katsuhiko Sato

Tomonori Totani (戸谷 友則, Totani Tomonori, born November 21, 1971) is a Japanese astronomer and professor at the University of Tokyo. He is a director of the FastSound Project for the Subaru Telescope, Hawaii. He specializes in cosmology, galaxy formation, and high-energy astrophysics.

== Early life and career ==
Born in Nagoya, Aichi on November 17, 1971. He received his B.S. (1994) and Ph.D. (1998) from the University of Tokyo, under the supervision of Katsuhiki Sato.

After working at the National Astronomical Observatory of Japan (1996-2003) and Princeton University, (2001-2003) he became an assistant professor at Kyoto University in 2003 and an associate professor in 2007. In 2013, he was appointed as a professor at the University of Tokyo.

His most recent work has been on the origin of life. His earlier research topics have included dark matter, dark energy, galaxy formation and evolution, supernovae, gamma-ray bursts, fast radio bursts, active galactic nuclei, and cosmic rays.

== Publications ==
His most cited publications are:

- Totani T. Cosmological fast radio bursts from binary neutron star mergers. Publications of the Astronomical Society of Japan. 2013 Oct 25;65(5):L12. (Cited 269 times, according to Google Scholar)
- Totani T, Kawai N, Kosugi G, Aoki K, Yamada T, Iye M, Ohta K, Hattori T. Implications for cosmic reionization from the optical afterglow spectrum of the gamma-ray burst 050904 at z= 6.3. Publications of the Astronomical Society of Japan. 2006 Jun 25;58(3):485-9 (Cited 361 times, according to Google Scholar.)
- Ota K, Iye M, Kashikawa N, Shimasaku K, Kobayashi M, Totani T, Nagashima M, Morokuma T, Furusawa H, Hattori T, Matsuda Y. Reionization and galaxy evolution probed by z= 7 Lyα emitters. Astrophysical journal. 2008 Apr 10;677(1):1 (Cited 236 times, according to Google Scholar.)
- Totani T. Cosmological gamma-ray bursts and evolution of galaxies. The Astrophysical Journal Letters. 1997 Sep 10;486(2):L71 (Cited 272 times, according to Google Scholar.)
- Totani T, Morokuma T, Oda T, Doi M, Yasuda N. Delay time distribution measurement of Type Ia supernovae by the Subaru/XMM-Newton deep survey and implications for the progenitor. Publications of the Astronomical Society of Japan. 2008 Dec 25;60(6):1327-46. (Cited 260 times, according to Google Scholar.)
