= Irvine–Michigan–Brookhaven (detector) =

Particle detector in Ohio, 1982–1991

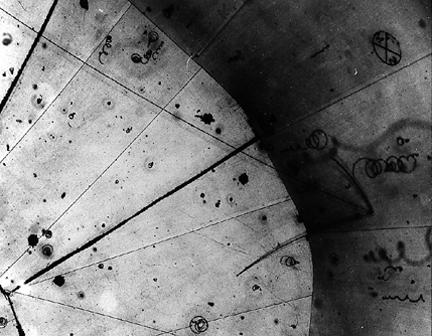
Photograph of a neutrino's trail in a bubble chamber

IMB, the Irvine-Michigan-Brookhaven detector, was a nucleon decay experiment and neutrino observatory located in a Morton Salt company's Fairport mine on the shore of Lake Erie in the United States 600 meters underground. It was a joint venture of the University of California, Irvine, the University of Michigan, and the Brookhaven National Laboratory. Like several other particle detectors (see Kamiokande II), it was built primarily with the goal of observing proton decay, but it achieved greater fame through neutrino observation, particularly those from Supernova SN 1987A.

== Design ==
IMB consisted of a roughly cubical tank about 17 × 17.5 × 23 meters, filled with 2.5 million gallons of ultrapure water which was surrounded by 2,048 photomultiplier tubes. IMB detected fast-moving particles such as those produced by proton decay or neutrino interactions by picking up the Cherenkov radiation generated when such a particle moves faster than light's speed in water. Since directional information was available from the phototubes, IMB was able to estimate the initial direction of neutrinos.

== History ==
Ground was broken at the salt mine in 1979; the water tank for the detector itself was finished in 1981. The project was delayed by funding problems and leaks in the water tank, but by the end of summer 1982 the detector was operating at full capacity. The first results were published in 1982. In 1987, it gained fame for detecting 8 of the roughly 10^{58} neutrinos emitted by Supernova 1987A. This discovery was completely unexpected; supernovas as near as 1987a are extremely rare and virtually unpredictable. The detector collected data until 1991.

This volume of water contains on the order of 10^{31} protons. In one year of observation no proton decay event was recorded. This put the half-life of a proton at or above 10^{31} years.
