= Kamioka Observatory =

Underground physics laboratory in Japan

Coordinates: 36°25.6′N 137°18.7′E

The Kamioka Observatory, Institute for Cosmic Ray Research, University of Tokyo (神岡宇宙素粒子研究施設, Kamioka Uchū Soryūshi Kenkyū Shisetsu; Japanese pronunciation: [kamioka ɯtɕɯː soɾʲɯꜜːɕi keŋkʲɯː ɕiꜜsetsɯ]) is a neutrino and gravitational waves laboratory located ~1 km (2700 mwe) underground in the Mozumi mine of the Kamioka Mining and Smelting Co. near the Kamioka section of the city of Hida in Gifu Prefecture, Japan. Multiple neutrino experiments have taken place at the observatory over two decades. The experiments have contributed to the advancement of particle physics, in particular to the study of neutrino astronomy and neutrino oscillation.

== The mine ==
The Mozumi mine is one of two adjacent mines owned by the Kamioka Mining and Smelting Co. (a subsidiary of the Mitsui Mining and Smelting Co. Mitsui Kinzoku ). The mine is famous as the site of one of the greatest mass-poisonings in Japanese history. From 1910 to 1945, the mine operators released cadmium from the processing plant into the local water. This cadmium caused what the locals called itai-itai disease. The disease caused weakening of the bones and extreme pain.

Although mining operations have ceased, the smelting plant continues to process zinc, lead and silver from other mines and recycling.

While current experiments are all located in the northern Mozumi mine, the Tochibora mine 10 km south is also available. It is not quite as deep, but has stronger rock and is the planned site for the very large Hyper-KamiokaNDE caverns.

== Past experiments ==
=== KamiokaNDE ===
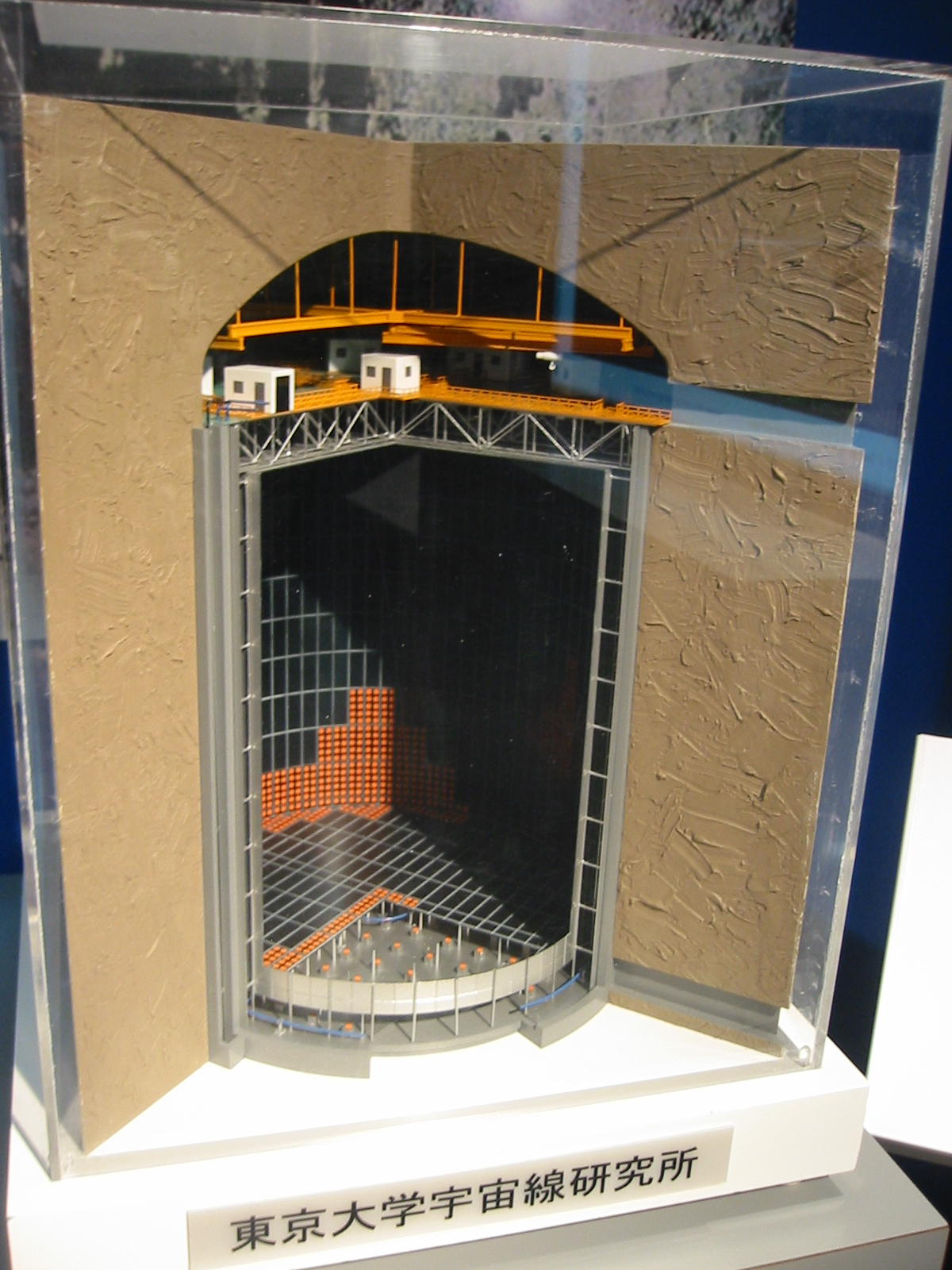
A model of KamiokaNDE

The first of the Kamioka experiments was named KamiokaNDE for Kamioka Nucleon Decay Experiment. It was a large water Cherenkov detector designed to search for proton decay. To observe the decay of a particle with a lifetime as long as a proton an experiment must run for a long time and observe an enormous number of protons. This can be done most cost effectively if the target (the source of the protons) and the detector itself are made of the same material. Water is an ideal candidate because it is inexpensive, easy to purify, stable, and can detect relativistic charged particles through their production of Cherenkov radiation. A proton decay detector must be buried deep underground or in a mountain because the background from cosmic ray muons in such a large detector located on the surface of the Earth would be far too large. The muon rate in the KamiokaNDE experiment was about 0.4 events per second, roughly five orders of magnitude smaller than what it would have been if the detector had been located at the surface.

The distinct pattern produced by Cherenkov radiation allows for particle identification, an important tool for both understanding the potential proton decay signal and for rejecting backgrounds. The identification is possible because the sharpness of the edge of the ring depends on the particle producing the radiation or electrons (and therefore also gamma rays) produce fuzzy rings due to the multiple scattering of the low mass electrons. Minimum ionizing muons, in contrast, produce very sharp rings as their heavier mass allows them to propagate directly.

Construction of the Kamioka Underground Observatory (the predecessor of the present Kamioka Observatory, Institute for Cosmic Ray Research, University of Tokyo) began in 1982 and was completed in April, 1983. The detector was a cylindrical tank which contained 3,000 tons of pure water and had about 1,000 50 cm diameter photomultiplier tubes (PMTs) attached to the inner surface. The size of the outer detector was 16.0 m in height and 15.6 m in diameter. The detector failed to observe proton decay, but set what was then the world's best limit on the lifetime of the proton.

KamiokaNDE-I operated 1983–1985.

=== KamiokaNDE-II ===
The KamiokaNDE-II experiment was a major step forward from KamiokaNDE, and made a significant number of important observations. During this phase the NDE part of the name came to be called "Neutrino Detection Experiment". KamiokaNDE-II operated 1985–1990.

==== Solar neutrinos ====
In the 1930s, Hans Bethe and Carl Friedrich von Weizsäcker had hypothesized that the source of the Sun's energy was fusion reactions in its core. While this hypothesis was widely accepted for decades, there was no way of observing the Sun's core and directly testing the hypothesis. Ray Davis's Homestake Experiment was the first to detect solar neutrinos – strong evidence that the nuclear theory of the Sun was correct. Over a period of decades, the Davis experiment consistently observed only about 1/3 the number of neutrinos predicted by the Standard Solar Models of his colleague and close friend John Bahcall. Because of the great technical difficulty of the experiment and its reliance on radiochemical techniques rather than real time direct detection, many physicists were suspicious of his result.

It was realized that a large water Cherenkov detector could be an ideal neutrino detector, for several reasons. First, the enormous volume possible in a water Cherenkov detector can overcome the problem of the very small cross section of the 5-15 MeV solar neutrinos. Second, water Cherenkov detectors offer real time event detection. This meant that individual neutrino-electron interaction candidate events could be studied on an event-by-event basis, starkly different from the month-to-month observation required in radiochemical experiments. Third, in the neutrino-electron scattering interaction the electron recoils in roughly the direction that the neutrino was travelling (similar to the motion of billiard balls), so the electrons "point back" to the Sun. Fourth, neutrino-electron scattering is an elastic process, so the energy distribution of the neutrinos can be studied, further testing the solar model. Fifth, the characteristic "ring" produced by Cherenkov radiation allows discrimination of the signal against backgrounds. Finally, since a water Cherenkov experiment would use a different target, interaction process, detector technology, and location it would be a very complementary test of Davis's results.

It was clear that KamiokaNDE could be used to perform a fantastic and novel experiment, but a serious problem needed to be overcome first. The presence of a radioactive background in KamiokaNDE meant that the detector had an energy threshold of tens of MeV. The signals produced by proton decay and atmospheric neutrino interactions are considerably larger than this, so the original KamiokaNDE detector had not needed to be particularly aggressive about its energy threshold or resolution. The problem was attacked in two ways. The participants of the KamiokaNDE experiment designed and built new purification systems for the water to reduce the radon background, and instead of constantly cycling the detector with "fresh" mine water they kept the water in the tank allowing the radon to decay away. A group from the University of Pennsylvania joined the collaboration and supplied new electronics with greatly superior timing capabilities. The extra information provided by the electronics further improved the ability to distinguish the neutrino signal from radioactive backgrounds. One further improvement was the expansion of the cavity, and the installation of an instrumented "outer detector". The extra water provided shielding from gamma rays from the surrounding rock, and the outer detector provided a veto for cosmic ray muons.

With the upgrades completed, the experiment was renamed KamiokaNDE-II, and started taking data in 1985. The experiment spent several years fighting the radon problem, and started taking "production data" in 1987. Once 450 days of data had been accumulated, the experiment was able to see a clear enhancement in the number of events which pointed away from the Sun over random directions. The directional information was the smoking gun signature of solar neutrinos, demonstrating directly for the first time that the Sun is a source of neutrinos. The experiment continued to take data for many years and eventually found the solar neutrino flux to be about 1/2 that predicted by solar models. This was in conflict with both the solar models and Davis's experiment, which was ongoing at the time and continued to observe only 1/3 of the predicted signal. This conflict between the flux predicted by solar theory and the radiochemical and water Cherenkov detectors became known as the solar neutrino problem.

==== Atmospheric neutrinos ====
The flux of atmospheric neutrinos is considerably smaller than that of the solar neutrinos, but because the reaction cross sections increase with energy they are detectable in a detector of KamiokaNDE-II's size. The experiment used a "ratio of ratios" to compare the ratio of electron to muon flavor neutrinos to the ratio predicted by theory (this technique is used because many systematic errors cancel each other out). This ratio indicated a deficit of muon neutrinos, but the detector was not large enough to obtain the statistics necessary to call the result a discovery. This result came to be known as the atmospheric neutrino deficit.

==== Supernova 1987A ====
The Kamiokande-II experiment happened to be running at a particularly fortuitous time, as a supernova took place while the detector was online and taking data. With the upgrades that had taken place, the detector was sensitive enough to observe the thermal neutrinos produced by Supernova 1987A, which took place roughly 160,000 light years away in the Large Magellanic Cloud. The neutrinos arrived at Earth in February 1987, and the Kamiokande-II detector observed 11 events.

==== Nucleon decay ====
KamiokaNDE-II continued KamiokaNDE's search for proton decay and again failed to observe it. The experiment once again set a higher lower-bound on the half-life of the proton.

=== Kamiokande-III ===
The final upgrade to the detector, KamiokaNDE-III, operated 1990–1995.

=== Nobel Prize ===
For his work directing the Kamioka experiments, and in particular for the first-ever detection of astrophysical neutrinos Masatoshi Koshiba was awarded the Nobel Prize in Physics in 2002. Raymond Davis Jr. and Riccardo Giacconi were co-winners of the prize.

=== K2K ===
The KEK To Kamioka experiment used accelerator neutrinos to verify the oscillations observed in the atmospheric neutrino signal with a well-controlled and understood beam. A neutrino beam was directed from the KEK accelerator to Super KamiokaNDE. The experiment found oscillation parameters which were consistent with those measured by Super-K.

== Current experiments ==
=== Super Kamiokande ===
By the 1990s particle physicists were starting to suspect that the solar neutrino problem and atmospheric neutrino deficit had something to do with neutrino oscillation. The Super Kamiokande detector was designed to test the oscillation hypothesis for both solar and atmospheric neutrinos. The Super-Kamiokande detector is massive, even by particle physics standards. It consists of 50,000 tons of pure water surrounded by about 11,200 photomultiplier tubes. The detector was again designed as a cylindrical structure, this time 41.4 m (136 ft) tall and 39.3 m (129 ft) across. The detector was surrounded with a considerably more sophisticated outer detector which could not only act as a veto for cosmic muons but actually help in their reconstruction.

Super-Kamiokande started data taking in 1996 and has made several important measurements. These include precision measurement of the solar neutrino flux using the elastic scattering interaction, the first very strong evidence for atmospheric neutrino oscillation, and a considerably more stringent limit on proton decay.

==== Nobel prize ====
For his work with Super Kamiokande, Takaaki Kajita shared the 2015 Nobel prize with Arthur McDonald.

==== Super Kamiokande-II ====
On November 12, 2001, several thousand photomultiplier tubes in the Super-Kamiokande detector imploded, apparently in a chain reaction as the shock wave from the concussion of each imploding tube cracked its neighbours. The detector was partially restored by redistributing the photomultiplier tubes which did not implode, and by adding protective acrylic shells that it was hoped would prevent another chain reaction from recurring. The data taken after the implosion is referred to as the Super Kamiokande-II data.

==== Super Kamiokande-III ====
In July 2005, preparation began to restore the detector to its original form by reinstalling about 6,000 new PMTs. It was finished in June 2006. Data taken with the newly restored machine was called the SuperKamiokande-III dataset.

==== Super Kamiokande-IV ====
In September 2008, the detector finished its latest major upgrade with state-of-the-art electronics and improvements to water system dynamics, calibration and analysis techniques. This enabled SK to acquire its largest dataset yet (SuperKamiokande-IV), which continued until June 2018, when a new detector refurbishment involving a full water drain from the tank and replacement of electronics, PMTs, internal structures and other parts will take place.

=== Tokai To Kamioka (T2K) ===
The "Tokai To Kamioka" long baseline experiment started in 2009. It is making a precision measurement of the atmospheric neutrino oscillation parameters and is helping ascertain the value of θ_{13}. It uses a neutrino beam directed at the Super Kamiokande detector from the Japanese Hadron Facility's 50 GeV (currently 30 GeV) proton synchrotron in Tōkai such that the neutrinos travel a total distance of 295 km (183 mi).

In 2013 T2K observed for the first time the neutrino oscillations in the appearance channel: transformation of muon neutrinos to electron neutrinos. In 2014 the collaboration provided the first constraints on the value of CP violating phase, together with the most precise measurement of the mixing angle θ_{23}.

=== KamLAND ===
The KamLAND experiment is a liquid scintillator detector designed to detect reactor antineutrinos. KamLAND is a complementary experiment to the Sudbury Neutrino Observatory because while the SNO experiment has good sensitivity to the solar mixing angle but poor sensitivity to the squared mass difference, KamLAND has very good sensitivity to the squared mass difference with poor sensitivity to the mixing angle. The data from the two experiments may be combined as long as CPT is a valid symmetry of our universe. The KamLAND experiment is located in the original KamiokaNDE cavity.

=== Cryogenic Laser Interferometer Observatory (CLIO) ===
CLIO is a small gravity wave detector with 100 m (330 ft) arms which is not large enough to detect astronomical gravity waves, but is prototyping cryogenic mirror technologies for the larger KAGRA detector.

=== KAGRA ===
The KAmioka GRAvitational wave detector (formerly LCGT, the Large-scale Cryogenic Gravitational Wave Telescope) is an interferometric gravitational wave detector built inside the Kamioka mine. KAGRA was initially approved in 2010; construction was completed in 2019 and the detector first began observing in 2020.

KAGRA is a Michelson interferometer with 3 km arm length. Uniquely among current gravitational wave detectors, it uses cryogenically cooled mirrors to decrease thermal noise; it is also the first and only underground gravitational wave detector. KAGRA is designed to eventually be able to observe gravitational waves from neutron star binaries at a distance of up to ∼150 Mpc. As of 2026 it had reached a maximum sensitivity of ~7 Mpc and with continuing upgrades is expected to reach a sensitivity of 50-90 Mpc by the early 2030s.

=== XMASS ===
XMASS is an underground liquid scintillator experiment in Kamioka. It has been searching for dark matter.

=== NEWAGE ===
NEWAGE is a direction-sensitive dark-matter-search experiment performed using a gaseous micro-time-projection chamber.

== Future experiments ==
=== Hyper-Kamiokande ===
There is a program to build a detector ten times larger than Super Kamiokande, and this project is known by the name Hyper-Kamiokande. First tank will be operable in the mid-2020s. At the time of 'inauguration' in 2017 the tank(s) is announced to be 20 times greater than the last one (1000 million liters in Hyper-Kamiokande against 50 million in Super-Kamiokande).

== See also ==
- MINOS
- Supernova Early Warning System
- Super-Kamiokande
- Hyper-Kamiokande
