= International Center for Elementary Particle Physics =

Division of the University of Tokyo

Coordinates: 35°42′49.9″N 139°45′48.3″E

The International Center for Elementary Particle Physics (東京大学素粒子物理国際研究センター, Tōkyō Daigaku Soryūshi Butsuri Kokusai Kenkyū Sentā) is a division of the University of Tokyo, Japan dedicated to the study of particle physics. The ICEPP is located on the 10th floor of the Faculty of Science Building #1 at the University of Tokyo.
