= Institute for Cosmic Ray Research =

Institute of the University of Tokyo

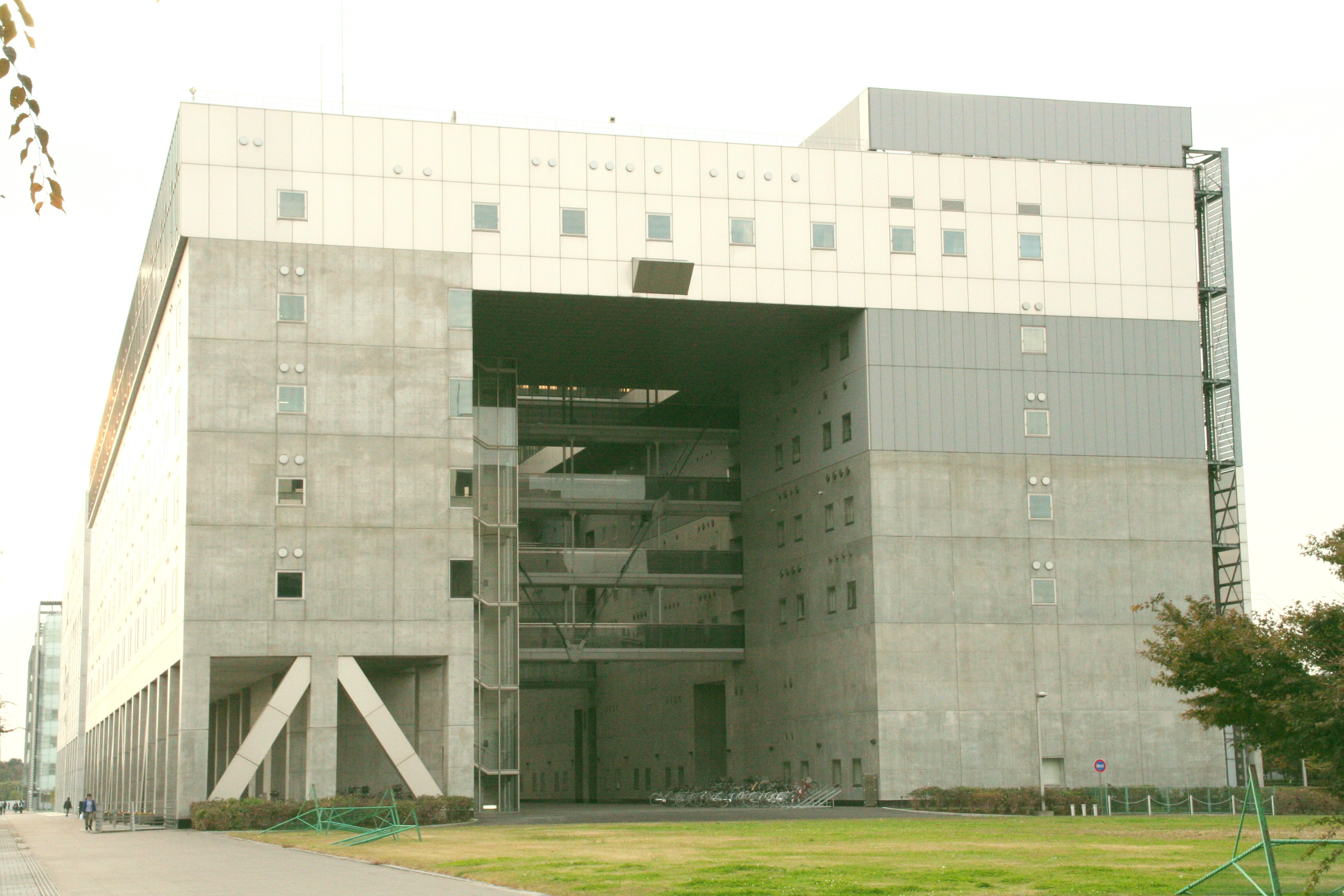
ICRR main building on the Kashiwa Campus

The Institute for Cosmic Ray Research (ICRR) of the University of Tokyo (東京大学宇宙線研究所 Tōkyōdaigaku Uchūsen Kenkyūsho) was established in 1976 for the study of cosmic rays.

The gravitational wave studies group is currently constructing the detector KAGRA located at the Kamioka Observatory.

== Facilities ==
- Kashiwa Campus of the University of Tokyo
- Akeno Observatory
- Kamioka Observatory
- Norikura Observatory

== Current projects ==
- Super-Kamiokande - Detection of neutrinos and search for proton decays in a large water tank
- Tibet - Search for point sources of VHE cosmic gamma rays at Tibet heights
- Telescope Array Project - Aiming at highest energy cosmic ray physics by detecting weak light from atmosphere
- Gravitational Wave Group - Constructing the gravitational wave detector KAGRA
- Observational Cosmology Group - Subaru Hyper Suprime-Cam Survey
- Theory Group - Theoretical studies for verifying Grand Unified Theory and early Universe
- High Energy Astrophysics Group - Theoretical studies for pulsars, gamma-ray bursts, AGNs, acceleration mechanisms of particles etc.
