= List of neutrino experiments =

Neutrino experiments are scientific studies investigating the properties of neutrinos, which are subatomic particles that are very difficult to detect due to their weak interactions with matter. Neutrino experiments are essential for understanding the fundamental properties of matter and the universe's behaviour at the subatomic level. Here is a non-exhaustive list of neutrino experiments and neutrino detectors.

Abbreviation	Full name	Sensitivity^{[a]}	Type	Induced reaction	Type of reaction^{[b]}	Detector	Type of detector	Threshold energy	Location	Operation	Home page
ANNIE	Accelerator Neutrino Neutron Interaction Experiment								SciBooNE Hall, Illinois, United States	2020-	
ANTARES	Astronomy with a Neutrino Telescope and Abyss Environmental RESearch	ATM, CR, AGN, PUL	ν_{e}, ν_{μ}, ν_{τ}			Seawater	Cherenkov		Mediterranean Sea, France	2006–2022	
ARIANNA	Antarctic Ross Ice-Shelf ANtenna Neutrino Array	S, CR, AGN, ?	ν_{e}, ν_{μ}, ν_{τ}						Ross Ice Shelf, Antarctica	future	
BDUNT (NT-200+); Baikal-GVD	Baikal Deep Underwater Neutrino Telescope / Gigaton Volume Detector	S, ATM, LS, AGN, PUL	ν_{e}, ν_{μ}, ν_{τ}		CC, NC	Water (H_{2}O)	Cherenkov	≈10 GeV	Lake Baikal, Russia	1993–	
BOREXINO	BORon EXperiment	LS	ν_{e}	ν_{x} + e^{−} → ν_{x} + e^{−}	ES	LOS shielded by water	Scintillation	250–665 keV	Gran Sasso, Italy	2007–2021	
BUST	Baksan Underground Scintillation Telescope						Scintillation		Baksan River valley, Russia	1977–	
CCM	Coherent CAPTAIN-Mills	AC	ν_{e}		CC	Liquid Argon	Scintillation	50 keV	Los Alamos Neutron Science Center	2019–	
CHANDLER	Carbon Hydrogen AntiNeutrino Detector with a Lithium Enhanced Raghavan-optical-lattice	R	ν̅_{e}	ν̅_{e} + p → e^{+} + n	CC	WLS Plastic Scintillating Cubes and Lithium-6-loaded Zinc Sulfide Sheets	Scintillation	1.8 MeV	North Anna, Virginia, US	June 2017–	
CLEAN	Cryogenic Low-Energy Astrophysics with Neon	LS, SN, WIMP	ν_{e}	ν_{x} + e^{−} → ν_{x} + e^{−} ν_{e} + ^{20}Ne → ν_{e} + ^{20}Ne	ES; ES	Liquid Ne (10 t)	Scintillation		SNOLAB; Ontario, Canada	future	
COBRA	Cadmium zinc telluride 0-neutrino double-Beta Research Apparatus			^{64}Zn + e^{−} → ^{64}Ni + e^{+}^{70}Zn → ^{70}Ge + e^{−} + e^{−}^{106}Cd → ^{106}Pd + e^{+} + e^{+}^{108}Cd + e^{−} + e^{−} → ^{108}Pd^{114}Cd → ^{114}Sn + e^{−} + e^{−}^{116}Cd → ^{116}Sn + e^{−} + e^{−}^{120}Te + e^{−} → ^{120}Sn + e^{+}^{128}Te → ^{128}Xe + e^{−} + e^{−}^{130}Te → ^{130}Xe + e^{−} + e^{−}	BB	Cadmium zinc telluride			Gran Sasso, Italy	2007–	
COHERENT	COHERENT	AC	ν_{μ}, ν̅_{μ}, ν_{e}	ν + nucleus → ν + nucleus	ES (NC), CC	CsI[Na], NaI[Tl], HPGe, LAr	Coherent Elastic Neutrino Nucleus Scattering (CEvNS)	few keV nuclear recoil energy	Spallation Neutron Source at Oak Ridge National Laboratory	Nov 2016–	
CONUS / CONUS+	COherent Neutrino nUcleus Scattering	R	ν̅_{e}	ν̅_{e} + nucleus → ν̅_{e} + nucleus	ES (NC)	HPGe	Coherent Elastic Neutrino Nucleus Scattering (CEvNS)	4 detectors: 160eV, 170eV, 180eV and 250eV	Brokdorf Nuclear Power Plant, Germany (CONUS); Leibstadt Nuclear Power Plant, Switzerland (CONUS+)	2018–2022 (CONUS); 2022–Ongoing (CONUS+)	
Daya Bay	Daya Bay Reactor Neutrino Experiment	R	ν̅_{e}	ν̅_{e} + p → e^{+} + n	CC	Gd-doped LAB (LOS)	Scintillation	1.8 MeV	Daya Bay, China	2011–2020	
Double Chooz	Double Chooz Reactor Neutrino Experiment	R	ν̅_{e}	ν̅_{e} + p → e^{+} + n	CC	Gd-doped LOS	Scintillation	1.8 MeV	Chooz, France	2011–2017	
DUNE	Deep Underground Neutrino Experiment	AC, ATM, (S), SN	all		NC, CC, (ES)	Liquid argon	Scintillation & Time projection chamber	around 10 MeV	Sanford Underground Research Facility	construction start 2017	
ENUBET	Enhanced NeUtrino BEams from kaon Tagging	AC	ν_{e}, ν_{μ} ν̅_{e}, ν̅_{μ}	ν_{e} + n → e^{−} + p (+π, +X) ν_{μ} + n → μ^{−} + p (+π, +X) ν̅_{e} + p → e^{+} + n (+π, +X) ν̅_{μ} + p → μ^{+} + n (+π, +X)	CC (NC)					future	
ESSnuSB	The European Spallation Source neutrino Super Beam	AC	ν_{μ}, ν̅_{μ}(Background: ν_{e},ν̅_{e})			Water	Water Cherenkov MEMPHYS detector	0.36 GeV	Garpenberg, Lund, Sweden	future by 2023	
FASER	ForwArd Search ExpeRiment	C	ν_{e}, ν_{μ}, ν_{τ}	ν + N → ℓ + X	CC + NC	Tungsten	Emulsion	>10 GeV	Large Hadron Collider	2022–	
EXO-200	Enriched Xenon Observatory			^{134}Xe → ^{134}Ba + e^{−} + e^{−}^{136}Xe → ^{136}Ba + e^{−} + e^{−}	BB	Liquid Xenon			WIPP, New Mexico	2009–	
GALLEX	GALLium EXperiment	LS	ν_{e}	ν_{e} + ^{71}Ga → ^{71}Ge + e^{−}	CC	GaCl_{3} (30 t)	Radiochemical	233.2 keV	Gran Sasso, Italy	1991–1997	
GERDA	The GERmanium Detector Array	BB	ν̅_{e}	^{76}Ge → ^{76}As + e^{−} + e^{−}	BB	HPGe	Semiconductor	~20 keV	Gran Sasso, Italy	2015–2019	
GRAND	Giant Radio Array for Neutrino Detection	AGN, CR, ?	ν_{τ}	ν_{τ} + N → τ^{−} + X	CC	Electromagnetic waves caused by τ^{−} through extensive air showers in the atmosphere.	Radio	10^{17} eV	China	Proposed	
HALO	Helium And Lead Observatory	SN	ν_{e}, ν_{x}	ν_{e} + ^{208}Pb → e^{−} + ^{209}Bi* ν + ^{208}Pb → ν + ^{208}Pb*	CC, NC	Lead (79 t) and ^{3}He	High-Z	≈10 MeV	Creighton Mine, Ontario	2012–	
HERON	Helium Roton Observation of Neutrinos	LS	ν_{e} (mainly)	ν_{e} + e^{−} → ν_{e} + e^{−}	NC	Superfluid He	Rotational excitation	1 MeV		future	
HOMESTAKE–CHLORINE	Homestake chlorine experiment	S	ν_{e}	^{37}Cl + ν_{e} → ^{37}Ar* + e^{−}^{37}Ar* → ^{37}Cl + e^{+} + ν_{e}	CC	C_{2}Cl_{4} (615 t)	Radiochemical	814 keV	Homestake Mine, South Dakota	1967–1998	
HOMESTAKE–IODINE	Homestake iodine experiment	S	ν_{e}	ν + e^{−} → ν + e^{−} ν_{e} + ^{127}I → ^{127}Xe + e^{−}	ES; CC	NaI in water	Radiochemical	789 keV	Homestake Mine, South Dakota	future	
Hyper-Kamiokande	Hyper-Kamiokande	S, ATM, SN, AC	ν_{e}, ν_{μ} ν̅_{e}, ν̅_{μ}	ν_{e} + e^{−} → ν_{e} + e^{−} ν_{e} + n → e^{−} + p (+π, +X) ν_{μ} + n → μ^{−} + p (+π, +X) ν̅_{e} + p → e^{+} + n (+π, +X) ν̅_{μ} + p → μ^{+} + n (+π, +X)	ES, CC, (NC)	water	Cherenkov	200 MeV	Tokai and Kamioka, Japan	2027– (under construction)	
ICARUS	Imaging Cosmic And Rare Underground Signal	S, ATM, GSN	ν_{e}, ν_{μ}, ν_{τ}	ν + e^{−} → ν + e^{−}	ES	Liquid Ar	Cherenkov	5.9 MeV	Gran Sasso, Italy	2010–	
IceCube	IceCube Neutrino Detector	ATM, CR, AGN, ?	ν_{e}, ν_{μ}, ν_{τ}	ν + N → ν + Cascade , ν + N → Charged lepton + Cascade	CC, NC	Water ice (1 km^{3})	Cherenkov	≈10 GeV	South Pole, Antarctica	2006–	
India-based Neutrino Observatory	Iron Calorimeter Detector @ India-based Neutrino Observatory	ATM	ν_{μ}	ν_{μ}+Fe→μ^{−}+X	CC (dominant), NC	Magnetised iron (50 kton)	RPC active detector elements	≈0.6 GeV	Theni, Tamil Nadu, India	2012– (lab construction); 2018– (detector operation)	
JUNO	Jiangmen Underground Neutrino Observatory	R	ν̅_{e}	ν̅_{e} + p → e^{+} + n	CC	LAB (LOS) + PPO + Bis-MSB	Scintillation		Kaiping, China	2014– (construction)	
Kamiokande	Kamioka Nucleon Decay Experiment	S, ATM	ν_{e}	ν + e^{−} → ν + e^{−}	ES	Water (H_{2}O)	Cherenkov	7.5 MeV	Kamioka, Japan	1986–1995	
KamLAND	Kamioka Liquid Scintillator Antineutrino Detector	R	ν̅_{e}	ν̅_{e} + p → e^{+} + n	CC	LOS	Scintillation	1.8 MeV	Kamioka, Japan	2002–	
KATRIN	Karlsruhe Tritium Neutrino experiment	MTR, ATR	ν̅_{e}	^{3}H → ^{3}He + e^{−} + ν̅_{e}	CC	Spectrometer	Semiconductor	≈ 0.45 eV	Germany	2019-	
KM3NeT	KM3 Neutrino Telescope	S, ATM, CR, SN, AGN, PUL	ν_{μ},ν_{e},ν_{τ}			Sea water (≈5 km^{3})	Cherenkov		Mediterranean Sea	2014–	
LAGUNA	Large Apparatus studying Grand Unification and Neutrino Astrophysics									future	
LEGEND	The Large Enriched Germanium Experiment for Neutrinoless ββ Decay	BB	ν̅_{e}	^{76}Ge → ^{76}As + e^{−} + e^{−}	BB	HPGe	Semiconductor	~50 keV	Gran Sasso, Italy	2023–	
LENS	Low Energy Neutrino Spectroscopy	LS	ν_{e}	ν_{e} + ^{115}In → ^{115}Sn + ν_{e} + 2γ	CC	In-doped LOS	Scintillation	120 keV		proposed	
Majorana Demonstrator	The Majorana Demonstrator	BB	ν̅_{e}	^{76}Ge → ^{76}As + e^{−} + e^{−}	BB	HPGe	Semiconductor	~2 keV	Homestake Mine, South Dakota	2015–2021	
MicroBooNE		AC, SN	ν_{e}, ν_{μ}		ES, NC, CC	Liquid Argon	TPC	few MeV	Illinois, United States	2014–	
MINERvA	Main Injector ExpeRiment for v-A	AC	ν_{μ}	many	CC, NC	Solid scintillator, targets of Liquid helium, Carbon, Water, Iron, Lead	Scintillation	≈0.5 GeV	Illinois, United States	2009–2019	
MiniBooNE	Mini Booster Neutrino Experiment	AC	ν_{e}, ν_{μ}	ν_{e} + ^{12}C → e^{−} + X	CC	Mineral oil (1000 t)	Cherenkov	≈100 keV	Illinois, United States	2002–	
MINOS	Main Injector Neutrino Oscillation Search	AC, ATM	ν_{e}, ν_{μ}	ν_{μ}+nucleus → μ^{−}+X	CC, NC	Solid scintillator	Scintillation	≈0.5 GeV	Illinois and Minnesota, United States	2005–2012	
MINOS+	Upgraded electronics for MINOS	AC, ATM	ν_{e}, ν_{μ},	ν_{μ}+nucleus → μ^{−}+X	CC, NC	Solid scintillator	Scintillation	≈0.5 GeV	Illinois and Minnesota, United States	2013–	
MOON	Molybdenum Observatory Of Neutrinos	LS, LSN	ν_{e}	ν_{e} + ^{100}Mo → ^{100}Tc + e^{−}	CC	^{100}Mo (1 kt) + MoF6 (gas)	Scintillation	168 keV	Washington, United States		
NEMO-3	Neutrino Ettore Majorana Observatory	BB	ν_{e}	^{100}Mo → ^{100}Ru + 2 e^{−}^{100}Se → ^{100}Kr + 2 e^{−}	BB	Tracker + calorimeter	He+Ar wire chamber, plastic scintillators	150 keV	Modane Underground Laboratory, Fréjus Road Tunnel, France	2003–2011	
NEMO Telescope	NEutrino Mediterranean Observatory								Mediterranean Sea, Italy	2007–	
Neutrino-4	Neutrino-4 Reactor Neutrino Experiment	R	ν̅_{e}	ν̅_{e} + p → e^{+} + n	CC	liquid organic scintillator loaded with Gd	Scintillation	≈2 MeV	Dimitrovgrad, Russia	2014–	
NEVOD	Cherenkov water detector NEVOD	ATM, CR	ν_{μ}	ν_{μ} + n → μ^{−} + p ν_{μ} + p → μ^{+} + n	CC	Water (H_{2}O)	Cherenkov	≈2 GeV	Moscow, Russia	1993–	
NEXT	Neutrino Experiment with a Xenon Time Projection Chamber	BB		^{136}Xe → ^{136}Ba + 2 e^{−}	BB	Gaseous Xenon	Time projection chamber	≈10 keV	Canfranc, Spain	2016–	
NOνA	NuMI Off-Axis ν_{e} Appearance	AC	ν_{e}, ν_{μ}	ν_{e}+nucleus → e^{−}+X	CC	Liquid scintillator	Scintillation	≈0.1 GeV	Illinois and Minnesota, United States	2011–	
NUCLEUS	NUCLEUS	R	ν̅_{e}	ν̅_{e} + nucleus → ν̅_{e} + nucleus	ES (NC)	CaWO4 / Al2O3	Phonon-mediated Transition-edge sensor Bolometer	20 eV	Technical University of Munich, Germany (Development); Chooz Nuclear Power Plant, France	2017 (R&D); Future (Experiment)	
OPERA	Oscillation Project with Emulsion-tRacking Apparatus	AC	ν_{τ}	ν_{τ}+nucleus → τ^{−}+X	CC	Lead/Emulsion	Nuclear Emulsion	≈1.0 GeV	LNGS (Italy) and CERN	2008–	
Auger	Pierre Auger Observatory	CR					Cherenkov		Argentina		
Project 8	Project 8 experiment	ATR	ν̅_{e}	^{3}H → ^{3}He + e^{−} + ν̅_{e}	CC	Microwave Cavity	Radio	≈ 0.04 eV	USA, Germany	future	
RENO	Reactor Experiment for Neutrino Oscillation	R	ν̅_{e}	ν̅_{e} + p → e^{+} + n	CC	Gd-doped LOS	Scintillation	1.8 MeV	South Korea	2011–	
RNO-G	Radio Neutrino Observatory Greenland	CR, AGN, ?	ν_{e}, ν_{μ}, ν_{τ}		CC, NC	In-Ice	Radio	>10 PeV	Summit Camp, Greenland	2021–	
SAGE	Soviet–American Gallium Experiment	LS	ν_{e}	ν_{e} + ^{71}Ga → ^{71}Ge + e^{−}	CC	Ga (metallic)	Radiochemical	233.2 keV	Baksan River valley, Russia	1989–	
SciBooNE	SciBar (Scintillator Bar) Booster Neutrino Experiment	AC	ν_{μ}	ν_{μ} + ^{12}C → μ^{−} + X	CC, NC	Plastic (CH,10 ton)	Scintillation	≈100 keV	Illinois, United States	2007–2008	
SNO	Sudbury Neutrino Observatory	S, ATM, GSN	ν_{e}, ν_{μ}, ν_{τ}	ν_{e} + ^{2}D → 2p + e^{−} ν_{x} + ^{2}D → ν_{x} + n + p ν_{e} + e^{−} → ν_{e} + e^{−}	CC; NC; ES	Heavy water (1 kt D_{2}O)	Cherenkov	3.5 MeV	Creighton Mine, Ontario	1999–2006	
SNO+	SNO with liquid scintillator	S,LS,R,T, SN,LSN	ν_{e}	ν_{x} + e^{−} → ν_{x} + e^{−} ν̅_{e} + p → e^{+} + n	ES, BB	linear alkylbenzene (LAB) + PPO	Scintillation	≈≤1MeV	Creighton Mine, Ontario	2014–	
SoLid	Short baseline Oscillation Search with Lithium-6 Detector	R	ν̅_{e}	ν̅_{e} + p → e^{+} + n	CC	plastic and anorganic scintillator	Scintillation	≈2 MeV	Mol, Belgium	2015–	
STEREO	STErile neutrino REactor Oscillation experiment	R	ν̅_{e}	ν̅_{e} + p → e^{+} + n	CC	liquid organic scintillator loaded with Gd	Scintillation	≈2 MeV	Grenoble, France	2013–	
Super-K	Super-Kamiokande	S, ATM, GSN	ν_{e}, ν_{μ}, ν_{τ}	ν_{e} + e^{−} → ν_{e} + e^{−} ν_{e} + n → e^{−} + p ν_{e} + p → e^{+} + n	ES; CC; CC	Water (H_{2}O)	Cherenkov	200 MeV	Kamioka, Japan	1996–	
SuperNEMO	SuperNEMO	BB	ν_{e}	^{100}Se → ^{100}Kr + 2 e^{−}^{150}Nd → ^{150}Sm + 2 e^{−}	BB	Tracker + calorimeter	He+Ar wire chamber, plastic scintillators	150 keV	Modane Underground Laboratory, Fréjus Road Tunnel, France	2017–	
TRIDENT	TRopIcal DEep-sea Neutrino Telescope	S, ATM, CR, SN, AGN, PUL	ν_{e}, ν_{μ}, ν_{τ}		CC, NC	Seawater (7.5 cubic km)	Cherenkov		Western Pacific Ocean	Proposed Pilot: 2026; Full operation: 2030	
T2K	Tokai to Kamioka	AC	ν_{e}, ν_{μ} ν̅_{e}, ν̅_{μ}	ν_{e} + n → e^{−} + p (+π, +X) ν_{μ} + n → μ^{−} + p (+π, +X) ν̅_{e} + p → e^{+} + n (+π, +X) ν̅_{μ} + p → μ^{+} + n (+π, +X)	CC (NC)	Water (H_{2}O)	Cherenkov	200 MeV	Tokai, Japan Kamioka, Japan	2011–	
UNO	Underground Nucleon decay and neutrino Observatory	S, ATM, GSN, RSN	ν_{e}, ν_{μ}, ν_{τ}	ν_{e} + e^{−} → ν_{e} + e^{−}	ES	Water (440 kt H_{2}O)	Cherenkov		Henderson Mine, Colorado	abandoned	

^[a] Accelerator neutrino (AC), Active galactic nuclei neutrino (AGN), Atmospheric neutrino (ATM), Collider neutrino (C), Cosmic ray neutrino (CR), Low-energy solar neutrino (LS), Low-energy supernova neutrino (LSN), Pulsar neutrino (PUL), Reactor neutrino (R), Solar neutrino (S), Supernova neutrino (SN), Terrestrial neutrino (T), Molecular Tritium neutrino (MTR), Atomic Tritium neutrino (ATR), Electron Capture neutrino (EC).
^[b] Double beta decay (BB), Charged current (CC), Elastic scattering (ES), Neutral current (NC).

== See also ==
- Aspera European Astroparticle network
