= Neutrino =

Elementary particle with extremely low mass

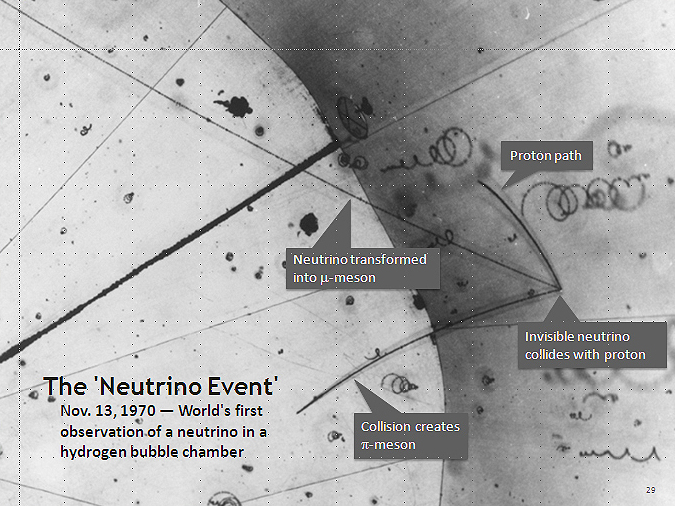
- The first use of a hydrogen bubble chamber to detect neutrinos, on 13 November 1970, at Argonne National Laboratory. Here a neutrino hits a proton in a hydrogen atom; the collision occurs at the point where three tracks emanate on the right of the photograph.
- Composition: Elementary particle
- Statistics: Fermionic
- Family: Leptons, antileptons
- Generation: First (ν_{e}), second (ν_{μ}), and third (ν_{τ})
- Interactions: Weak interaction and gravitation
- Symbol: ν_{e} , ν_{μ} , ν_{τ} , ν̅_{e} , ν̅_{μ} , ν̅_{τ}
- Particle: spin: ± 1/2ħ, chirality: Left, weak isospin: +1/2, lepton nr.: +1, "flavor" in { e, μ, τ }
- Antiparticle: spin: ± 1/2ħ, chirality: Right, weak isospin: −1/2, lepton nr.: −1, "flavor" in { e̅, μ̅, τ̅ }
- Theorized: ν_{e}, electron neutrino: Wolfgang Pauli (1930); ν_{μ}, muon neutrino: late 1940s; ν_{τ}, tau neutrino: mid-1970s
- Discovered: ν_{e}: Clyde Cowan, Frederick Reines (1956); ν_{μ}: Leon Lederman, Melvin Schwartz and Jack Steinberger (1962); ν_{τ}: DONUT collaboration (2000)
- Types: 3 types: electron neutrino (ν_{e}), muon neutrino (ν_{μ}), and tau neutrino (ν_{τ})
- Mass: < 0.120 eV/c^{2} (< 2.14×10^{−37} kg), cosmological limit, sum of 3 "flavors"
- Electric charge: 0 e
- Spin: ħ/2
- Weak isospin: LH: +1/2, RH: 0
- Weak hypercharge: LH: −1, RH: 0
- B − L: −1
- X: −3

A neutrino (/njuːˈtriːnoʊ/ new-TREE-noh; denoted by the Greek letter ν) is an elementary particle that interacts with other matter only via the weak interaction and gravity. It is electrically neutral, and its mass is so small that it was long thought to be zero. Neutrinos usually pass through other matter with no detectable effect because the weak force has a very short range, and their gravitational interaction is extremely weak due to the tiny mass of the neutrino.

Neutrinos are created in weak decays such as beta decay. The state of a neutrino is dynamic: it is created in one of three "flavors": electron, muon, or tau neutrinos associated with the corresponding charged lepton, but changes with time. Although neutrinos were long believed to be massless, it is now thought that there are three discrete neutrino masses with different values, all tiny. This is because neutrinos have been found to oscillate between the different flavors in flight. For example, an electron neutrino produced in a beta decay reaction may interact in a distant detector as a muon or tau neutrino. The three mass values are not yet known as of 2026, but laboratory experiments and cosmological observations have determined the differences of their squares, an upper limit on their sum (< 0.120 eV/c^{2}), and an upper limit on the mass of the electron neutrino.

Neutrinos are fermions, particles with a spin of ħ/2. For each neutrino, there also exists a corresponding antineutrino, which also has spin of ħ/2 and no electric charge. Antineutrinos have the opposite-signed lepton number and weak isospin to neutrinos, and right-handed instead of left-handed chirality. To conserve total lepton number (in nuclear beta decay), electron neutrinos only appear together with positrons (anti-electrons) or electron-antineutrinos, whereas electron antineutrinos only appear with electrons or electron neutrinos.

Neutrinos are created by various radioactive decays. These include the beta decay of atomic nuclei or hadrons and natural nuclear reactions such as those that take place in the core of a star. Other mechanisms include artificial nuclear reactions in nuclear reactors, nuclear bombs, or particle accelerators, supernovas, during the spin-down of a neutron star and when cosmic rays or accelerated particle beams strike atoms.

The majority of neutrinos which are detected about the Earth are from nuclear reactions inside the Sun. At the surface of the Earth, the flux is about 65 billion (6.5×10^{10}) solar neutrinos, per second per square centimeter. Neutrinos can be used for tomography of the interior of the Earth.

== History ==
=== Background ===
The invention of quantum mechanics in the middle of the 1920s solved many outstanding problems in atomic physics, but the model did not include the effects of relativity. The existing model for the nucleus assumed that it contained the only two known particles, protons and electrons. Electrons emerged from nuclei in beta decay, leaving a daughter nucleus with a different atomic number and mass. The known size of the nucleus together with the electron velocity based on uncertainty principle from quantum mechanics for a electron confined in the nucleus meant a relativistic model was required to explain the decay. In 1929 ,experimental results confirmed that beta decay electrons emerge with a continuous range of energies and that gamma ray emission did not explain how the decay could result in two particles with a variety of different energies. Many exotic suggestions were discussed, including one from Niels Bohr, who proposed abandoning energy conservation in individual decays while maintaining a statistical version of the law.

=== Pauli's proposal ===
The neutrino was postulated first by Wolfgang Pauli in 1930 to explain how beta decay could conserve energy, momentum, and angular momentum (spin). Pauli hypothesized an undetected particle that he called a "neutron", using the same -on ending employed for naming both the proton and the electron. He considered that the new particle was emitted from the nucleus together with the beta particles (electrons or positrons) and had a mass similar to the electron.

James Chadwick discovered a much more massive neutral nuclear particle in 1932 and named it a neutron also, leaving two kinds of particles with the same name. The word "neutrino" entered the scientific vocabulary through Enrico Fermi, who used it during a conference in Paris in July 1932 and at the Solvay Conference in October 1933, where Pauli also employed it. The name (the Italian equivalent of "little neutral one") was jokingly coined by Italian physicist Edoardo Amaldi during a conversation with Fermi at the Institute of Physics of via Panisperna in Rome, to distinguish this light neutral particle from Chadwick's heavy neutron.

In Fermi's theory of beta decay, Chadwick's large neutral particle could decay to a proton, electron, and the smaller neutral particle (now called an electron antineutrino):

n^{0} → p^{+} + e^{−} + ν̅_{e}

Fermi's paper, written in 1934, unified Pauli's neutrino with Paul Dirac's positron and Werner Heisenberg's neutron–proton model and gave a solid theoretical basis for future experimental work.

By 1934, there was experimental evidence against Bohr's idea that energy conservation is invalid for beta decay: At the Solvay conference of that year, measurements of the energy spectra of beta particles (electrons) were reported, showing that there is a strict limit on the energy of electrons from each type of beta decay. Such a limit is not expected if the conservation of energy is invalid, in which case any amount of energy would be statistically available in at least a few decays. The natural explanation of the beta decay spectrum as first measured in 1934 was that only a limited (and conserved) amount of energy was available, and a new particle was sometimes taking a varying fraction of this limited energy, leaving the rest for the beta particle. Pauli made use of the occasion to publicly emphasize that the still-undetected "neutrino" must be an actual particle. The first evidence of the reality of neutrinos came in 1938 via simultaneous cloud-chamber measurements of the electron and the recoil of the nucleus.

=== Direct detection ===
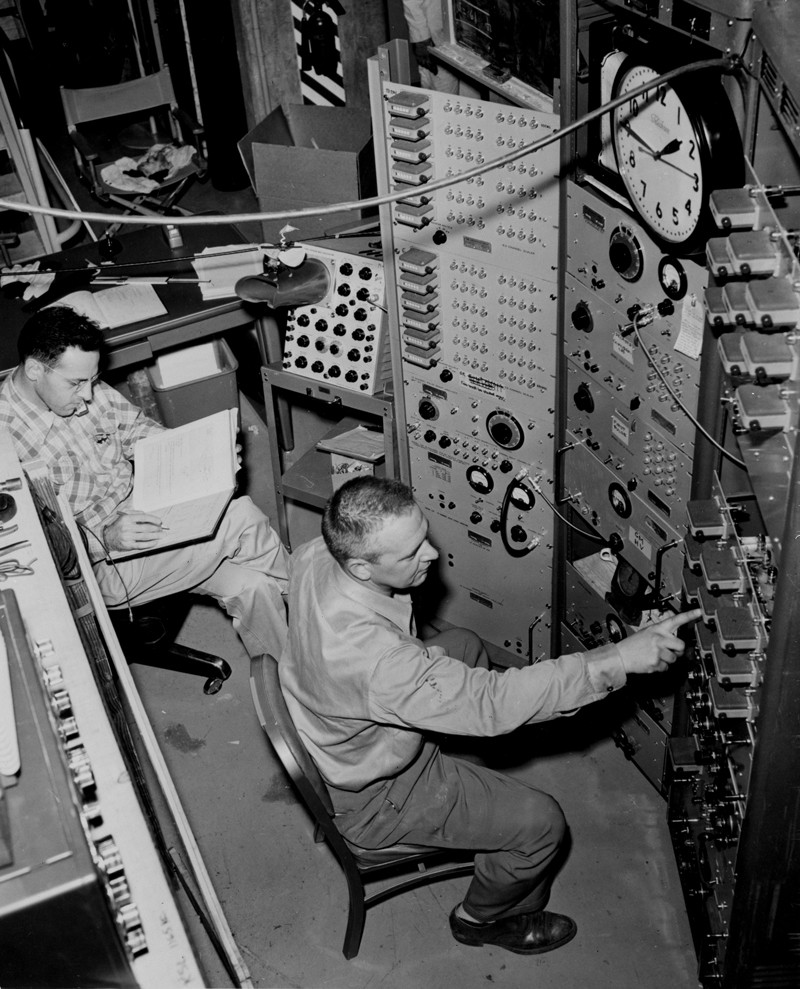
Fred Reines and Clyde Cowan conducting the neutrino experiment c. 1956

In 1942, Wang Ganchang first proposed the use of beta capture to experimentally detect neutrinos. In the 20 July 1956 issue of Science, Clyde Cowan, Frederick Reines, Francis B. "Kiko" Harrison, Herald W. Kruse, and Austin D. McGuire published confirmation that they had detected the neutrino, a result that was rewarded almost forty years later with the 1995 Nobel Prize.

In this experiment, now known as the Cowan–Reines neutrino experiment, antineutrinos created in a nuclear reactor by beta decay reacted with protons to produce neutrons and positrons:

ν̅_{e} + p^{+} → n^{0} + e^{+}

The positron quickly finds an electron, and they annihilate each other. The two resulting gamma rays (γ) are detectable. The neutron can be detected by its capture on an appropriate nucleus, releasing a gamma ray. The coincidence of both events—positron annihilation and neutron capture—gives a unique signature of an antineutrino interaction.

In February 1965, the first neutrino found in nature was identified by a group including Frederick Reines and Friedel Sellschop. The experiment was performed in a specially prepared chamber at a depth of 3 km in the East Rand ("ERPM") gold mine near Boksburg, South Africa. A plaque in the main building commemorates the discovery. The experiments also implemented a primitive neutrino astronomy and looked at issues of neutrino physics and weak interactions.

=== Neutrino flavor ===
The antineutrino discovered by Clyde Cowan and Frederick Reines was the antiparticle of the electron neutrino.

In 1962, Leon M. Lederman, Melvin Schwartz, and Jack Steinberger showed that more than one type of neutrino exists by first detecting interactions of the muon neutrino (already hypothesised with the name neutretto), which earned them the 1988 Nobel Prize in Physics.

When the third type of lepton, the tau, was discovered in 1975 at the Stanford Linear Accelerator Center, it was also expected to have an associated neutrino (the tau neutrino). The first evidence for this third neutrino type came from the observation of missing energy and momentum in tau decays analogous to the beta decay leading to the discovery of the electron neutrino. The first detection of tau neutrino interactions was announced in 2000 by the DONUT collaboration at Fermilab; its existence had already been inferred by both theoretical consistency and experimental data from the Large Electron–Positron Collider.

=== Solar neutrino problem ===
In the 1960s, the now-famous Homestake experiment made the first measurement of the flux of electron neutrinos arriving from the core of the Sun and found a value that was between one third and one half the number predicted by the Standard Solar Model. This discrepancy, which became known as the solar neutrino problem, remained unresolved for some thirty years, while possible problems with both the experiment and the solar model were investigated, but none could be found. Eventually, it was realized that both were actually correct and that the discrepancy between them was due to neutrinos being more complex than was previously assumed. It was postulated that the three neutrinos had nonzero and slightly different masses, and could therefore oscillate into undetectable flavors on their flight to the Earth. This hypothesis was investigated by a new series of experiments, thereby opening a new major field of research that still continues. Eventual confirmation of the phenomenon of neutrino oscillation led to two Nobel prizes, one to R. Davis, who conceived and led the Homestake experiment and Masatoshi Koshiba of Kamiokande, whose work confirmed it, and one to Takaaki Kajita of Super-Kamiokande and A.B. McDonald of Sudbury Neutrino Observatory for their joint experiment, which confirmed the existence of all three neutrino flavors and found no deficit.

=== Oscillation ===
A practical method for investigating neutrino oscillations was first suggested by Bruno Pontecorvo in 1957 using an analogy with kaon oscillations. In 1985 Stanislav Mikheyev and Alexei Smirnov, expanding on 1978 work by Lincoln Wolfenstein, noted that flavor oscillations can be modified when neutrinos propagate through matter. This effect, named the Mikheyev–Smirnov–Wolfenstein (MSW) effect, is important because many neutrinos emitted by fusion in the Sun pass through the dense matter in the solar core where most solar fusion takes place on their way to detectors on Earth.

Starting in 1998, experiments such as Super-Kamiokande and the Sudbury Neutrino Observatory began to suggest that solar and atmospheric neutrinos change flavors. This resolved the solar neutrino problem: the electron neutrinos produced in the Sun had partly changed into other flavors which the experiments could not detect.

The KamLAND experiment identified oscillations as the neutrino flavor conversion mechanism involved in the solar electron neutrinos. Similarly MINOS confirmed the oscillation of atmospheric neutrinos and gave a better determination of the mass squared splitting. Takaaki Kajita of the Super-Kamiokande experiment and Arthur B. McDonald of the Sudbury Neutrino Observatory received the 2015 Nobel Prize for Physics for their landmark finding that neutrinos can change flavors.

=== Cosmic neutrinos ===
As well as specific sources, a general background level of neutrinos is expected to pervade the universe, theorized to occur due to two main sources: the Big Bang and supernovae. Around 1 second after the Big Bang, neutrinos decoupled, giving rise to a background level of neutrinos known as the cosmic neutrino background (CNB). A second diffuse neutrino background is supernova-originated.

Raymond Davis, Jr. and Masatoshi Koshiba were jointly awarded the 2002 Nobel Prize in Physics for pioneering work on solar neutrino detection. Koshiba's work also resulted in the first real-time observation of neutrinos from the SN 1987A supernova in the nearby Large Magellanic Cloud. These efforts marked the beginning of neutrino astronomy.

SN 1987A represents the only verified detection of neutrinos from a supernova. However, many stars have exploded as supernovae in the universe, leaving a theorized diffuse supernova neutrino background.

== Properties and reactions ==
Neutrinos are fermions; therefore they have half-integer spin. Neutrinos are leptons; therefore they do not interact with the gluons of the strong force. They have only been observed to interact through the weak force, although it is assumed that they also interact gravitationally. Since they have non-zero mass, some theories permit, but do not require, neutrinos to interact magnetically; as yet there is no experimental evidence for a non-zero magnetic moment in neutrinos.

=== Flavor, mass, and their mixing ===
Weak interactions create neutrinos in one of three leptonic flavors: electron neutrinos (ν_{e}), muon neutrinos (ν_{μ}), or tau neutrinos (ν_{τ}), associated with the corresponding charged leptons, the electron (e^{−}), muon (μ^{−}), and tau (τ^{−}), respectively.

Although neutrinos were long believed to be massless, it is now known that there are three discrete neutrino masses; each neutrino flavor state is a linear combination of the three distinct mass eigenstates. From calculations based on cosmological models, the sum of the three neutrino masses must be below 0.120 eV/c^{2}. Measurements by the Karlsruhe Tritium Neutrino (KATRIN) experiment found the upper limit of the mass of the electron antineutrino to be 0.45 eV/c^{2}, which is at least 5 orders of magnitude below the next lightest fermion. This large ratio suggests the possibility that the mass-creation mechanism for neutrinos differs from that of other fermions.

Mass comparisons
	Mass [MeV/c²]	Charge	Source
Electron e^{−}	0.5110	−1 e	
Electron anti-neutrino ν_{e}	< 0.45×10^{−6}	0	
Muon μ^{−}	105.658	−1 e	
Muon neutrino ν_{μ}	< 0.17×10^{−6}	0	
Tau τ^{−}	1777	−1 e	
Tau neutrino ν_{τ}	< 18.2×10^{−6}	0	

More formally, neutrino flavor eigenstates (creation and annihilation combinations) are not the same as the neutrino mass eigenstates (simply labeled "1", "2", and "3"). As of 2024, it is not known which of these three is the heaviest. The neutrino mass hierarchy consists of two possible configurations. In analogy with the mass hierarchy of the charged leptons, the configuration with mass 2 being lighter than mass 3 is conventionally called the "normal hierarchy", while in the "inverted hierarchy", the opposite would hold. Several major experimental efforts are underway to help establish which is correct.

A neutrino created in a specific flavor eigenstate is in an associated specific quantum superposition of all three mass eigenstates. The three masses differ so little that they cannot be distinguished experimentally within any practical flight path. The proportion of each mass state in the pure flavor states produced has been found to depend profoundly on the flavor. The relationship between flavor and mass eigenstates is encoded in the PMNS matrix. Experiments have established moderate- to low-precision values for the elements of this matrix, with the single complex phase in the matrix being only poorly known, as of 2016.

A non-zero mass means neutrinos could have a tiny magnetic moment. If so, neutrinos would interact electromagnetically, albeit probably undetectably considering their enormous velocities. No such interaction has ever been observed.

=== Flavor oscillations ===
Neutrinos oscillate between different flavors in flight. For example, an electron neutrino produced in a beta decay reaction may interact in a distant detector as a muon or tau neutrino, as defined by the flavor of the charged lepton produced in the detector. This oscillation occurs because the three mass state components of the produced flavor travel at slightly different speeds, so that their quantum mechanical wave packets develop relative phase shifts that change how they combine to produce a varying superposition of three flavors. Each flavor component thereby oscillates as the neutrino travels, with the flavors varying in relative strengths. The relative flavor proportions when the neutrino interacts represent the relative probabilities for that flavor of interaction to produce the corresponding flavor of charged lepton.

There are other possibilities in which neutrinos could oscillate even if they were massless: If Lorentz symmetry were not an exact symmetry, neutrinos could experience Lorentz-violating oscillations.

=== Mikheyev–Smirnov–Wolfenstein effect ===
Neutrinos traveling through matter can interact with electrons and the interaction differs for electron neutrinos compared to muon- or tau-neutrinos. This difference alters the neutrino oscillations, called the Mikheyev–Smirnov–Wolfenstein effect after the theorists who proposed it. Under certain conditions of electron number density the effect can be amplified. These conditions may be encountered by solar neutrinos at some point as they travel through the Sun, providing a possible explanation of the observed solar neutrino problem.

=== Antineutrinos ===
For each neutrino, there also exists a corresponding antiparticle, called an antineutrino, which also has no electric charge and half-integer spin. They are distinguished from the neutrinos by having opposite signs of lepton number and opposite chirality (and consequently opposite-sign weak isospin). As of 2016, no evidence has been found for any other difference.

So far, despite extensive and continuing searches for exceptions, in all observed leptonic processes there has never been any change in total lepton number; for example, if the total lepton number is zero in the initial state, then the final state has only matched lepton and anti-lepton pairs: electron neutrinos appear in the final state together with only positrons (anti-electrons) or electron antineutrinos, and electron antineutrinos with electrons or electron neutrinos.

Antineutrinos are produced in nuclear beta decay together with a beta particle (in beta decay a neutron decays into a proton, electron, and antineutrino). All antineutrinos observed thus far had right-handed helicity (i.e., only one of the two possible spin states has ever been seen), while neutrinos were all left-handed. Nevertheless, because neutrinos have mass, their helicity is frame-dependent, so particle physicists have fallen back on the frame-independent property of chirality that is closely related to helicity, and for practical purposes the same as the helicity of the ultra-relativistic neutrinos that can be observed in detectors.

Antineutrinos were first detected as a result of their interaction with protons in a large tank of water. This was installed next to a nuclear reactor as a controllable source of the antineutrinos (see Cowan–Reines neutrino experiment). Researchers around the world have begun to investigate the possibility of using antineutrinos for reactor monitoring in the context of preventing the proliferation of nuclear weapons.

=== Majorana mass ===
Because antineutrinos and neutrinos are neutral particles, it is possible that they are the same particle. Rather than conventional Dirac fermions, neutral particles can be another type of spin 1/2 particle called Majorana particles, named after the Italian physicist Ettore Majorana who first proposed the concept. For the case of neutrinos this theory has gained popularity as it can be used, in combination with the seesaw mechanism, to explain why neutrino masses are so small compared to those of the other elementary particles, such as electrons or quarks. Majorana neutrinos would have the property that the neutrino and antineutrino could be distinguished only by chirality; what experiments observe as a difference between the neutrino and antineutrino could simply be due to one particle with two possible chiralities.

As of 2019, it is not known whether neutrinos are Majorana or Dirac particles. It is possible to test this property experimentally. For example, if neutrinos are indeed Majorana particles, then lepton-number violating processes such as neutrinoless double-beta decay would be allowed, while they would not if neutrinos are Dirac particles. Several experiments have been and are being conducted to search for this process, e.g. GERDA, EXO, SNO+, and CUORE. The cosmic neutrino background is also a probe of whether neutrinos are Majorana particles, since there should be a different number of cosmic neutrinos detected in either the Dirac or Majorana case.

=== Nuclear reactions ===
Neutrinos can interact with a nucleus, changing it to a different nucleus. This process is used in radiochemical neutrino detectors. In this case, the energy levels and spin states within the target nucleus have to be taken into account to estimate the probability for an interaction. In general the interaction probability increases with the number of neutrons and protons within a nucleus.

It is very hard to uniquely identify neutrino interactions among the natural background of radioactivity. For this reason, in early experiments a special reaction channel was chosen to facilitate the identification: the interaction of an antineutrino with one of the hydrogen nuclei in the water molecules. A hydrogen nucleus is a single proton, so simultaneous nuclear interactions, which would occur within a heavier nucleus, do not need to be considered for the detection experiment. Within a cubic meter of water placed right outside a nuclear reactor, only relatively few such interactions can be recorded, but the setup is now used for measuring the reactor's plutonium production rate.

=== Induced fission and other disintegration events ===
Very much like neutrons do in nuclear reactors, neutrinos can induce fission reactions within heavy nuclei. So far, this reaction has not been measured in a laboratory, but is predicted to happen within stars and supernovae. The process affects the abundance of isotopes seen in the universe. Neutrino-induced disintegration of deuterium nuclei has been observed in the Sudbury Neutrino Observatory, which uses a heavy water detector.

=== Types ===
Neutrinos in the Standard Model of elementary particles
Fermion	Symbol
Generation 1
Electron neutrino	ν_{e}
Electron antineutrino	ν̅_{e}
Generation 2
Muon neutrino	ν_{μ}
Muon antineutrino	ν̅_{μ}
Generation 3
Tau neutrino	ν_{τ}
Tau antineutrino	ν̅_{τ}

There are three known types (flavors) of neutrinos: electron neutrino ν_{e}, muon neutrino ν_{μ}, and tau neutrino ν_{τ}, named after their partner leptons in the Standard Model (see table at right). The current best measurement of the number of neutrino types comes from observing the decay of the Z boson. This particle can decay into any light neutrino and its antineutrino, and the more available types of light neutrinos, (Note: In this context, "light neutrino" means neutrinos with less than half the mass of the Z boson.) the shorter the lifetime of the Z boson. Measurements of the Z lifetime have shown that three light neutrino flavors couple to the Z.

== Research ==
There are several active research areas involving the neutrino with aspirations of finding:

- the three neutrino mass values
- the degree of CP violation in the leptonic sector (which may lead to leptogenesis)
- evidence of physics which might break the Standard Model of particle physics, such as neutrinoless double beta decay, which would be evidence for violation of lepton number conservation.

=== Detectors near artificial neutrino sources ===
International scientific collaborations install large neutrino detectors near nuclear reactors or in neutrino beams from particle accelerators to better constrain the neutrino masses and the values for the magnitude and rates of oscillations between neutrino flavors. These experiments are thereby searching for the existence of CP violation in the neutrino sector; that is, whether or not the laws of physics treat neutrinos and antineutrinos differently.

The KATRIN experiment in Germany began to acquire data in June 2018 to determine the value of the mass of the electron neutrino, with other approaches to this problem in the planning stages.

=== Gravitational effects ===
Despite their tiny masses, neutrinos are so numerous that their gravitational force can influence other matter in the universe.

The three known neutrino flavors are the only candidates for dark matter that are experimentally established elementary particles – specifically, they would be hot dark matter. However, the currently known neutrino types seem to be essentially ruled out as a substantial proportion of dark matter, based on observations of the cosmic microwave background. It still seems plausible that heavier, sterile neutrinos might compose warm dark matter, if they exist.

=== Sterile neutrino searches ===
Other efforts search for evidence of a sterile neutrino – a fourth neutrino flavor that would not interact with matter like the three known neutrino flavors. While the measured decay width of the Z boson indicates the existence of only three active light neutrinos, sterile neutrinos do not participate in the weak interaction and are therefore not subject to this experimental constraint.

The existence of such particles is in fact hinted by experimental data from the LSND experiment. On the other hand, the currently running MiniBooNE experiment suggested that sterile neutrinos are not required to explain the experimental data, although the latest research into this area is on-going and anomalies in the MiniBooNE data may allow for exotic neutrino types, including sterile neutrinos. A re-analysis of reference electron spectra data from the Institut Laue-Langevin in 2011 has also hinted at a fourth, light sterile neutrino. Triggered by the 2011 findings, several experiments at very short distances from nuclear reactors have searched for sterile neutrinos since then. While most of them were able to rule out the existence of a light sterile neutrino, the combined results are ambiguous.

According to an analysis published in 2010, data from the Wilkinson Microwave Anisotropy Probe of the cosmic background radiation is compatible with either three or four types of neutrinos.

=== Neutrinoless double-beta decay searches ===
Another hypothesis concerns neutrinoless double-beta decay, which, if it exists, would violate lepton number conservation and show that neutrinos have a non-zero Majorana mass. Searches for this mechanism are underway but have not yet found evidence for it.

=== Cosmic ray neutrinos ===
Cosmic ray neutrino experiments detect neutrinos from space to study both the nature of neutrinos and the cosmic sources producing them.

=== Speed ===
Before neutrinos were found to oscillate, they were generally assumed to be massless, propagating at the speed of light (c). According to the theory of special relativity, the question of neutrino velocity is closely related to their mass: If neutrinos are massless, they must travel at the speed of light, and if they have mass they cannot reach the speed of light. Due to their tiny mass, the predicted speed is extremely close to the speed of light in all experiments, and current detectors are not sensitive to the expected difference.

Also, there are some Lorentz-violating variants of quantum gravity which might allow faster-than-light neutrinos. A comprehensive framework for Lorentz violations is the Standard-Model Extension (SME).

The first measurements of neutrino speed were made in the early 1980s using pulsed pion beams (produced by pulsed proton beams hitting a target). The pions decayed producing neutrinos, and the neutrino interactions observed within a time window in a detector at a distance were consistent with the speed of light. This measurement was repeated in 2007 using the MINOS detectors, which found the speed of 3 GeV neutrinos to be, at the 99% confidence level, in the range between 0.999976 c and 1.000126 c. The central value of 1.000051 c is higher than the speed of light but, with uncertainty taken into account, is also consistent with a velocity of exactly c or slightly less. This measurement set an upper bound on the mass of the muon neutrino at 50 MeV with 99% confidence. After the detectors for the project were upgraded in 2012, MINOS refined their initial result and found agreement with the speed of light, with the difference in the arrival time of neutrinos and light of −0.0006%±0.0012%.

A similar observation was made, on a much larger scale, with supernova 1987A (SN 1987A). Antineutrinos with an energy of 10 MeV from the supernova were detected within a time window that was consistent with the speed of light for the neutrinos. So far, all measurements of neutrino speed have been consistent with the speed of light.

==== Superluminal neutrino glitch ====
In September 2011, the OPERA collaboration released calculations showing velocities of 17 GeV and 28 GeV neutrinos exceeding the speed of light in their experiments. In November 2011, OPERA repeated its experiment with changes so that the speed could be determined individually for each detected neutrino. The results showed the same faster-than-light speed. In February 2012, reports came out that the results may have been caused by a loose fiber optic cable attached to one of the atomic clocks which measured the departure and arrival times of the neutrinos. An independent recreation of the experiment in the same laboratory by ICARUS found no discernible difference between the speed of a neutrino and the speed of light.

=== Mass ===
Unsolved problem in physics
Can we measure the neutrino masses? Do neutrinos follow Dirac or Majorana statistics?
More unsolved problems in physics

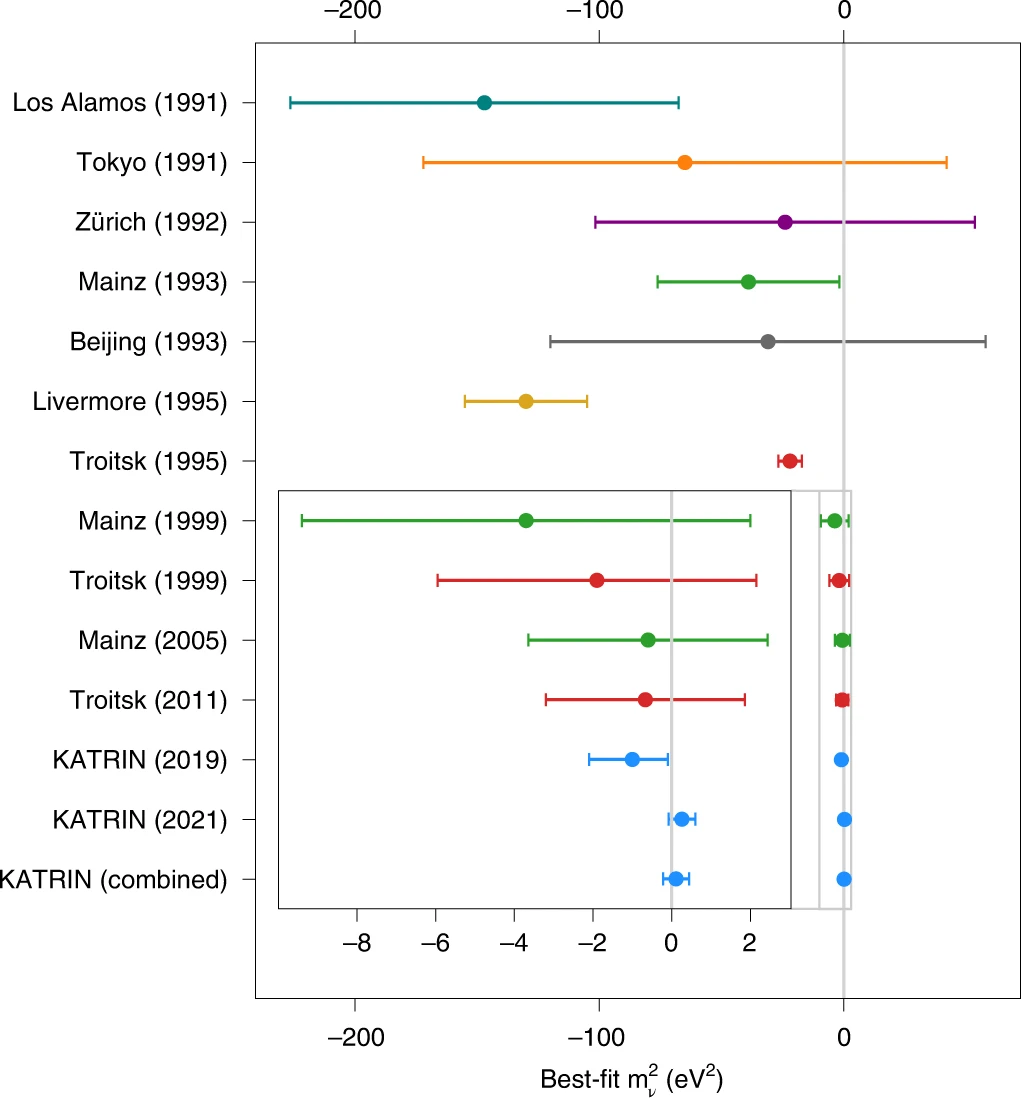
Timeline of neutrino mass measurements by different experiments

The Standard Model of particle physics assumed that neutrinos are massless. The experimentally established phenomenon of neutrino oscillation, which mixes neutrino flavor states with neutrino mass states (analogously to CKM mixing), requires neutrinos to have nonzero masses. Massive neutrinos were originally conceived by Bruno Pontecorvo in the 1950s. Enhancing the basic framework to accommodate their mass is straightforward by adding a right-handed Lagrangian.

Providing for neutrino mass can be done in two ways, and some proposals use both:

- If, like other fundamental Standard Model fermions, mass is generated by the Dirac mechanism, then the framework would require an additional right-chiral component which is an SU(2) singlet. This component would have the conventional Yukawa interactions with the neutral component of the Higgs doublet; but, otherwise, would have no interactions with Standard Model particles.
- Or, else, mass can be generated by the Majorana mechanism, which would require the neutrino and antineutrino to be the same particle.

A hard upper limit on the masses of neutrinos comes from cosmology, first derived in 1966 by Semyon Solomonovich Gershtein and Yakov Zeldovich. The Big Bang model predicts that there is a fixed ratio between the number of neutrinos and the number of photons in the cosmic microwave background. If the total mass of all three types of neutrinos exceeded an average of 60 GeV/c^{2} per neutrino, there would be so much mass in the universe that it would collapse. This limit can be circumvented by assuming that the neutrino is unstable, but there are limits within the Standard Model that make this difficult. A much more stringent constraint comes from a careful analysis of cosmological data, such as the cosmic microwave background radiation, galaxy surveys, and the Lyman-alpha forest. Analysis of data from the WMAP microwave space telescope found that the sum of the masses of the three neutrino species must be less than 0.3 eV/c^{2}. In 2018, the Planck collaboration published a stronger bound of 0.11 eV/c^{2}, which was derived by combining their CMB total intensity, polarization and gravitational lensing observations with baryon acoustic oscillation measurements from galaxy surveys and supernova measurements from Pantheon. A 2021 reanalysis that adds redshift space distortion measurements from the SDSS-IV eBOSS survey gets an even tighter upper limit of 0.09 eV/c^{2}. However, several ground-based telescopes with similarly sized error bars as Planck prefer higher values for the neutrino mass sum, indicating some tension in the data sets.

The Nobel prize in Physics 2015 was awarded to Takaaki Kajita and Arthur B. McDonald for their experimental discovery of neutrino oscillations, which demonstrates that neutrinos have mass.

In 1998, research results at the Super-Kamiokande neutrino detector determined that neutrinos can oscillate from one flavor to another, which requires that they must have a nonzero mass. While this shows that neutrinos have mass, the absolute neutrino mass scale is still not known. This is because neutrino oscillations are sensitive only to the difference in the squares of the masses. As of 2020, the best-fit value of the difference of the squares of the masses of mass eigenstates 1 and 2 is |Δm_{21}^{2}| = 0.000074 (eV/c^{2})^{2}, while for eigenstates 2 and 3 it is |Δm_{32}^{2}| = 0.00251 (eV/c^{2})^{2}. Since |Δm_{32}^{2}| is the difference of two squared masses, at least one of them must have a value that is at least the square root of this value. Thus, there exists at least one neutrino mass eigenstate with a mass of at least 0.05 eV/c^{2}.

A number of efforts are under way to directly determine the absolute neutrino mass scale in laboratory experiments, especially using nuclear beta decay. Upper limits on the effective electron neutrino masses come from beta decays of tritium. The Mainz Neutrino Mass Experiment set an upper limit of m < 2.2 eV/c^{2} at 95% confidence level. Since June 2018 the KATRIN experiment searches for a mass between 0.2 eV/c^{2} and 2 eV/c^{2} in tritium decays. An upper limit of m_{ν} < 0.45 eV/c^{2} at 90% CL was set by KATRIN from 259 days of measurement.

On 31 May 2010, OPERA researchers observed the first tau neutrino candidate event in a muon neutrino beam, the first time this transformation in neutrinos had been observed, providing further evidence that they have mass.

If the neutrino is a Majorana particle, the mass may be calculated by finding the half-life of neutrinoless double-beta decay of certain nuclei. The current lowest upper limit on the Majorana mass of the neutrino has been set by KamLAND-Zen: 0.060–0.161 eV/c^{2}.

=== Chirality ===
Experimental results show that within the margin of error, all produced and observed neutrinos have left-handed helicities (spins antiparallel to momenta), and all antineutrinos have right-handed helicities. In the massless limit, that means that only one of two possible chiralities is observed for either particle. These are the only chiralities included in the Standard Model of particle interactions.

It is possible that their counterparts (right-handed neutrinos and left-handed antineutrinos) simply do not exist. If they do exist, their properties are substantially different from observable neutrinos and antineutrinos. It is theorized that they are either very heavy (on the order of GUT scale—see Seesaw mechanism), do not participate in weak interaction (so-called sterile neutrinos), or both.

The existence of nonzero neutrino masses somewhat complicates the situation. Neutrinos are produced in weak interactions as chirality eigenstates. Chirality of a massive particle is not a constant of motion; helicity is, but the chirality operator does not share eigenstates with the helicity operator. Free neutrinos propagate as mixtures of left- and right-handed helicity states, with mixing amplitudes on the order of m_{ν}/E . This does not significantly affect the experiments, because neutrinos involved are nearly always ultrarelativistic, and thus mixing amplitudes are vanishingly small. Effectively, they travel so quickly and time passes so slowly in their rest-frames that they do not have enough time to change over any observable path. For example, most solar neutrinos have energies on the order of 0.1 MeV to 1 MeV; consequently, the fraction of neutrinos with "wrong" helicity among them cannot exceed 10^{−10}.

== Sources ==
=== Artificial ===
==== Reactor neutrinos ====
A nuclear fission reactor produces around 10^{20} electron antineutrinos per second. Fission of ^{235}U, as well as ^{238}U,^{239}Pu and ^{241}Pu produce neutron-rich daughter nuclides that rapidly undergo a series of additional beta decays, yielding about six electron antineutrino per fission. Including these subsequent decays, the average nuclear fission releases about 200 MeV of energy, of which roughly 95.5% remains in the core as heat, and roughly 4.5% (or about 9 MeV) is radiated away as antineutrinos.

The antineutrino energy spectrum depends on the degree to which the fuel is burned (plutonium-239 fission antineutrinos on average have slightly more energy than those from uranium-235 fission), but in general, the detectable antineutrinos from fission have a peak energy between about 3.5 and 4 MeV, with a maximum energy of about 10 MeV. There is no established experimental method to measure the flux of low-energy antineutrinos, though experiments to demonstrate the capacity of low-energy neutrino detection via the threshold-less CEνNS interaction are ongoing. Only antineutrinos with an energy above threshold of 1.8 MeV can trigger inverse beta decay and thus be unambiguously identified (see § Detection below).

An estimated 3% of all antineutrinos from a nuclear reactor carry an energy above that threshold. Thus, an average nuclear power plant may generate over 10^{20} antineutrinos per second above the threshold, but also a much larger number (97% / 3% ≈ 30 times this number) below the energy threshold; these lower-energy antineutrinos are invisible to present detector technology.

==== Accelerator neutrinos ====
Some particle accelerators have been used to make neutrino beams. The technique is to collide protons with a fixed target, producing charged pions or kaons. These unstable particles are then magnetically focused into a long tunnel where they decay while in flight. Because of the relativistic boost of the decaying particle, the neutrinos are produced as a beam rather than isotropically. Efforts to design an accelerator facility where neutrinos are produced through muon decays are ongoing. Such a setup is generally known as a "neutrino factory".

==== Collider neutrinos ====
Unlike other artificial sources, colliders produce both neutrinos and anti-neutrinos of all flavors at very high energies. The first direct observation of collider neutrinos was reported in 2023 by the FASER experiment at the Large Hadron Collider.

==== Nuclear weapons ====
Fred Reines and Clyde Cowan suspected that nuclear weapons produce very large quantities of neutrinos but concluded that the short timescale of the blast would make detection impossible. They instead turned to nuclear reactors as a possible source; a fission reactor was recommended as a better alternative by Los Alamos physics division leader J.M.B. Kellogg. Fission weapons produce antineutrinos (from the fission process), and fusion weapons produce both neutrinos (from the fusion process) and antineutrinos (from the initiating fission explosion).

=== Geologic ===
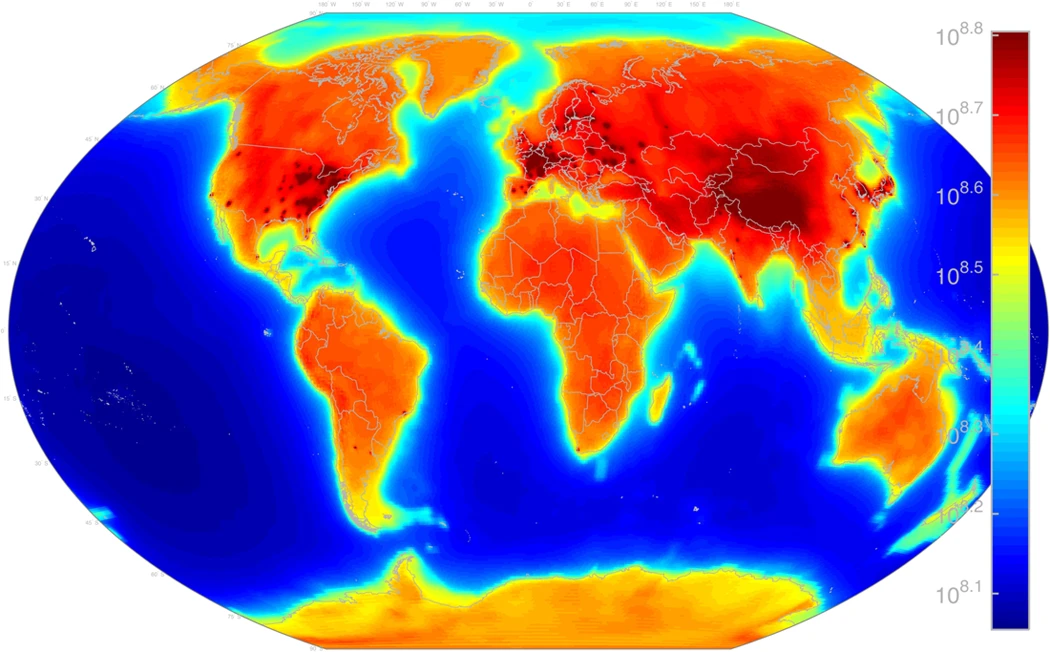
AGM2015: A worldwide v̄_{e} flux map combining geoneutrinos from natural Uranium-238 and Thorium-232 decay in the Earth's crust and mantle as well as reactor-v̄_{e} emitted by power plant reactors worldwide.

Neutrinos are produced together with the natural background radiation. In particular, the decay chains of ^{238}U and ^{232}Th isotopes, as well as ^{40}K, include beta decays which emit antineutrinos. These so-called geoneutrinos can provide valuable information on the Earth's interior. A first indication for geoneutrinos was found by the KamLAND experiment in 2005, updated results have been presented by KamLAND, and Borexino. The main background in the geoneutrino measurements are the antineutrinos coming from reactors.

Solar neutrinos (proton–proton chain) in the Standard Solar Model

=== Atmospheric ===
Atmospheric neutrinos result from the interaction of cosmic rays with atomic nuclei in the Earth's atmosphere, creating showers of particles, many of which are unstable and produce neutrinos when they decay. A collaboration of particle physicists from Tata Institute of Fundamental Research (India), Osaka City University (Japan) and Durham University (UK) recorded the first cosmic ray neutrino interaction in an underground laboratory in Kolar Gold Fields in India in 1965.

=== Solar ===
Solar neutrinos originate from nuclear fusion powering the Sun. In the primary nuclear reaction, four protons fuse to become one helium nucleus, two positrons and two electron neutrinos.

The Sun sends enormous numbers of neutrinos in all directions. Each second, about 65 billion (6.5×10^{10}) solar neutrinos pass through every square centimeter on the part of the Earth orthogonal to the direction of the Sun. Since neutrinos are insignificantly absorbed by the mass of the Earth, the surface area on the side of the Earth opposite the Sun receives about the same number of neutrinos as the side facing the Sun.

=== Supernovae ===
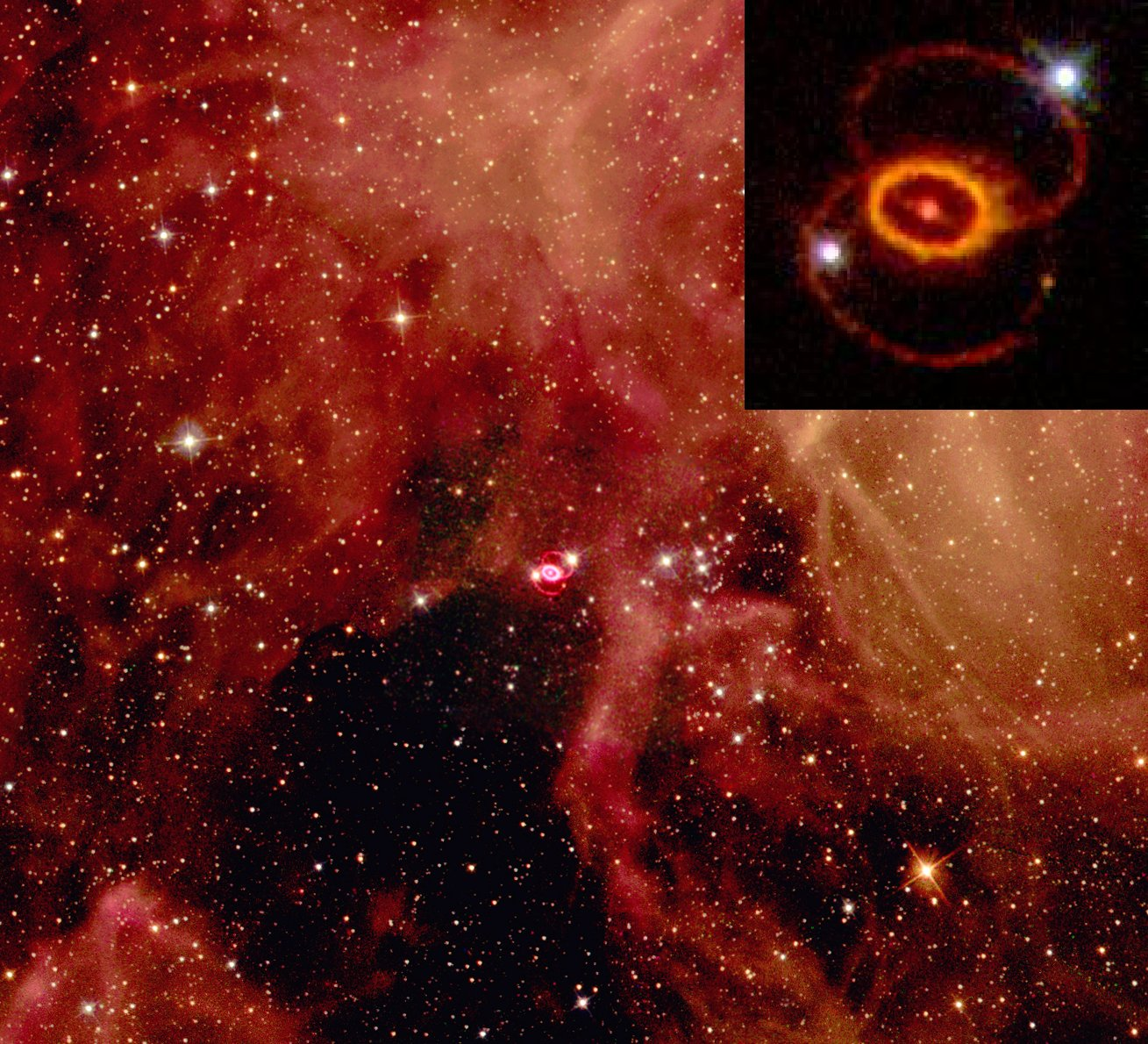
SN 1987A

Colgate & White (1966) calculated that neutrinos carry away most of the gravitational energy released during the collapse of massive stars, events now categorized as Type Ib and Ic and Type II supernovae. When such stars collapse, matter densities at the core become so high (10^{17} kg/m^{3}) that the degeneracy of electrons is not enough to prevent protons and electrons from combining to form a neutron and an electron neutrino. Mann (1997) found a second and more profuse neutrino source is the thermal energy (100 billion kelvins) of the newly formed neutron core, which is dissipated via the formation of neutrino–antineutrino pairs of all flavors.

Colgate and White's theory of supernova neutrino production was confirmed in 1987, when neutrinos from Supernova 1987A were detected. The water-based detectors Kamiokande II and IMB detected 11 and 8 antineutrinos (lepton number = −1) of thermal origin, respectively, while the scintillator-based Baksan detector found 5 neutrinos (lepton number = +1) of either thermal or electron-capture origin, in a burst less than 13 seconds long. The neutrino signal from the supernova arrived at Earth several hours before the arrival of the first electromagnetic radiation, as expected from the evident fact that the latter emerges along with the shock wave. The exceptionally feeble interaction with normal matter allowed the neutrinos to pass through the churning mass of the exploding star, while the electromagnetic photons were slowed.

Because neutrinos interact so little with matter, it is thought that a supernova's neutrino emissions carry information about the innermost regions of the explosion. Much of the visible light comes from the decay of radioactive elements produced by the supernova shock wave, and even light from the explosion itself is scattered by dense and turbulent gases, and thus delayed. The neutrino burst is expected to reach Earth before any electromagnetic waves, including visible light, gamma rays, or radio waves. The exact time delay of the electromagnetic waves' arrivals depends on the velocity of the shock wave and on the thickness of the outer layer of the star. For a Type II supernova, astronomers expect the neutrino flood to be released seconds after the stellar core collapse, while the first electromagnetic signal may emerge hours later, after the explosion shock wave has had time to reach the surface of the star. The SuperNova Early Warning System project uses a network of neutrino detectors to monitor the sky for candidate supernova events; the neutrino signal will provide a useful advance warning of a star exploding in the Milky Way.

Although neutrinos pass through the outer gases of a supernova without scattering, they provide information about the deeper supernova core with evidence that here, even neutrinos scatter to a significant extent. In a supernova core the densities are those of a neutron star (which is expected to be formed in this type of supernova), becoming large enough to influence the duration of the neutrino signal by delaying some neutrinos. The 13-second-long neutrino signal from SN 1987A lasted far longer than it would take for unimpeded neutrinos to cross through the neutrino-generating core of a supernova, expected to be only 3,200 kilometers in diameter for SN 1987A.

The number of neutrinos counted was also consistent with a total neutrino energy of 2.2×10^{46} joules, which was estimated to be nearly all of the total energy of the supernova.

For an average supernova, approximately 10^{57} (an octodecillion) neutrinos are released, but the actual number detected at a terrestrial detector $N$ will be far smaller, at the level of
$$N \sim 10^4 \left(\frac{M}{25 \,\mathsf{kton}}\right) \left(\frac{10 \,\mathsf{kpc}}{d}\right)^2,$$
where $M$ is the mass of the detector (with e.g. Super Kamiokande having a mass of 50 kton) and $d$ is the distance to the supernova. Hence in practice it will only be possible to detect neutrino bursts from supernovae within or nearby the Milky Way (our own galaxy). In addition to the detection of neutrinos from individual supernovae, it should also be possible to detect the diffuse supernova neutrino background, which originates from all supernovae in the Universe.

=== Supernova remnants ===
The energy of supernova neutrinos ranges from a few to several tens of MeV. The sites where cosmic rays are accelerated are expected to produce neutrinos that are at least one million times more energetic, produced from turbulent gaseous environments left over by supernova explosions: Supernova remnants. The origin of the cosmic rays was attributed to supernovas by Baade and Zwicky; this hypothesis was refined by Ginzburg and Syrovatsky who attributed the origin to supernova remnants, and supported their claim by the crucial remark, that the cosmic ray losses of the Milky Way is compensated, if the efficiency of acceleration in supernova remnants is about 10 percent. Ginzburg and Syrovatskii's hypothesis is supported by the specific mechanism of "shock wave acceleration" happening in supernova remnants, which is consistent with the original theoretical picture drawn by Enrico Fermi, and is receiving support from observational data. The very high-energy neutrinos are still to be seen, but this branch of neutrino astronomy is just in its infancy. The main existing or forthcoming experiments that aim at observing very-high-energy neutrinos from our galaxy are Baikal, AMANDA, IceCube, ANTARES, NEMO and Nestor. Related information is provided by very-high-energy gamma ray observatories, such as VERITAS, HESS and MAGIC. Indeed, the collisions of cosmic rays are supposed to produce charged pions, whose decay give the neutrinos, neutral pions, and gamma rays the environment of a supernova remnant, which is transparent to both types of radiation.

Still-higher-energy neutrinos, resulting from the interactions of extragalactic cosmic rays, could be observed with the Pierre Auger Observatory or with the dedicated experiment named ANITA.

=== Big Bang ===
It is thought that, just like the cosmic microwave background radiation leftover from the Big Bang, there is a background of low-energy neutrinos in our Universe. In the 1980s it was proposed that these may be the explanation for the dark matter thought to exist in the universe. Neutrinos have one important advantage over most other dark matter candidates: They are known to exist. This idea also has serious problems.

From particle experiments, it is known that neutrinos are very light. This means that they easily move at speeds close to the speed of light. For this reason, dark matter made from neutrinos is termed "hot dark matter". The problem is that being fast moving, the neutrinos would tend to have spread out evenly in the universe before cosmological expansion made them cold enough to congregate in clumps. This would cause the part of dark matter made of neutrinos to be smeared out and unable to cause the large galactic structures that we see.

These same galaxies and groups of galaxies appear to be surrounded by dark matter that is not fast enough to escape from those galaxies. Presumably this matter provided the gravitational nucleus for formation. This implies that neutrinos cannot make up a significant part of the total amount of dark matter.

From cosmological arguments, relic background neutrinos are estimated to have density of 56 of each type per cubic centimeter and temperature 1.9 K (1.7×10^{−4} eV) if they are massless, much colder if their mass exceeds 0.001 eV/c^{2}. Although their density is quite high, they have not yet been observed in the laboratory, as their energy is below thresholds of most detection methods, and due to extremely low neutrino interaction cross-sections at sub-eV energies. In contrast, boron-8 solar neutrinos—which are emitted with a higher energy—have been detected definitively despite having a space density that is lower than that of relic neutrinos by some six orders of magnitude.

== Detection ==
Neutrinos are extremely difficult to detect directly, as they do not carry electric charge, which means they do not ionize the materials they pass through. They however carry a Weak charge, and can therefore interact with matter through the Weak interaction, in both charged and neutral current forms. However, given its short range and weak coupling, such interactions are exceedingly rare.

Antineutrinos were first detected in the 1950s near a nuclear reactor. Reines and Cowan used two giant tanks of scintillator solution, one loaded with cadmium octoate to detect the neutrino from the reaction

p + ν̅_{e} → n + e^{+}.

The tank with cadmium would produce two signals for a neutrino detection, one from positron and one from the neutron. Both signals at the same time, combined with no signal from the second tank, was considered one neutrino. Counts in both tanks at the same time was considered a cosmic ray event. They measured about 36 valid neutrino events per hour.

Antineutrinos with an energy above the threshold of 1.8 MeV caused charged current interactions with the protons in the water, an interaction usually known as inverse beta decay, producing positrons and neutrons. This is very much like β^{+} decay, where energy is used to convert a proton into a neutron, a positron (e^{+}) and an electron neutrino (ν_{e}) is emitted:

Energy + p → n + e^{+} + ν_{e}

In the Cowan and Reines experiment, instead of an outgoing neutrino, an incoming antineutrino (ν̅_{e}) from a nuclear reactor interacts with a proton:

Energy (> 1.8 MeV) + p + ν̅_{e} → n + e^{+}

The resulting positron annihilation with electrons in the detector material created photons with an energy of about 0.5 MeV. Pairs of photons in coincidence could be detected by the two scintillation detectors above and below the target. The neutrons were captured by cadmium nuclei resulting in gamma rays of about 8 MeV that were detected a few microseconds after the photons from a positron annihilation event.

Since then, various detection methods have been used. Super Kamiokande is a large volume of water surrounded by photomultiplier tubes that watch for the Cherenkov radiation emitted when an incoming neutrino creates an electron or muon in the water. The Sudbury Neutrino Observatory is similar, but used heavy water as the detecting medium, which uses the same effects, but also allows the additional reaction any-flavor neutrino photo-dissociation of deuterium, resulting in a free neutron which is then detected from gamma radiation after chlorine-capture. Other detectors, such as the one used in the Homestake Experiment, have consisted of large volumes of chlorine or gallium which are periodically checked for excesses of argon or germanium, respectively, which are created by electron-neutrinos interacting with the original substance. MINOS used a solid plastic scintillator coupled to photomultiplier tubes, while Borexino uses a liquid pseudocumene scintillator also watched by photomultiplier tubes and the NOνA detector uses liquid scintillator watched by avalanche photodiodes. The IceCube Neutrino Observatory uses 1 km^{3} of the Antarctic ice sheet near the South Pole with photomultiplier tubes distributed throughout the volume. Another modern detection method is The Liquid Argon Time Projection Chamber (LArTPC), which consists of a large volume of liquid argon with a high voltage field applied to drift the ionized electrons to a series of charge collection planes, allowing for 3D reconstruction of particle tracks. Several experiments have used this technology, including MicroBooNE, the Short-Baseline Near Detector, and the upcoming Deep Underground Neutrino Experiment.

Diagram of coherent elastic neutrino-nucleus scattering

More exotically, some experiments (such as COHERENT and CONUS) leverage the neutral current interaction of neutrinos with a whole nucleus, the Coherent elastic neutrino-nucleus scattering (CEνNS) interaction, to detect neutrinos below the threshold of inverse beta decay. These experiments, which overwhelmingly use crystal-based detectors very similar to the solid-state detectors in use for direct detection of dark matter experiments, are some of the most sensitive particle detectors in modern physics, boasting thresholds as low as 20 eV deposited in the detector. This is necessary as the heavier nuclei, selected for the high probability of interaction, will retain very little of the energy in an elastic scattering, being much more massive than the neutrino.

Other ways neutrinos might affect their environment, such as the MSW effect, do not produce traceable radiation, and are not predicted to be detectable.

== Scientific interest ==
Neutrinos' low mass and neutral charge mean they interact exceedingly weakly with other particles and fields. This feature of weak interaction interests scientists because it means neutrinos can be used to probe environments that other radiation (such as light or radio waves) cannot penetrate.

Using neutrinos as a probe was first proposed in the mid-20th century as a way to detect conditions at the core of the Sun. The solar core cannot be imaged directly because electromagnetic radiation (such as light) is diffused by the great amount and density of matter surrounding the core. On the other hand, neutrinos pass through the Sun with few interactions. Whereas photons emitted from the solar core may require 40000 years to diffuse to the outer layers of the Sun, neutrinos generated in stellar fusion reactions at the core cross this distance practically unimpeded at nearly the speed of light.

Neutrinos are also useful for probing astrophysical sources beyond the Solar System because they are the only known particles that are not significantly attenuated by their travel through the interstellar medium. Optical photons can be obscured or diffused by dust, gas, and background radiation. High-energy cosmic rays, in the form of swift protons and atomic nuclei, are unable to travel more than about 100 megaparsecs due to the Greisen–Zatsepin–Kuzmin limit (GZK cutoff). Neutrinos, in contrast, can travel even greater distances barely attenuated.

The galactic core of the Milky Way is fully obscured by dense gas and numerous bright objects. Neutrinos produced in the galactic core might be measurable by Earth-based neutrino telescopes.

Another important use of the neutrino is in the observation of supernovae, the explosions that end the lives of highly massive stars. The core collapse phase of a supernova is an extremely dense and energetic event. It is so dense that no known particles are able to escape the advancing core front except for neutrinos. Consequently, supernovae are known to release approximately 99% of their radiant energy in a short (10-second) burst of neutrinos. These neutrinos are a very useful probe for core collapse studies.

The rest mass of the neutrino is an important test of cosmological and astrophysical theories. The neutrino's significance in probing cosmological phenomena is as great as any other method, and is thus a major focus of study in astrophysical communities.

The study of neutrinos is important in particle physics because neutrinos typically have the lowest rest mass among massive particles (i.e. the lowest non-zero rest mass, i.e. excluding the zero rest mass of photons and gluons), and hence are examples of the lowest-energy massive particles theorized in extensions of the Standard Model of particle physics.

In November 2012, American scientists used a particle accelerator to send a coherent neutrino message through 780 feet of rock. This marks the first use of neutrinos for communication, and future research may permit binary neutrino messages to be sent immense distances through even the densest materials, such as the Earth's core.

In July 2018, the IceCube Neutrino Observatory announced that they have traced an extremely-high-energy neutrino that hit their Antarctica-based research station in September 2017 back to its point of origin in the blazar TXS 0506+056 located 3.7 billion light-years away in the direction of the constellation Orion. This is the first time that a neutrino detector has been used to locate an object in space and that a source of cosmic rays has been identified.

In November 2022, the IceCube Neutrino Observatory found evidence of high-energy neutrino emission from NGC 1068, also known as Messier 77, an active galaxy in the constellation Cetus and one of the most familiar and well-studied galaxies to date.

In June 2023, astronomers reported using a new technique to detect, for the first time, the release of neutrinos from the galactic plane of the Milky Way galaxy.

== See also ==
- List of neutrino experiments
- Multi-messenger astronomy – Coordination of related astronomical observations
- Neutrino oscillation – Phenomenon in which a neutrino changes lepton flavor as it travels
- Neutrino astronomy – Observing low-mass stellar particles
- Pontecorvo–Maki–Nakagawa–Sakata matrix – Model of neutrino oscillation
