= Coherent elastic neutrino-nucleus scattering =

Nuclear reaction between a neutrino and an atomic nucleus

In nuclear and particle physics, coherent elastic neutrino-nucleus scattering, commonly abbreviated to CEvNS (pronounced /ˈsɛvəns/ like "seven-s"), is a nuclear reaction involving neutrinos of any active flavor scattering off nuclei. In contrast to inverse beta decay, the process only results in a nuclear recoil because the initial and final states must be identical. This process is used in the detection of low-energy neutrinos in neutrino experiments, such as with the first detection by the COHERENT Collaboration, the first measurement of CEvNS using neutrinos from a nuclear reactor with the CONUS+ detector, or the measurement of solar neutrinos with the PandaX and XENON-nT dark matter detectors. It has the highest cross-section for low-energy neutrinos, and has no energy threshold, thus making it an important process for the detection of low energy neutrinos (< 60 MeV). Observations of it provide an essential test of the Standard Model.

== Reaction ==
Diagram of coherent elastic neutrino-nucleus scattering

The differential cross-section for CEvNS with respect to the recoil energy is approximated by:

$\frac{d\sigma}{dT} = \frac{G_F^2 M}{2\pi} \cdot \frac{Q_W^2}{4} \, F^2(Q) \left(2 - \frac{MT}{E_\nu^2} \right)$

where: $G_F$ is the Fermi coupling constant, $M$ is the mass of the target nucleus, $Q_W$ is the weak nuclear charge, $F(Q)$ is the ground state elastic nuclear form factor as a function of momentum transfer $Q$, $T$ is the recoil energy of the nucleus, and $E_\nu$ is the energy of the incoming neutrino.

This form of the cross section makes the assumption that the target nucleus has an even number of neutrons and protons, in order to avoid small corrections from weak axial currents. Under the further assumption that the calculation is only taken at tree-level, the weak charge can also be expressed as

$Q_W=Q_p Z + Q_n N = N - Z(1 - 4\sin^2\theta_W)$ in terms of the proton and neutron weak charges or the weak mixing angle $\theta_W$. Given $\sin^2\theta_W \approx 0.25$, the cross-section is approximately proportional to the square of the number of neutrons ($N^2$).

Finally, a kinematic assumption is made, where $T \ll E_{\nu}$, where $T_{max}\sim \frac{2E_{\nu}^2}{M}$.

The differential cross section with respect to the recoil angle is approximated by:

$\frac{d\sigma}{d\cos \theta} = \frac{G_F^2}{8\pi}\left( Z(4\sin^2 \theta_W - 1) + N\right)^2E^2(1-\cos \theta)$

where $\theta$ is the forward scattering angle of the nuclear recoil.

The full tree level expression is given by: $\frac{d\sigma}{dT} = \frac{G_F^2 M}{2\pi} \left[ (G_V + G_A)^2 + (G_V - G_A)^2 \left(1 - \frac{T}{E_\nu} \right)^2 - (G_V^2 - G_A^2) \frac{MT}{E_\nu^2} \right]$

Where the full expression for the maximum recoil energy can be seen to be $T_{max} = \frac{2 E_\nu^2}{M + 2E_\nu}$.

The vector and axial coupling constants are, in full generality, given by

$G_V = g_V^p Z F_P^V(Q^2) + g_V^n N F_N^V(Q^2)$ and $G_A = g_A^p (Z_+ - Z_-)F_P^A(Q^2) + g_A^n (N_+ - N_-) F_N^A(Q^2)$ respectively.

Where $g_V^p$ is the vector coupling constant of the proton, $g_A^p$ is the axial vector coupling constant of the proton, $g_V^n$ is the vector coupling constant of the neutron, $g_A^n$ is the axial vector coupling constant of the neutron, and the $F(Q^2)$ are the vector and axial vector form factors of the nucleon.

This cross section form also assumes that the contributions from weak magnetism, the strange quark contributions to the nuclear spin, the strange quark radius, and the effective neutrino charge radius area all negligible. Furthermore, it neglects the contribution to low-energy recoils from incoherent neutrino-nuclear scattering.

== Proposal ==
Following the discovery of weak neutral currents in 1973, Freedman proposed a process analogous to coherent electromagnetic scattering of photons off of atoms involving neutrinos scattering coherently off of nuclei. This process, whose suggestion was described by Freedman as "an act of hubris", went unobserved for nearly forty years.

It was immediately realized by Wilson that CEvNS could be responsible for re-invigorating the iron-layer shock front of a core-collapse neutron star.

Our suggestion may be an act of hubris, because the inevitable constraints of interaction rate, resolution, and background pose grave experimental difficulties for elastic neutrino-nucleus scattering.

— Daniel Z. Freedman

== Detection ==
Forty-three years after its prediction, the process was first detected in 2017 by the COHERENT Collaboration using a low-background CsI[Na] scintillator located at the Spallation Neutron Source in Oak Ridge National Laboratory.

This was followed by the first observation of CEvNS in a liquid argon detector by the COHERENT collaboration in 2019, and the first observation of CEvNS on germanium in 2023.

In 2024 the PandaX and XENON-nT WIMP dark matter experiments first observed the CEvNS process from solar neutrinos in liquid xenon detectors.

In 2025, the CONUS+ collaboration first detected CEvNS from reactor anti-neutrinos on germanium semiconductor detectors.

== Scientific interest ==
CEvNS is cleanly predicted in the standard model of particle physics and thus provides a test of new physics. Searches and measurements of CEvNS have provided such tests as: the existence of exotic electromagnetic properties of the neutrino, the existence of non-standard neutrino interactions and the existence of new mediators. CEvNS can also play a role in testing sterile neutrino hypotheses.

Taken another way, under assumptions of the standard model, CEvNS can play a role in probing the nuclear physics encoded in the nuclear form factors of the cross-section. In particular, information about the distribution of neutrons such as the neutron skin-depth of the nucleus, which are hard to extract from electromagnetic scattering processes, can be probed with CEvNS.

Since CEvNS is a threshold-less elastic scattering process, it has been proposed as a way to observe neutrinos from nuclear reactors below the 1.8 MeV threshold of inverse beta decay. As a result, it has potential applications in nuclear non-proliferation and nuclear reactor safeguards.

CEvNS also plays a role in supernova dynamics and its measurement in terrestrial experiments can inform modeling of the death of stars.

Finally, CEvNS from solar and astrophysical neutrino sources is an irreducible background for direct detection WIMP dark matter experiments and its precise measurement in terrestrial experiments informs the sensitivity of these experiments.
