= KATRIN =

Experiment for measuring antineutrino mass

Coordinates: 49°05′45″N 8°26′10″E

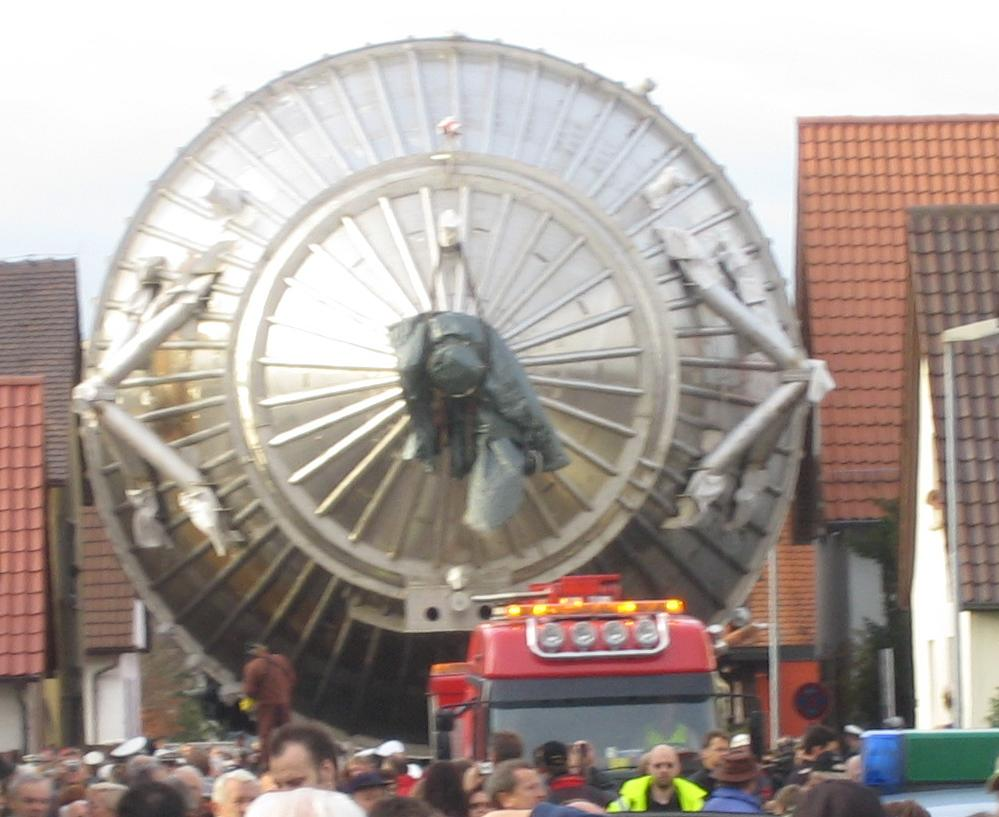
Transport of the main spectrometer to the Karlsruhe Institute of Technology.

KATRIN is a German acronym (Karlsruhe Tritium Neutrino Experiment) for an undertaking to measure the mass of the electron antineutrino with sub-eV precision by examining the spectrum of electrons emitted from the beta decay of tritium. The experiment is a recognized CERN experiment (RE14). The core of the apparatus is a 200-ton spectrometer.

In 2015, the commissioning measurements on this spectrometer were completed, successfully verifying its basic vacuum, transmission and background properties. The experiment began running tests in October 2016. The inauguration took place 11 June 2018, with the first tritium measurements by the experiment (the so-called First Tritium or FT 2-week engineering run in mid-2018). The projected experiment duration at the time was 5 years. The first science measurements (so-called first campaign) took place 10 April 2019.

In February 2022, the experiment announced an upper limit of m_{ν} < 0.8 eV c^{–2} at 90% confidence level. In April 2025 this result was improved to m_{ν} < 0.45 eV c^{–2} at the same confidence level.

== Construction and assembly ==
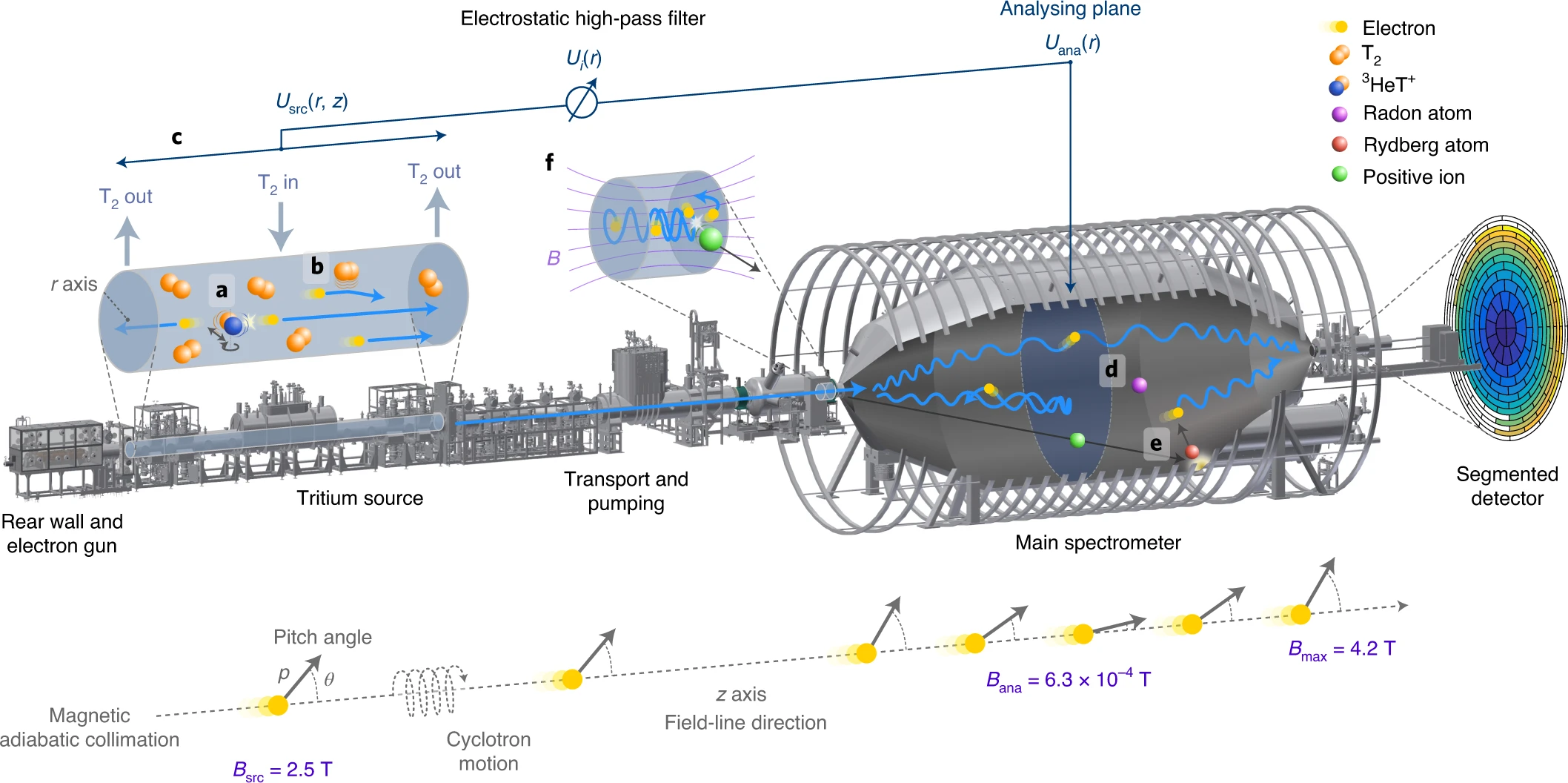
Illustration of KATRIN beamline and its main components.

The spectrometer was built by MAN DWE GmbH in Deggendorf. Although only 350 km from Karlsruhe, the tank's size made land transport impossible. Instead, it was shipped in autumn 2006 by water, down the Danube to the Black Sea, through the Mediterranean Sea and Atlantic Ocean to Rotterdam, then up the Rhine to Karlsruhe. This 8600 km long detour limited land travel to only the final 7 km from the Leopoldshafen docks to the laboratory.

The construction proceeded well with several of the major components on-site by 2010. The main spectrometer test program was scheduled for 2013 and the complete system integration for 2014. The experiment is located at the former Forschungszentrum Karlsruhe, now Campus Nord of the Karlsruhe Institute of Technology.

== Experiment ==
Energy spectrum of the electrons emitted in tritium beta decay. Three graphs for different neutrino masses are shown. These graphs differ only in the range near the high-energetic end-point; the intersection with the abscissa depends on the neutrino mass. In the KATRIN experiment the spectrum around this end-point is measured with high precision to obtain the neutrino mass.

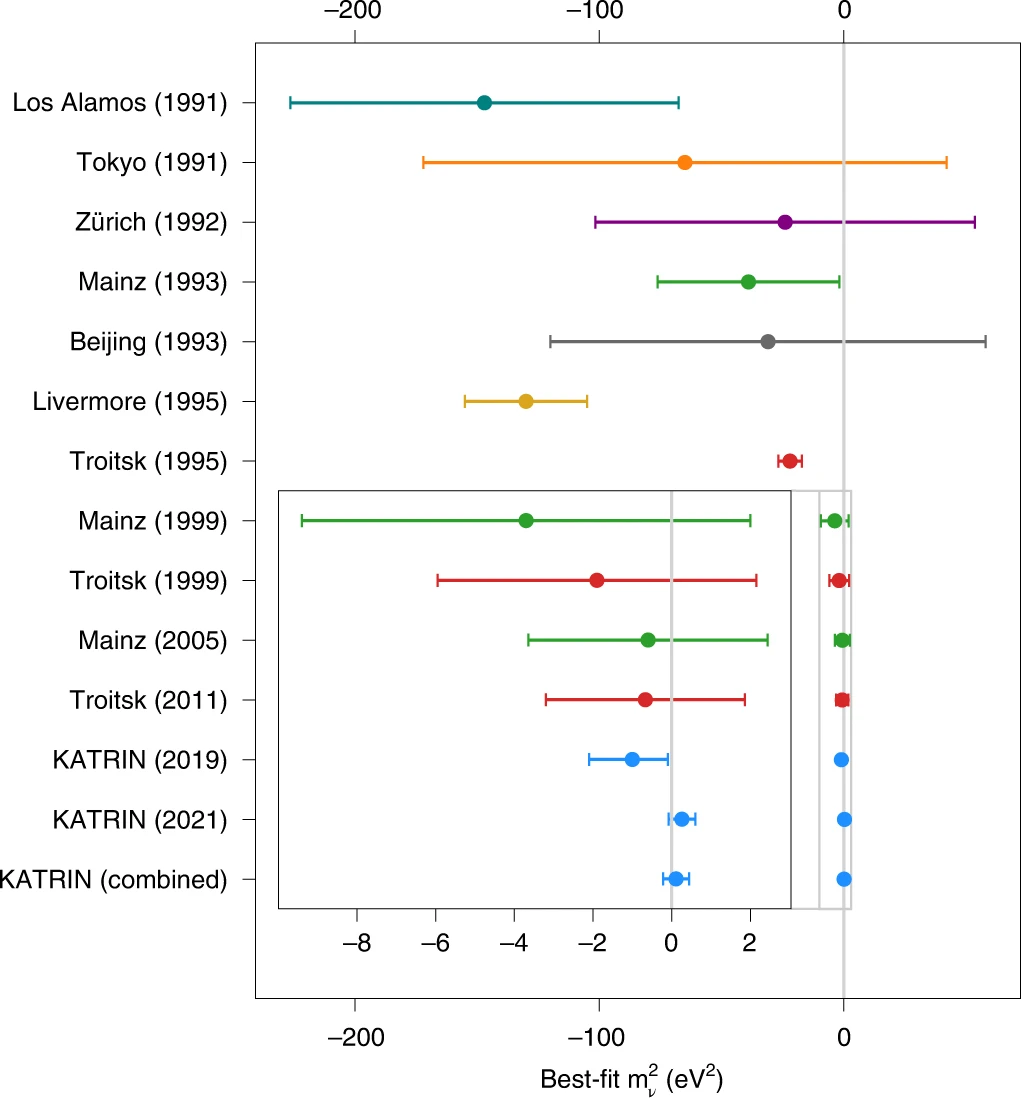
Timeline of neutrino mass measurements by different experiments.

The beta decay of tritium is one of the least energetic beta decays. The electron and the neutrino which are emitted share only 18.6 keV of energy between them. KATRIN is designed to produce a very accurate spectrum of the numbers of electrons emitted with energies very close to this total energy (only a few eV away), which correspond to very low energy neutrinos. If the neutrino is a massless particle, there is no lower bound to the energy the neutrino can carry, so the electron energy spectrum should extend all the way to the 18.6 keV limit. On the other hand, if the neutrino has mass, then it must always carry away at least the amount of energy equivalent to its mass by E = m c ², and the electron spectrum should drop off short of the total energy limit and have a different shape.

In most beta decay events, the electron and the neutrino carry away roughly equal amounts of energy. The events of interest to KATRIN, in which the electron takes almost all the energy and the neutrino almost none, are very rare, occurring roughly once in a trillion decays. In order to filter out the common events so the detector is not overwhelmed, the electrons must pass through an electric potential that stops all electrons below a certain threshold, which is set a few eV below the total energy limit. Only electrons that have enough energy to pass through the potential are counted.

=== Results ===
First results from the first measurement campaign (10 April – 13 May 2019) were published 13 September 2019. They put the upper bound of electron neutrino mass to 1.1 eV.

As of September 2019, the experiment hopes to achieve 3 measuring campaigns, each comprising 65 days of active measurement, in a year. The experiment reckons it needs 1000 days of measurement to reach target sensitivity of 0.2 eV (upper limit for neutrino mass). Thus the final results are expected in 5–6 years.

The February 2022 upper limit is m_{ν} < 0.8 eV c^{–2} at 90% CL in combination with the previous campaign.

In April 2025, this result was improved to m_{ν} < 0.45 eV c^{–2} at the same confidence level (using the 2019–2021 dataset).

== Importance ==
The precise mass of the neutrino is important not only for particle physics, but also for cosmology. The observation of neutrino oscillation is strong evidence in favor of massive neutrinos, but gives only a weak lower bound.

Along with the possible observation of neutrinoless double beta decay, KATRIN is one of the neutrino experiments most likely to yield significant results in the near future.
