= Coherent Collaboration =

Accelerator neutrino experiment in the US

Coordinates: 35.95298°N 84.30001°W

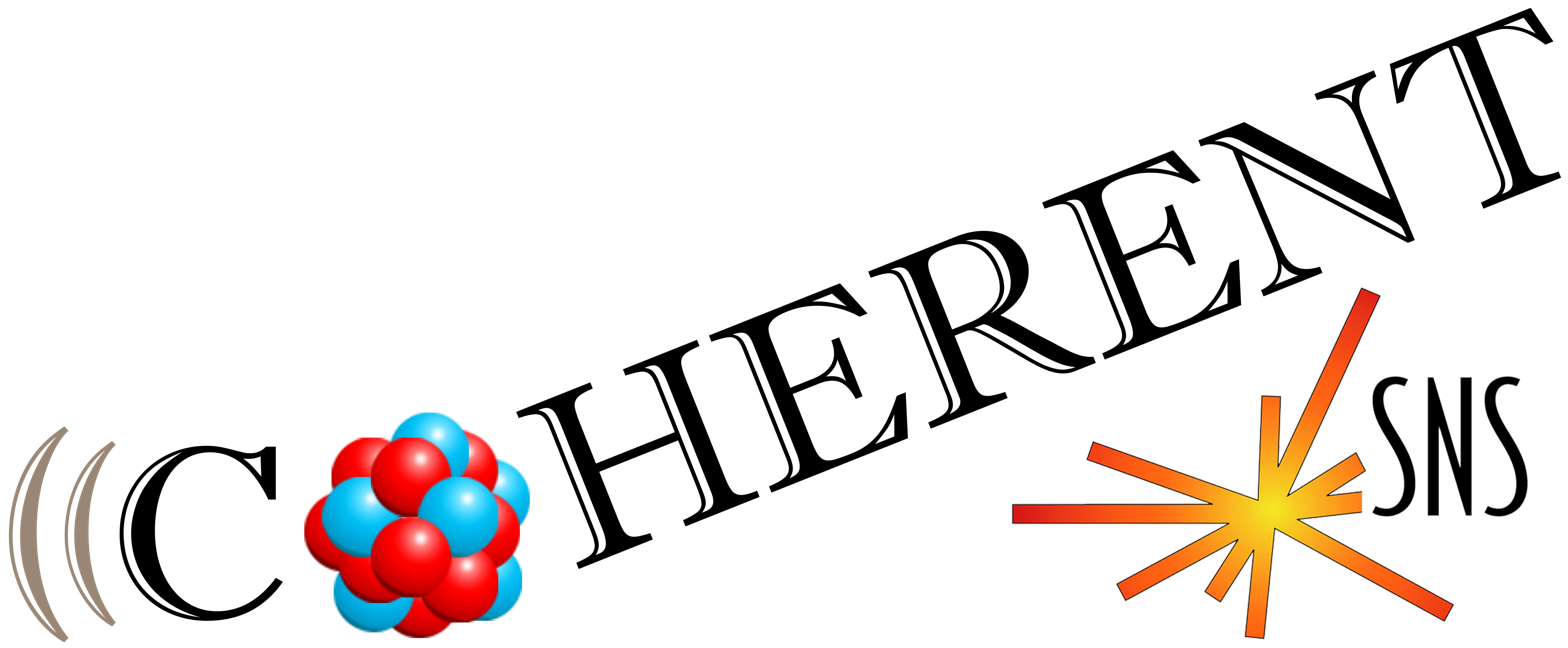
Coherent collaboration logo

The Coherent Collaboration (stylized as COHERENT Collaboration) is a multi-institutional effort to measure Coherent Elastic Neutrino-Nucleus Scattering (CEvNS) using the Spallation Neutron Source (SNS) at Oak Ridge National Lab in Oak Ridge, Tennessee. The Coherent collaboration has deployed a suite of detectors with different detector technologies and target nuclei with the goal of directly measuring CEvNS, and this was accomplished in 2017 with a CsI[Na] scintillator crystal detector, making them the first in the world to do so. By taking measurements of the CEvNS cross section for various target nuclei, the Coherent collaboration is able to provide a strong test of the predictions of the standard model. There are also opportunities to study various Beyond the Standard Model (BSM) effects, such as dark matter and sterile neutrinos.

== Physics ==
Diagram of coherent elastic neutrino-nucleus scattering

The main goal of the Coherent collaboration was to observe Coherent Elastic Neutrino-Nucleus Scattering (CEvNS, pronounced /ˈsɛvəns/ like "seven-s"), which is a nuclear reaction involving low energy neutrinos scattering off nuclei. These nuclei experience a nuclear recoil and will then deposit some of its energy into the detector medium through ionization or excitation. This process was predicted by Daniel Z. Freedman in 1974, and was only directly observed for the first time by the Coherent collaboration in 2017. CEvNS has since been observed (to 3.7σ) from a nuclear reactor source with the CONUS experiment.

CEvNS is well defined in the Standard Model, allowing theoretical predictions to be compared directly with experimental measurements to test the model's validity. The differential cross section predicted from the Standard Model shows a dominant dependence on the number of neutrons in the target nucleus, so by measuring cross sections for a range of target materials (such as argon, germanium, sodium, cesium, and iodine) and comparing them with the corresponding theoretical calculations for that nucleus, any significant deviation from the predicted behavior would indicate the presence of physics beyond the Standard Model.

The Coherent collaboration is sensitive to various BSM effects, and exploring these theories is another primary goal. Dark matter is one such effect being studied, including accelerator-produced dark matter, sub-GeV leptophobic dark matter models, and weakly interacting massive particles, which are expected to coherently scatter with nuclei like a CEvNS event. The Liquid Scinitillator Neutrino Detector and MiniBooNE experiments reported results that hinted at a fourth non-interacting neutrino called the sterile neutrino, and the Coherent collaboration would be sensitive to such a particle. The inelastic neutrino-nucleus interactions of various nuclei are also of special interest to several causes. For example, the HALO experiment monitors the neutrino flux of supernovae by measuring neutrino-induced neutrons emitted in lead, so the Coherent collaboration has deployed a detector for measuring the cross section of this effect. Measuring the inelastic neutrino interactions of the $^{127}\text{I}$ nucleus is also of special interest to neutrinoless double beta decay (0νββ) experiments for background reduction. The Coherent collaboration has also deployed several liquid argon detectors to provide measurements of inelastic neutrino interactions of the argon nucleus, which is of special interest for studying solar-neutrino oscillations as well as the low-energy physics program for the Deep Underground Neutrino Experiment.

== Design ==
Unlike a typical experiment which revolves around a single detector, the Coherent collaboration utilizes a series of smaller detector subsystems that rely on different target nuclei and different detector technologies, all working to observe and measure CEvNS. These detectors are located in what is known as "neutrino alley" at the SNS, which is a pion-decay-at-rest neutrino source providing a steady flux of neutrinos in the tens-of-MeV range.

Below is a table outlining the various detector subsystems used for measurements of CEvNS, including details such as target nuclei, detector technology, target mass, distance from source, and deployment period (either includes range of operation or start date if still active):

Target Nuclei	Detector Technology	Target Mass (kg)	Deployment Period
CsI[Na]	Doped scintillating crystal with PMT light readout	15	2015-2019
Ar	Single-phase liquid argon with PMT light readout	24	2016-2021
Ge	HPGe p-type point-contact	18	2022
NaI[Tl]	Doped scintillating crystal with PMT light readout	3500	2022
Ar	Single-phase liquid argon with PMT light readout	750	2025
Ge	HPGe p-type point-contact	50	2025
CsI	Undoped Scintillating crystal with SiPM light readout	10-15	2025

Along with studying CEvNS, the Coherent collaboration has deployed a series of other detectors with physics goals besides studying CEvNS. Below is a table outlining these various detector subsystems and details describing their operation, such as detector name, detector technology, primary physics goal, and deployment period (either includes range of operation or start date if still active):

Detector Name	Detector Technology	Primary Physics Goal	Deployment Period
NaI Neutrino Experiment (NaIνE)	NaI[Tl] scintillator crystals with PMT light readout of $^{127}\text{I}$ target	Measure the inclusive electron-neutrino charged-current cross section on $^{127}\text{I}$	2016
Multiplicity and Recoil Spectrometer (MARS)	Plastic scintillator layers with interlinked gadolinium coated Mylar sheet and PMT light readout	Monitor and characterize the beam-related neutron background	2017
Neutrino-Induced-Neutron (NIN)	Liquid scintillator detectors with PMT light readout inside lead target	Study neutrino-induced-neutrons from lead	2015-2024
$\text{D}_2\text{O}$	Heavy water Cherenkov detector with PMT light readout	Measure the absolute neutrino flux	2022
LArTPC	Liquid Argon Time Projection Chamber (LArTPC)	Measure neutrino-argon inelastic cross section	2025

== Operations timeline ==
The idea for the Coherent collaboration running at the SNS was first outlined in a white paper from 2012, eventually leading to funding first being approved in 2013. The first detector was a 14.6 kg doped CsI[Na] scintillator crystal deployed in 2015, and was used for the first detection of CEvNS in 2017. Since then, the Coherent collaboration has deployed various different and larger detectors, resulting in the first ever CEvNS detection in both argon and germanium nuclei.

The SNS also has upgrade plans that will benefit the Coherent collaboration, including an upgrade to the SNS proton beam that will bring the power to 2 MW by 2025, and a second target station planned to be operational in the 2030s. This will bring the final power to 2.8 MW with protons divided between the two stations.
