= Nuclear safeguards =

Nuclear safeguards are a set of technical, legal and institutional measures, used to verify that nuclear materials, facilities and technologies are adopted only for peaceful purposes and not directed towards developing nuclear weapons in accordance to the legal obligations under the Treaty on the Non-Proliferation of Nuclear Weapons (NPT).acc

Safeguards measures are designed for the early detection of diversion of nuclear material from declared facilities, undeclared processing or production of nuclear material, and undeclared nuclear material or activities in member states of the International Atomic Energy Agency (IAEA). Safeguards operate at overlapping levels which include national systems of accounting and control by individual states, regional verification organizations, and the international safeguards system implemented by the IAEA.

Safeguards form one of the central pillars of the global nuclear non-proliferation regime. The NPT is the foundational tool of this regime and is built around three pillars: achieving non-proliferation, moving towards nuclear disarmament, and allowing for the peaceful uses of nuclear energy. Article III of the NPT requires all non-nuclear-weapon states party to the treaty to accept verification, in the form of safeguards, from the IAEA on all peaceful nuclear materials, to ensure they are not diverted to non-peaceful applications. In addition to comprehensive safeguards agreements concluded under the NPT, safeguards are also implemented in states that are not party to the NPT, such as India, Pakistan, and Israel, on the basis of item-specific agreements concluded with the IAEA.

While the IAEA is the principal international verification authority, safeguards are not implemented by the organization alone. At the international level, nuclear safeguards are implemented by the IAEA, but regional organizations also play a major verification role. Such regional organizations include the Euratom in the European Union and the Brazilian–Argentine Agency for Accounting and Control of Nuclear Materials (ABACC) in South America and treaty-based nuclear-weapon-free zones that impose their own regional safeguards obligations. These regional and bilateral arrangements operate alongside, and in coordination with the IAEA, providing an additional layer of assurance between neighbouring or allied states. In practice, safeguards rely on a combination of verification techniques rather than a single method. These include nuclear material accounting, advanced non-destructive assay technologies such as neutron counting and gamma-ray spectroscopy, containment and surveillance measures and environmental sampling.

== International safeguards: The IAEA system ==
Internationally, nuclear safeguards are primarily implemented by the IAEA, under the authority granted to it by the NPT and the IAEA's own Statute. States that have joined the NPT as non-nuclear-weapon states are required to conclude a comprehensive safeguards agreement (CSA) with the IAEA, under which the IAEA verifies that all nuclear material in the state's nuclear activities are free from diversion to weapons purposes. Many states have also adopted an additional protocol (AP), which extends the IAEA's access to information and areas beyond the scope of the CSA, and a smaller number of states outside the NPT have adopted facility-specific safeguards agreements. As of 2024, the IAEA have applied safeguards in 190 states with agreements in force, carrying out thousands of inspections annually across nuclear facilities worldwide.

== Regional safeguards systems ==
=== Euratom safeguards ===
The Euratom treaty which established the European Atomic Energy Community (Euratom), is the foundation for the peaceful use of nuclear materials and technologies in the European Union and establishes a system, known as "Euratom safeguards”. The legal basis for Euratom safeguards is found in Chapter 7 of the Euratom Treaty, and Article 77 requires the Commission to ensure that there is no diversion of nuclear materials from peaceful uses. All users of nuclear materials within the EU are expected to provide information on their installations and report on the flows and inventories to the Commission, as outlined in Commission Regulation. The Commission verifies the correctness, completeness, and coherence of these declarations through documents review and physical on-site inspections at nuclear installations, after which it draws annual safeguards conclusions. Nuclear material accountancy and physical verification are the two main pillars of the Euratom safeguards system, with non-destructive assay techniques as a main verification method applied.

Euratom safeguards and IAEA safeguards are agreed within the scope of trilateral agreements involving member states, the Commission, and the IAEA. Because all EU member states are IAEA members and NPT parties, two multilateral safeguards agreements have been concluded: one between EU non-nuclear-weapon member states, Euratom, and the IAEA; and a separate agreement between France, Euratom, and the IAEA, reflecting France's status as a nuclear-weapon state. In implementing these agreements, the Commission and the IAEA collaborate closely by performing joint inspections and using common instruments and tools, while maintaining the ability to draw independent conclusions.

The European Commission's Joint Research Centre (JRC) provides research and development activities to provide assurance that nuclear safeguards is implemented and nuclear materials are used for civilian purposes as declared. The scientific activities of the JRC focuses on developing new concepts, tools and approaches for safeguards verification and to deliver education and training to safeguards inspectors and students.

=== Brazilian–Argentine Agency for Accounting and Control of Nuclear Materials ===
The Brazilian–Argentine Agency for Accounting and Control of Nuclear Materials (ABACC) established by Argentina and Brazil in 1991, is a binational safeguards body, created to verify that both countries use nuclear materials for only peaceful purposes. ABACC adopts the Common System of Accounting and Control (SCCC), a full-scope safeguards regime covering all nuclear material and activities in both countries, applied through bilateral inspections carried out by mutual technical experts drawn equally from each side. ABACC's role is reinforced by the Quadripartite Agreement, signed in December 1991 by Argentina, Brazil, ABACC, and the IAEA, which placed all nuclear facilities in both countries under IAEA safeguards in addition to ABACC's own bilateral verification. This layered structure means that nuclear material in Argentina and Brazil is subject to inspection by both a regional body and the IAEA. ABACC is widely cited as a confidence-building model for resolving regional proliferation concerns through bilateral cooperation rather than reliance on international oversight alone, and its establishment contributed to the ratification of the Treaty of Tlatelolco and accession to the NPT during the 1990s.

=== Nuclear-weapon-free zones ===
A nuclear-weapon-free zone (NWFZ) is a region in which countries pledge not to manufacture, acquire, test, or possess nuclear weapons. It creates a legal basis for strengthened regional safeguards obligations. There are five treaties on regional NWFZ covering Latin America and the Caribbean, the South Pacific, Southeast Asia, Africa, and Central Asia. The safeguards provisions set out in NWFZ treaties are similar to those in the NPT, as they require state parties to conclude comprehensive safeguards agreements with the IAEA. The Treaty of Semipalatinsk also requires state parties to conclude an Additional Protocol with the IAEA, which grants wider access to information and locations in a country.

Treaties of the NWFZ
Treaty	Region	Year	Safeguards requirement
Treaty of Tlatelolco	Latin America & Caribbean	1967	CSA with IAEA
Treaty of Rarotonga	South Pacific	1985	CSA with IAEA
Treaty of Bangkok	Southeast Asia	1995	CSA with IAEA
Treaty of Pelindaba	Africa	1996	CSA with IAEA
Treaty of Semipalatinsk	Central Asia	2006	CSA + AP required

== National systems of accounting and control (SSACs) ==
Under the NPT, each state party accepts safeguards in line with a bilateral agreement with the IAEA, and this requires the state to establish a state system of accounting for and control of nuclear material (SSAC) to support the verification process. The performance of national safeguards authorities and their SSACs has a significant impact on the effectiveness of implementing IAEA safeguards. The SSAC forms the basis of a state's reporting to the IAEA about the presence of nuclear materials in the state. While the IAEA is responsible for independently verifying that nuclear material is not diverted, control of nuclear material itself is treated under INFCIRC/153 as the responsibility of the state. A safeguards agreement detailed in INFCIRC/153 (Corrected) is required to provide that the state shall establish and maintain a system of accounting for and control of all nuclear material subject to safeguards under the agreement. The agreement mandates the Agency to examine the efficiency of the SSAC in carrying out its mission and to appropriately assess the success of SSACs.

== Types of safeguards measures ==
The effective implementation of nuclear safeguards depends on a combination of verification techniques rather than an individual method. Nuclear material accountancy is an essential safeguards measure applied with containment and surveillance measures which helps to verify that the flow of nuclear materials and inventories are as declared by the state under CSA and AP. These tools form a strategic verification system designed to detect both the diversion of declared material and the presence of undeclared activities.

=== Nuclear material accountancy ===
Nuclear material accounting is the process of determining the quantities of nuclear material within defined areas and tracking changes in those quantities over specified periods. Nuclear material accountancy is the practical implementation of this process by the facility operator, the state system of accounting for and control of nuclear material (SSAC), and the IAEA to fulfill the requirements of the safeguards agreement between the IAEA and the State (or group of States). It ensures that nuclear material is accurately accounted for, that the required reports are timely submitted to the IAEA, and that the IAEA can independently verify the accuracy and completeness of the accounting records.

=== Containment and surveillance ===
Containment and surveillance (C/S) measures are used to maintain continuity of knowledge of nuclear material and facilities between IAEA inspections. These measures include the use of seals, cameras, and other monitoring devices to prevent undetected access to or movement of nuclear material. When used alongside nuclear material accounting, C/S measures help the IAEA verify the correctness of accounting records while reducing the need for frequent physical verification activities. The IAEA also relies on remote and unattended monitoring systems to continuously observe nuclear material in the absence of inspectors. Currently, nearly 300 unattended systems, some of which transmit data directly to IAEA, support the effective and efficient maintenance of continuity of knowledge.

=== Environmental sampling ===
Environmental sampling involves taking samples for analysis to verify that a facility has been used as declared. With these samples, analysts are able to determine traces of materials that can reveal critical information about nuclear material or activities that have not been declared to the IAEA. Environmental sampling at specific locations within declared facilities is frequently applied to detect the presence of undeclared materials or declared materials in a different location, which can be a sign of diversion or undeclared processing. The additional protocol allows wide-area sampling outside of declared facilities to uncover undeclared facilities, but is not approved as a routine inspection tool and is generally applied in cases where a specific concern exists.

=== Safeguards by design ===
Safeguards by design (SBD) is a voluntary process that encourages the early integration of features into a nuclear facility's design for an easier application of IAEA safeguards. It allows verification requirements such as camera sightlines, inspection access points, and measurement locations to be included during the design and construction phase of a facility. This reduces the cost of retrofitting the facility to accommodate safeguards implementation after it has been constructed. SBD is increasingly promoted for new reactor technologies including small modular reactors (SMRs), where novel configurations may make conventional inspection approaches difficult to apply.

== Safeguards tools and equipment ==
Safeguards tools and equipment include the use of seals, surveillance cameras, and radiation detectors at nuclear facilities as containment and surveillance measures to maintain continuity of knowledge between IAEA inspections by prevent undetected access to nuclear material or the undeclared operation of nuclear facilities. To support safeguards implementation, the IAEA have deployed around 150 different types of safeguards equipment across four main categories: non-destructive assay (NDA), containment and surveillance (C/S), destructive analysis (DA), and environmental sampling (ES). The IAEA collects more than one million encrypted safeguards data records from over 1,400 surveillance cameras and 400 radiation and other monitoring sensors worldwide. In addition, more than 23,000 seals are installed at nuclear facilities to maintain the integrity of nuclear material and safeguard relevant equipment.

=== Seals ===
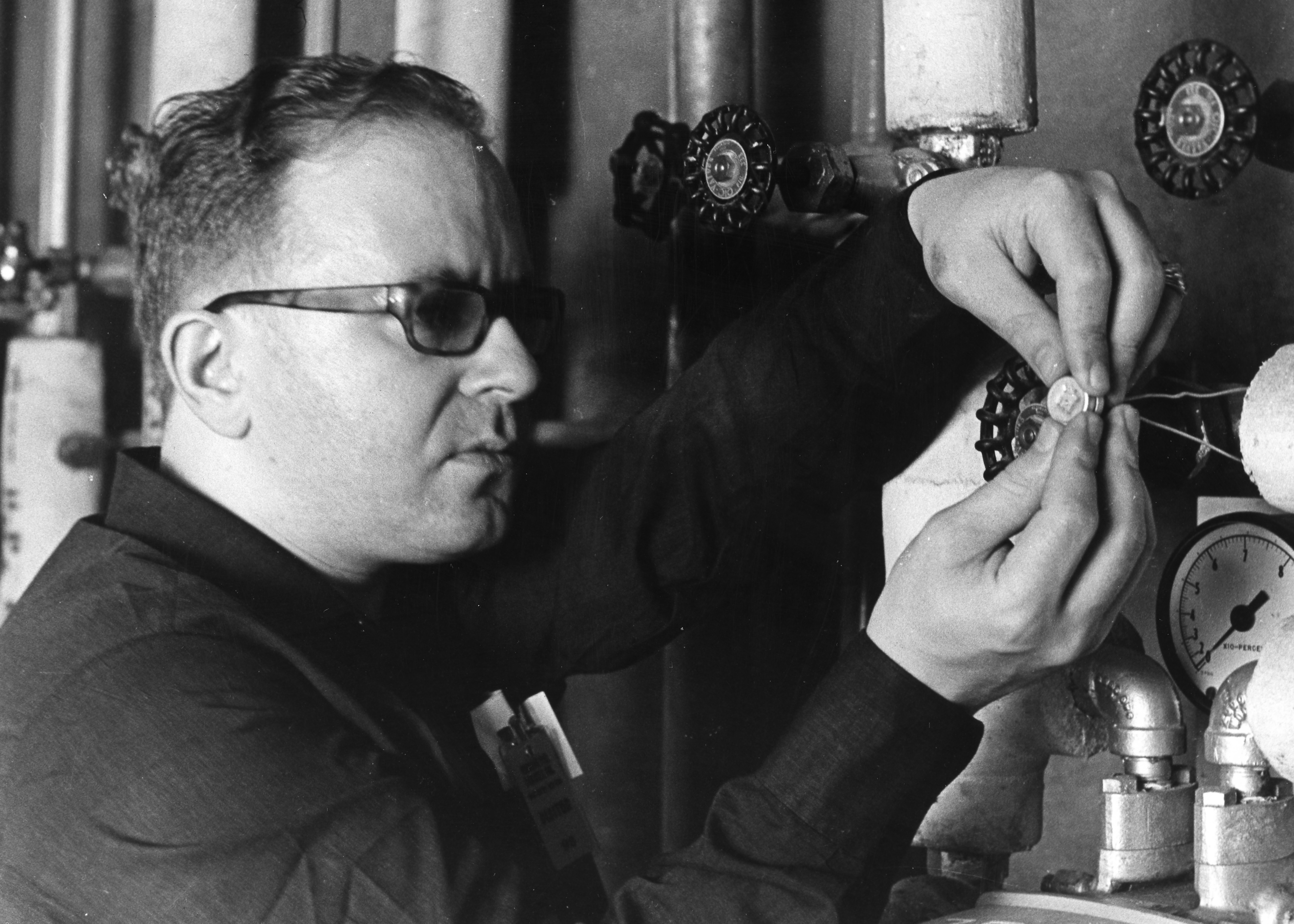
IAEA inspector applying a seal

The IAEA seal is the most used safeguards equipment. Even though simple, these tamper-indicating devices are efficient in preventing unauthorized access to safeguarded materials, IAEA safeguards equipment and provide a means of uniquely identifying secured containers. Seals are verified by examining an item's enclosure and the seal's identity and integrity for any sign of tampering or breakage.

=== Surveillance cameras ===
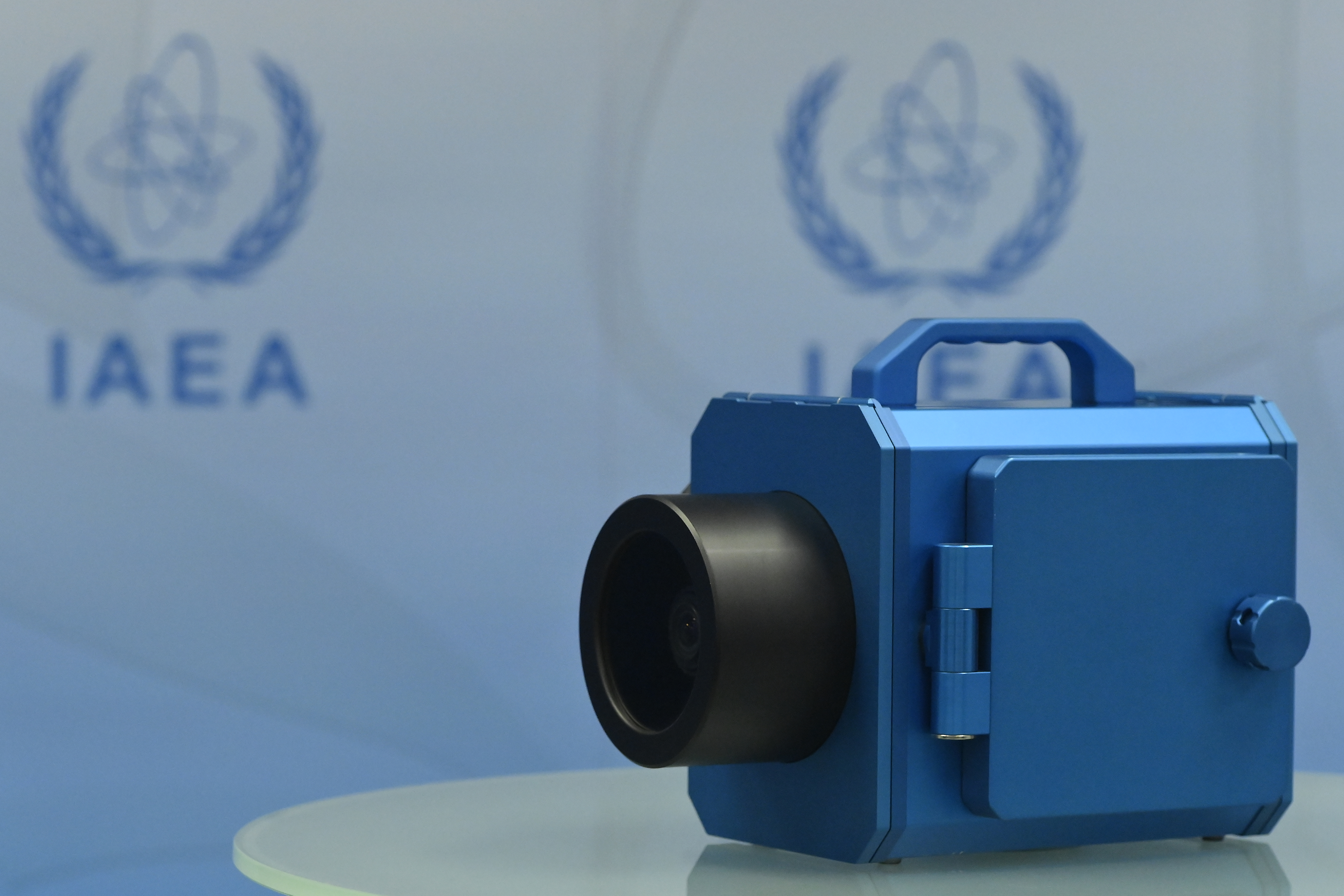
IAEA safeguards surveillance camera

In the absence of safeguards inspectors on site, cameras, tamper-revealing seals on equipment, and real-time radiation monitors are employed to gather and verify information about the activities of a facility. Surveillance cameras are installed at nuclear facilities to record activities at sensitive locations such as reactor heads, spent fuel ponds, and material transfer points, providing inspectors with a continuous record of events between visits. Video surveillance systems are an essential part in the implementation of IAEA safeguards, used to maintain continuity of knowledge over inventories of nuclear material and to support verification activities.

=== Unattended and remote monitoring systems ===
The IAEA uses nearly 300 unattended and remote monitoring systems to maintain continuity of knowledge between inspections while reducing the need for inspector presence in the field. These systems integrate radiation detectors, flow meters, cameras, and data loggers that operate independently, securely collecting and transmitting encrypted safeguards data to the IAEA. Systems such as the remotely monitored sealing array (RMSA) enhances verification by improving the efficiency and reliability of spent fuel monitoring. To support the increasing volume and complexity of safeguards data, the IAEA is also improving its safeguards information technology infrastructure through the modernisation of safeguards information technology (MOSAIC) project, providing a more secure platform for managing data from remote monitoring systems worldwide.

== Challenges and limitations ==
Despite the progression since the 1950s, nuclear safeguards continue to face a number of emerging challenges that make their effectiveness as a non-proliferation instrument more difficult. The first case of safeguards non-compliance was found in Iraq in 1991. Until that time, the IAEA had focused safeguards on declared nuclear materials and items, believing that any undeclared nuclear programme would be linked to the declared programme and detected easily. Safeguards inspections at the time did not detect Iraq's weapons programme because there were no obvious links to declared activities. The presence of information on nuclear technologies in open literature has led proliferators away from diversion in declared facilities, rather, they focus on illegal formation of weapons programmes.

This gave rise to the establishment of the Additional Protocol, which increases the IAEA's ability to verify that nuclear materials remain in peaceful uses through additional verification tools. Out of 190 states where the IAEA applied safeguards in 2024, 182 had comprehensive safeguards agreements in force, of which 137 also had Additional Protocols in force. The IAEA was able to conclude that declared nuclear material remained in peaceful activities for only 61 states, while the absence of undeclared nuclear material and activities are still ongoing. Despite its importance, universal application of the Additional Protocol has not yet been achieved, limiting the effectiveness of the international nuclear legal framework.

Traditional safeguards were primarily designed to verify declared nuclear material and facilities under a straightforward nuclear fuel cycle. However, the emergence of advanced reactor designs and their novel fuel cycles, the presence of proliferation sensitive technologies, and growing quantities of nuclear material have placed additional demands on the safeguards system. These challenges have highlighted the need for continuous adaptation of safeguards approaches, technologies, and legal frameworks to ensure that the IAEA can continue to provide credible assurance that nuclear material remains in peaceful use.

== Emerging technologies and future challenges ==
=== Artificial intelligence and data analytics ===
The IAEA is strengthening its safeguards capabilities by investing in technologies and methods that enhance the detection of undeclared nuclear material and activities. These efforts include the adoption of advanced detection technologies and the improvement of safeguards analytical laboratories, to provide timely and reliable analysis of nuclear material and environmental samples. The Agency is also exploring the use of emerging technologies, including artificial intelligence (AI), to improve safeguards implementation. Further discussions at the 2020 IAEA Emerging Technologies Workshop concluded that AI is most effective when applied to repetitive, well defined tasks, that its deployment should be supported by a clear implementation strategy, and that it is intended to complement, rather than replace, human expertise and high quality data.

=== Small modular reactors ===
The global expansion of small modular reactors (SMRs) poses new challenges for traditional safeguards implementation. SMRs may be deployed in locations remote from existing nuclear infrastructure, potentially operate with longer refuelling cycles or sealed cores which complicate conventional inspection-based approaches. The concept of safeguards by design, previously described is relevant for SMR deployment, as introducing verification features into the reactor design from the onset is beneficial.

=== Naval nuclear propulsion ===
The AUKUS partnership has introduced new safeguards challenges because Australia is a non-nuclear weapon State with a comprehensive safeguards agreement in force with the IAEA. Under the safeguards system, nuclear material used for naval nuclear propulsion may be temporarily withdrawn from routine IAEA safeguards, creating unique verification challenges. As a result, Australia and the IAEA are developing an approach that maintains effective verification while protecting sensitive naval information, with a strong emphasis on safeguards by design for new facilities associated with Australia's nuclear powered submarine programme. Similarly, Brazil has been working with the IAEA to establish safeguards arrangements for its own nuclear powered submarine programme, highlighting the need for robust verification approaches for naval nuclear propulsion programmes in non-nuclear weapon States.

== Nuclear safety, security, and safeguards ==
In the nuclear industry, three distinct but interrelated disciplines called safety, security, and safeguards and collectively referred to as "3S" addresses different aspects of nuclear risk. Nuclear safety refers to measures designed to protect people and the environment from the harmful effects of ionizing radiation which can result from accidents or operational failures, while nuclear security addresses the protection of nuclear materials and facilities from malicious acts by non-state actors such as theft, sabotage, or terrorism. On the other hand, nuclear safeguards addresses the state as the primary potential actor, and applies technical measures to verify that nuclear facilities are not misused and nuclear material is not diverted from peaceful uses by states.

Despite their distinct objectives, nuclear safety, security and safeguards are closely interconnected. For example, nuclear material accountancy, which forms the foundation of safeguards, also strengthens nuclear security by ensuring accurate records of the location, quantity, and movement of nuclear material. Likewise, physical protection measures, such as access controls and surveillance systems implemented for security purposes, also support safeguards by maintaining continuity of knowledge and preventing unauthorized access to nuclear material.

== See also ==
- African Nuclear-Weapon-Free Zone Treaty
- Central Asian Nuclear Weapon Free Zone
- Nuclear reactor
- Nondestructive testing
- Southeast Asian Nuclear-Weapon-Free Zone Treaty
- Treaty of Rarotonga
- Treaty of Tlatelolco
