= CONUS experiment =

Nuclear research project

Coordinates: 53.850731°N 9.345844°E

The CONUS (COherent Neutrino nUcleus Scattering) experiment is a research project at the commercial nuclear power plant in Brokdorf, Germany (see Figure 1). The CONUS project is sponsored by the Max-Planck-Institut für Kernphysik and Preussen Elektra GmbH.

The CONUS project is searching for the fundamental process of coherent elastic neutrino-nucleus scattering. The primary goal is to confirm the existence of this process and to use this interaction type to investigate further neutrino properties within and beyond the Standard Model of elementary particle physics.

== Science principles and motivation ==
Figure 2: Representation of the coherent elastic neutrino scattering off an atomic nucleus via the exchange of a neutral Z-boson

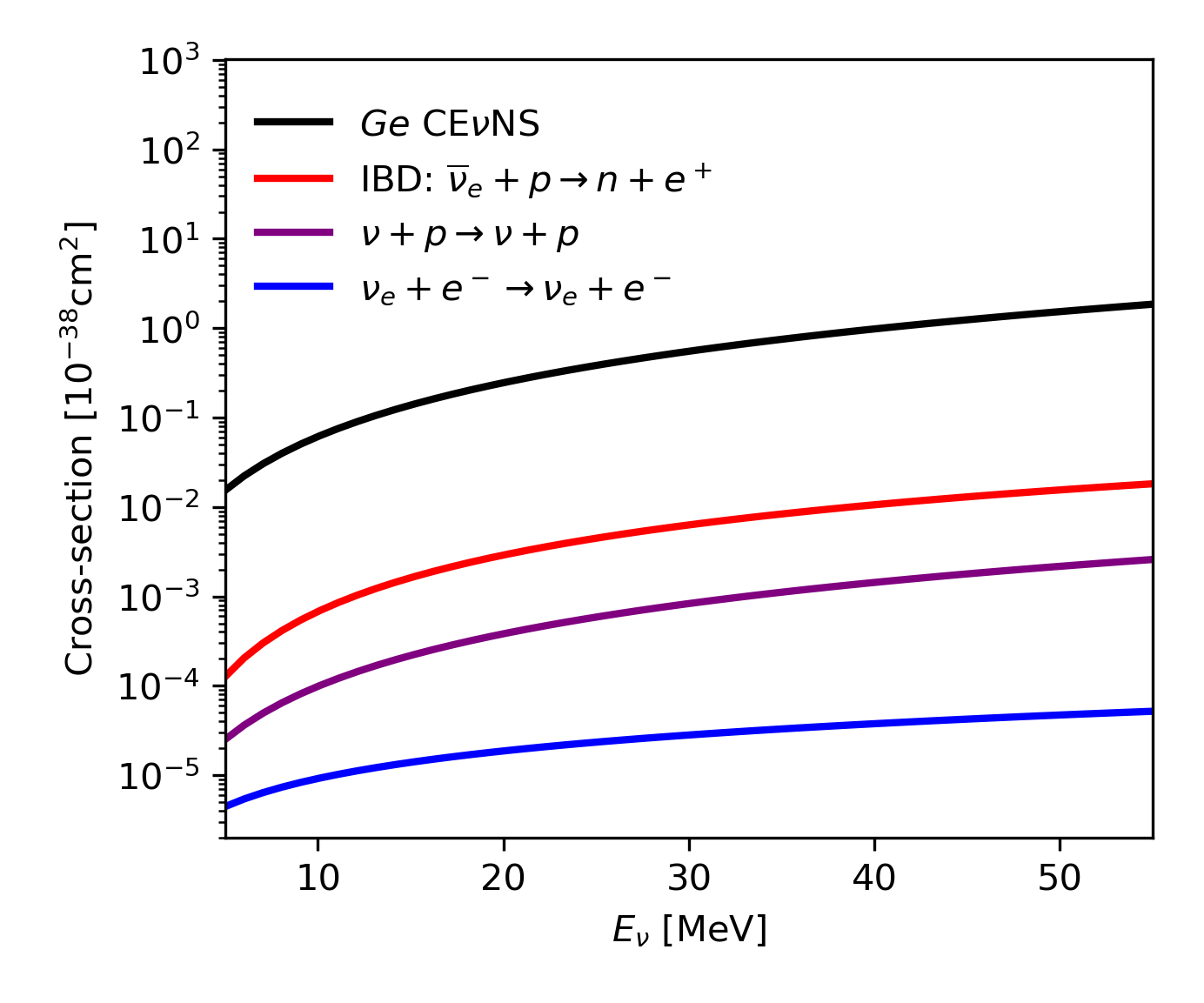
Figure 3: Energy-dependent cross section of coherent elastic neutrino nucleus scattering versus the cross sections of neutrino-proton scattering, of the inverse beta decay and of the neutrino-electron scattering

As electrically neutral leptons, neutrinos only interact via the weak force with other particles. Due to this fact, neutrino detectors are generally very large and filled with several (kilo)tons of target material.

There are basically two possibilities to detect neutrinos: First, they can interact with the electrons in the atomic shell of a target atom, and second they can interact with the protons and neutrons of an atomic nucleus. Interactions between neutrinos and electrons as well as neutrinos and nuclear constituents have already been well studied.

However, at low energies up to a maximum of a few tens of MeV, neutrinos can interact coherently with the nucleus as a whole (see Figure 2). This process was predicted in 1974 and is known as coherent elastic neutrino nucleus scattering (CEνNS, pronounced "sevens"). Although its cross section is several magnitudes larger than the cross section of the conventionally used interaction channels (see Figure 3), the tiny recoil of the struck nucleus leads to a very low energy release, making the process very hard to detect. Therefore, experiments investigating this process need detectors with an extremely low energy threshold, i.e., below 1 kilo-electronvolt (keV). On the other hand, since the CEνNS interaction cross sections is enhanced, a few kilogram of detector material can already be enough to detect the interaction.

As the first experiment worldwide, the COHERENT Collaboration was able to experimentally prove the existence of coherent elastic neutrino-nucleus scattering in 2017. Herein, it used a relatively high energy neutrino beam in comparison with reactor neutrinos. Further complementary studies at lower energies in the fully coherent regime are yet to come. Examining this low energy neutrino region is the main goal of the CONUS project.

== Detector ==
=== Site ===
The detection as well as detailed investigations of the properties of CEνNS utilizing neutrinos from a nuclear reactor require the detector to be located as close as possible to the reactor core to guarantee a maximized neutrino flux. To achieve this, the CONUS detector is located at a distance of 17 m from the reactor core inside the nuclear reactor facility at Brokdorf, see Figure 4. This is only possible due to the selected detector technology such that it can be placed inside the facility without interfering with the operation of the reactor.

The Brokdoft reactor runs at a maximum thermal power of 3.9 GW, making it one of the most powerful in the world. On average, about 7.2 neutrinos are produced per nuclear fission (6 from fission products and 1.2 due to decays after neutron captures on Uranium-238). At the detector site this results in a flux of about 23 trillion neutrinos per second and square centimeter.

=== Detectors and measurement ===
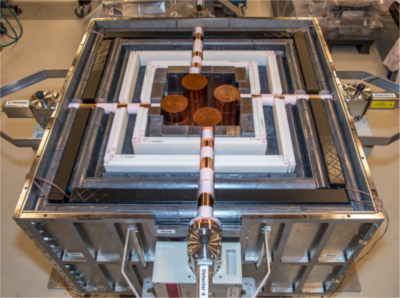
Figure 5: Photo showing the opened CONUS shield and the 4 Germanium detectors

The CONUS Collaboration is using four highly pure germanium semiconductor detectors, each weighing 1 kg (see Figure 5).

If a neutrino originating from the reactor core scatters off a germanium nucleus, the small recoil energy of the nucleus is partially converted into ionization energy and partially into dissipation heat. Only the first energy part contributes to electrical signal formation in the ionisation detectors as used in CONUS. The dissipation phenomenon is known as quenching and is typically described by the Lindhard theory. Thus, a precise knowledge of this quenching factor is crucial, since its uncertainty is one of the main systematics of the experiment. To detect coherent elastic neutrino nucleus scattering, CONUS is collecting reactor-on and reactor-off data. By comparing these data, an excess of events in the expected energy window during reactor-on time can reveal the existence of CEνNS. In addition, measurements during reactor-off times allow for a precise determination of the background rate and its components. CONUS started collecting data on April 1, 2018, and has been continuously operated since then.

=== Shield ===
Although CEνNS is the neutrino interaction with the highest cross section, it still is a rare process. Moreover, since it comes with a very small energy and momentum transfer (<1 keV), a suitable detector needs to be shielded from any additional background. The three main background types and their mitigation strategies applied in CONUS are summarized here:
The relevant backgrounds can be put into 3 different categories:

- Cosmic Radiation: Cosmic muons and muon-induced showers can interact with the target material of the detector in large quantities. Thus, cosmic radiation is one of the most relevant backgrounds. To suppress this type of background, many low background experiments are located deep underground. This is however not possible for CONUS; here the reactor building offers a modest overburden leading to a reduction of the muon flux by a factor of 2-3 only. To achieve an even better suppression of the muonic background, the CONUS detector is surrounded by an active muon veto system (see Figure 5). It consists of scintillator layers that can detect incoming muons crossing the detector setup. This way, the muon-induced background can be reduced approximately by a factor of 100.
- Local Background: Besides cosmic radiation, there is also background coming from the direct surroundings. The most important contributions to the local background are naturally occurring radioactivity in the surroundings and neutrons radiated from the reactor core. To shield the detectors against this background, they are covered with several layers of lead (25 cm in total) as well as boron-doped polyethylene plates (see Figure 5). Another important background source that experiments (especially those located in a closed environment) have to deal with is the radioactive decay of airborne radon. Radon is an inert gas and can therefore leak through tiniest gaps of the shield layers and decay close to the detectors. To solve this problem, the detector chamber is continuously flushed with radon-free air from compressed air bottles.
- Intrinsic Radioactivity: The detectors also contain small concentrations of radioactive isotopes. Hence, it is necessary to minimize the amount of radioactive impurities inside the detector. To achieve this goal, the materials used to build the detector were carefully analyzed with the help of the GIOVE detector at the underground laboratory of the Max-Planck-Institut für Kernphysik and selected correspondingly.

Despite the small volume of the CONUS setup of 1.6m^3, the massive high-density shield leads to a total mass of 11 tons.

== Results ==
=== January 2021 ===
In 2020, The CONUS project published first results on CEνNS using 3.73 kg of active detector material after almost 70 days of effective measurement time with the reactor turned on and about 16 days with the reactor turned off. With these data the until now most precise upper limit for the existence of the CEνNS process in the fully coherent regime could be determined. This limit constitutes valuable information for basic neutrino research, since it allows one to test predictions for the strength of CEνNS in the standard model theory or in variations of it. The unique performance of the CONUS detectors with their very low energy thresholds, ultra-low background levels and long-term stability is highlighted in Ref.

With additional data collected until and beyond the end of the reactor operation in late 2021, additional improvements of the data acquisition systems and a better understanding of the quenching factor in germanium, the sensitivity of the experiment is expected to improve significantly in the next few years.

=== January 2025 ===
On January 9, 2025, a paper was published on the pre-print server ArXiv, announcing the possible first measurement of coherent elastic neutrino-nucleus scattering from reactor antineutrinos, which would be the first observation of the interaction in the full coherence regime. The paper claims a statistical significance of 3.7σ (5σ is considered the standard for discovery in physics) and was published in Nature after peer review. After 119 days of reactor on time, 395 ±106 events were detected, which is in agreement with the standard model prediction of 347 ± 59 events.

== Applications ==
Understanding the process of coherent elastic neutrino nucleus scattering may offer some possibilities in other areas, too.

It is generally expected that the coherent elastic neutrino nucleus scattering process plays a significant role in the dynamics of Core-Collapse Supernovae. Investigating this process will therefore help to better understand the dynamics of such stellar explosions. Furthermore a detailed study of coherent elastic neutrino nucleus scattering could potentially reveal some new physics beyond the standard model of particle physics. For instance, it could be used to study electromagnetic properties of neutrinos (e.g. neutrino magnetic moment), to investigate potential deviations of the weak mixing angle at low energies or to study possible non-standard interactions in the neutrino-quark sector.

Besides its fundamental importance for basic science, the detection of neutrinos via CEνNS offers some practical applications. One example is the possibility to use CONUS-like detectors for reactor monitoring.
