= MINOS+ =

Particle physics experiment

Coordinates: 47°49′12″N 92°14′30″W

MINOS+ was a continuation of the MINOS experiment (Main injector neutrino oscillation search) to measure neutrino oscillation with improved electronics. It started taking data in 2013 and ran for 3 years. The experiment ended and a 6-month dismantling project began in early October 2016.

== Physics goals ==
- Measure sin^{2}2θ and Δm^{2} with higher precision.
- Measure sin^{2}2θ̅ and Δm̅^{2} with higher precision.
- Study high energy neutrinos
- Search for sterile neutrinos
- Search for tau neutrinos
- Non-standard interactions
- Measurement of the neutrino time of flight
- Search for extra dimensions
- Atmospheric neutrinos

== Neutrino beam ==
MINOS+ uses the NuMI beamline generated at Fermilab. To produce the beamline, 120 GeV proton pulses from the Main Injector hit a water-cooled graphite target. The resulting interactions of protons with the target material produce pions and kaons, which are focused by a system of magnetic horns. These then travel down a long decay tunnel, and their decay produces a neutrino beam parallel to the meson beam. Most of these are muon neutrinos, with a small electron neutrino contamination. Neutrino interactions in the near detector are used to measure the initial neutrino flux and energy spectrum. Because they are weakly interacting and therefore usually pass through matter, the vast majority of the neutrinos travel through the near detector and the 734 km of rock, then through the far detector and off into space. For the initial 3-year run the NuMI beam will be in its medium energy configuration which will deliver the majority of neutrinos with an energy between 4 GeV and 10 GeV.

== Relationship with NOνA ==
NOνA sits 14 milliradians off the central line of the NuMI beam. At this angle, there is an enhancement of neutrinos with an energy of 2 GeV, at which the L/E (baseline divided by energy) maximizes the oscillation of muon neutrinos. This causes a problem in that the signal you are looking for is a dip in a peak. MINOS+ sits on the central line of the beam so the full beam make up is seen, thus helping control systematic errors for the NuMI beam energy.
