= Monitored neutrino beam =

Monitored neutrino beams are facilities for the production of neutrinos with unprecedented control of the flux of particles created inside and outside the facility.

== Accelerator neutrinos ==
Accelerator neutrino beams are beams of neutrinos produced by particle accelerators. Since neutrinos are neutral particles that feebly interact with matter, monitoring the production rate of neutrinos at accelerators is a major experimental challenge. M. Schwartz and B. Pontecorvo proposed to exploit accelerators to produce neutrinos in 1960. Their ideas brought to the first neutrino experiment where neutrinos were produced by an accelerator from the scattering of protons in a beryllium target. The scattering produces a wealth of particles and, in particular, pions, which decay producing muons and neutrinos. The experiment, first carried out by Lederman, Schwartz, Steinberger and collaborators demonstrated the existence of two neutrino flavors. At that time, protons were not even steered outside the accelerator but the target was inserted close to the proton orbit. The protons in the AGS accelerator of the Brookhaven National Laboratory were brought to strike an internal Be target in a short straight session of the accelerator. Modern experiments steer the protons outside the accelerator and focus the particles produced after the target by magnetic horns or a static focusing system based on quadrupoles and dipoles. The focusing system increases the flux of pions pointing toward the neutrino detector and selects the charge and momentum of these pions. After focusing, pions propagate along a tunnel and decay by reactions like $\pi \rightarrow \mu \nu$ . All undecayed pions and all muons are stopped at the end of the tunnel while the neutrinos cross the wall of the tunnel because their interaction probability is very small. At large distances from the end of the tunnel, no particles are present except for an intense flux of neutrinos.

== Diagnostics and flux determination ==
In early experiments, the flux of neutrinos was estimated by measuring the number of pions produced after the target and monitoring the muons produced at the end of the tunnel. After the discovery of neutrino oscillation, the need for high precision beams fostered the construction of sophisticated monitoring systems. They are based on dedicated experiments to measure the number of particles produced by proton interactions on solid-state targets (beryllium, graphite). The beamline comprises the proton beam, target, focusing system, and decay tunnel, and it is simulated by Monte Carlo methods. Variations of the flux are monitored in real-time by measuring the number of protons impinging on the target and the rate of muons. All these techniques are the basic toolkit of accelerator neutrino physicists and are inherited by beam diagnostics.

== Modern monitored neutrino beams ==
Monitored neutrino beams are beams where diagnostic can directly measure the flux of neutrinos because the experimenters monitor the production of the lepton associated with the neutrino at the single-particle level. For instance, if a muon neutrino is produced by a $\pi^{+} \rightarrow \mu^+ \nu_{\mu}$ decay, its appearance is signaled by the observation of the corresponding antimuon. This is a direct estimate because the number of antimuons produced by those decays is equal to the number of muon neutrinos. Similarly, an electron neutrino produced by a kaon decay -for instance $K^{+} \rightarrow e^+ \pi^0 \nu_{e}$ - is signaled by the observation of a positron. Monitoring the production of leptons in the decay tunnel of an accelerator neutrino beam is a challenge because the number of leptons and background particles is huge. In the 1980s, monitored neutrino beams were built in the USSR in the framework of the "tagged neutrino beam facility". This facility did not reach a flux sufficient to feed neutrino experiments and was later descoped to a tagged kaon beam facility. Current neutrino beams record muons but they have not reached single-particle sensitivity. Their precision on flux (15%) cannot beat conventional techniques, yet. The most advanced monitored neutrino beam project is ENUBET, which aims at designing a monitored neutrino beam for high precision neutrino cross-section measurements.

== Tagged neutrino beams ==
Monitored neutrino beams detect the charged leptons produced in the decay tunnel but the experimenters do not attempt to identify simultaneously the charged lepton and the neutrino produced by the decay of the parent particle. For example, a $\pi^+ \rightarrow \mu^+ \nu_\mu$ decay creates an antimuon $\mu^+$ that can be detected inside the tunnel by a particle detector. The vast majority of neutrinos cross the tunnel without interacting but a handful of them interacts in the neutrino detector, which is generally located far from the tunnel. If the time resolution of the particle detector in the tunnel and the neutrino detector outside the tunnel is very good (below 1 ns), the experimenters can associate unambiguously the neutrino observed in the detector with the charged lepton recorded in the tunnel. These facilities are called (time) tagged neutrino beams and were proposed by L.N. Hand and B. Pontecorvo in the 1960s. To date, an intense and time-tagged neutrino facility has never been built.
