= Karol Lang =

Experimental particle physicist

- Born: Warsaw, Poland
- Education: Liceum No. XIV (K. Gottwald), Warsaw, Poland
- Alma mater: University of Warsaw (M.S.), University of Rochester (Ph.D.)
- Spouse: Małgorzata Pogorzelska
- Children: Marta K., Maxim K.
- Awards: Outstanding Junior Investigator (U.S. Department of Energy), Fellow of American Physical Society
- Scientific career
- Fields: Experimental particle physics, particle detectors, nuclear medical imaging
- Institutions: University of Warsaw; Instytut Badań Jądrowych, University of Rochester; Stanford University; University of Texas at Austin; Visiting Professor: University of Osaka; LAPP (Annecy-Le-Vieux); University of Warsaw; Université de Paris XI
- Thesis: An Experimental Study of Dimuon Production in High Energy Neutrino Interactions
- Academic advisors: S. Wójcicki (Stanford), A. Bodek (Rochester), H. Białkowska (Warsaw)
- Website: www.hep.utexas.edu/cpf/lang

Karol Sylwester Lang is an experimental particle physicist and the Jane and Roland Blumberg Professor of Physics at the University of Texas at Austin.

== Education ==
Karol Sylwester Lang is an experimental particle physicist and the Jane and Roland Blumberg Professor of Physics at the University of Texas at Austin. Lang received his Master of Science in physics in 1979 from the University of Warsaw, and his Ph.D. in physics in 1985 from the University of Rochester.

For his M.S. thesis, he conducted studies of collisions of relativistic alpha particles (He-4) with nuclei of tantalum mounted in a liquid propane bubble chamber, an experiment that took data using a 10-GeV synchro-phasitron of the Joint Institute of Nuclear Research in Dubna, Russia (then Soviet Union). After graduation, he became a research assistant at the Instytut Badań Jądrowych.

In 1981, he was admitted to a graduate program of the University of Rochester. After initially working with Prof. Tom Ferbel he joined the group of Prof. Arie Bodek to work on the Chicago-Columbia-Fermilab-Rochester (CCFR) and Rockefeller neutrino experiment E701 at Fermi National Accelerator Laboratory (Fermilab). E701 was conceived to search for neutrino oscillations using a narrow-band beam of neutrinos and two detectors separated by a distance of 1 km (the 'near' detector was installed in Wonder Building and the 'far' detector was in Lab E). Lang's Ph.D. dissertation, defended in May 1985, was focused on "Experimental Studies of Dimuons in High Energy Neutrino Interactions". Results laid to rest an anomaly of "like-sign dimuons" - a previously hinted unexpected high-rate of same sign two-muon (dimuon) final states in neutrino interactions. The work also reported the measurement of the fraction of strange quarks in nucleons based on the analysis of opposite-sign dimuons.

== Career and research ==
As a postdoctoral associate at the University of Rochester, Lang worked at Stanford Linear Accelerator Center (SLAC) on a deep inelastic electron scattering experiment (SLAC E140 ) measuring the spin content of the nucleon and on a search for low-mass axions (SLAC E141). In 1986, he joined the group of Prof. Stanley Wójcicki at Stanford University to work on a search for rare decays of neutral kaons at Brookhaven National Laboratory (BNL) on Long Island, NY. In 1991, Lang assumed a faculty position at the University of Texas at Austin, 160 miles south of Waxahachie, near Dallas, where an ill-fated Superconducting Super Collider (SSC), cancelled in October 1993, was being constructed.

The two BNL experiments, E791 (beam exposure 1986 to 1988) and E871 (1993 to 1996) pioneered blind analysis in particle physics and reached unprecedented sensitivities for branching fractions into two leptons in the final state B(K^{0}_{L} → μ e) < 4.7 × 10^{−12} eliminating some leading and then attractive theories proposing such transitions beyond the Standard Model. A collateral and significant success of E871 included high precision studies of the μ^{+}μ^{−} decay of kaons (mediated by the GIM mechanism) and a first observation of four events of K^{0}_{L} → e^{+} e^{−} [B(K^{0}_{L} → e^{+}e^{−})= (8.7 ^{+5.7}_{-4.1}) x 10 ^{−12}] that is the rarest to-date measured decay of any elementary particle. In 1990, the E791 collaboration was joined by Prof. Val Fitch's group from Princeton to conduct a search for a hypothetical doubly-strange dibaryon H. The experiment E888 (1991-1992) used a reconfigured apparatus of E791 and set stringent limits on the production of H.

In 1995, Lang joined a newly proposed MINOS experiment at Fermilab, a long-baseline search for neutrino oscillations. Discovery of neutrino oscillations in Japan in 1998 invigorated the physics program of MINOS that took data between 2003 (since 2005 with the NuMI neutrino beam) and 2012. The experiments operated two detectors separated by 734 km. It continued at a higher beam energy as MINOS+ between 2013 and 2016. Lang and Prof. Jennifer Anne Thomas of UCL are Co-Spokespersons of MINOS+. Together, MINOS and MINOS+ achieved some of the most precise determination of oscillation parameters θ_{23} and Δm^{2}_{32} and have set some of the most stringent constraints on the existence of sterile neutrinos and other processes beyond the Standard Model.

Since 2004 Lang has also contributed to the NEMO-3 and SuperNEMO experiments designed to discover the neutrinoless double-beta decay. This process, if observed, would demonstrate neutrino to be a Majorana particle (i.e., particle and anti-particle represent the same fundamental quantum field). The NEMO detection technique was invented by Serge Jullian and collaborators at LAL Orsay and successfully applied to seven isotopic samples of NEMO-3 (Ca-48, Se-82, Zr-96, Mo-100, Cd-116, Te-130, and Nd-150). NEMO-3 has reached an upper limit for an effective neutrino mass of 330 - 620 meV, where the range reflects the uncertainty of the nuclear matrix element. The goal of SuperNEMO is further improvement of the experimental method that would allow to probe the effective neutrino mass in the 50 meV range.

Lang has led development of instrumentation for BNL, Fermilab, and SuperNEMO experiments. It included high-rate thin drift straw tubes , extruded plastic scintillator with wavelength-shifting fiber readout using multi-anode photomultipliers , deployment of radioactive calibration sources, and light injection and monitoring system for calorimeters.
