= Gargamelle =

CERN Bubble chamber particle detector

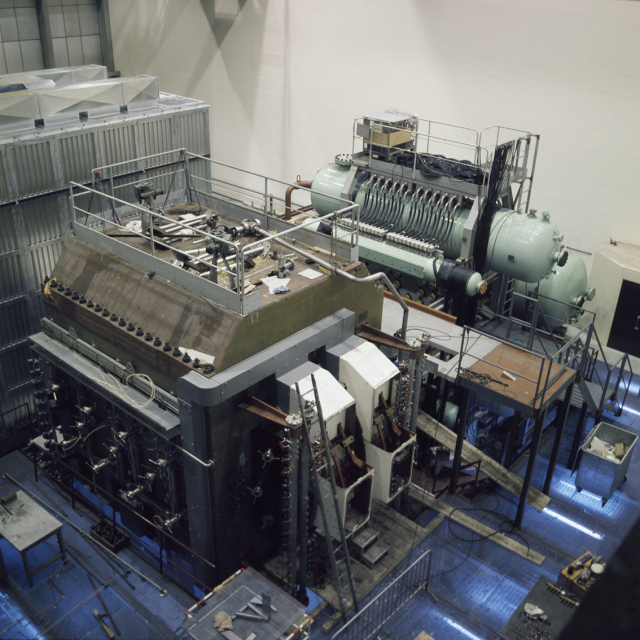
View of Gargamelle bubble chamber detector in the West Hall at CERN, February 1977

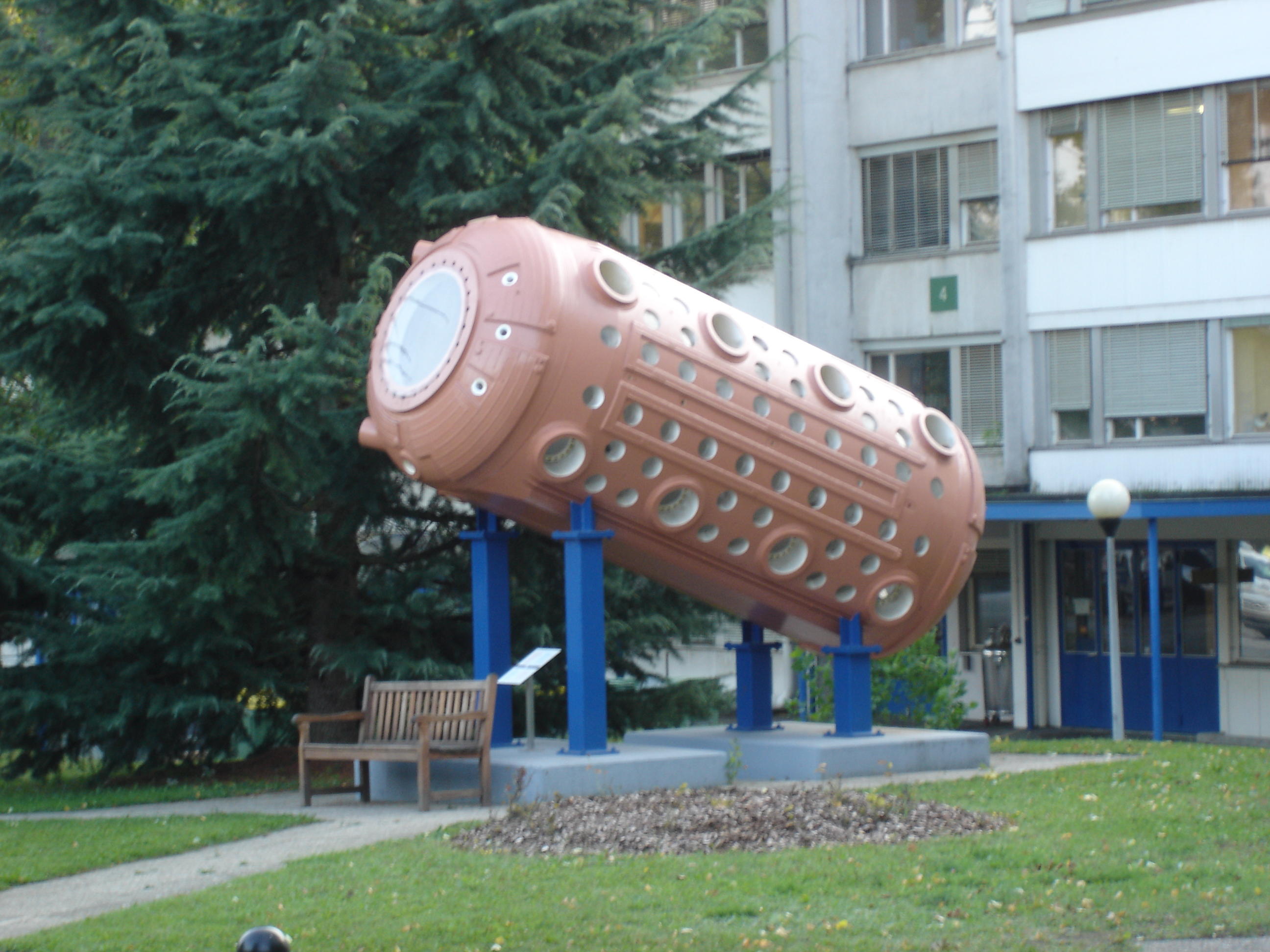
The chamber of Gargamelle is currently on exhibition at CERN

Gargamelle was a heavy liquid bubble chamber detector in operation at CERN between 1970 and 1979. It was designed to detect neutrinos and antineutrinos, which were produced with a beam from the Proton Synchrotron (PS) between 1970 and 1976, before the detector was moved to the Super Proton Synchrotron (SPS). In 1979, an irreparable crack was discovered in the bubble chamber, and the detector was decommissioned. It is currently part of the "Microcosm" exhibition at CERN, open to the public.

Gargamelle is notable for being the experiment to discover neutral currents. Found in July 1973, neutral currents were the first experimental indication of the existence of the Z^{0} boson, and consequently a major step towards the verification of the electroweak theory.

Gargamelle can refer to both the bubble chamber detector itself, or the high-energy physics experiment by the same name. The name itself is derived from a 16th-century novel by François Rabelais, The Life of Gargantua and of Pantagruel, in which the giantess Gargamelle is the mother of Gargantua.

== Background ==
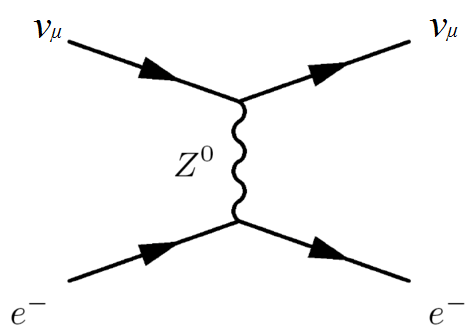
An event in which the electron and neutrino changes momentum and/or energy by exchange of the neutral Z^{0} boson. Flavors are unaffected.

In a series of separate works in the 1960s Sheldon Glashow, Steven Weinberg, and Abdus Salam came up with a theory that unified electromagnetic and weak interaction between elementary particles—the electroweak theory—for which they shared the 1979 Nobel Prize in Physics. Their theory predicted the existence of the W^{±} and Z^{0} bosons as propagators of the weak force. W^{±} bosons have electric charge, either positive (W^{+}) or negative (W^{−}), the Z^{0}, however, has no charge. Exchange of a Z^{0} boson transfers momentum, spin, and energy but leaves the particle's quantum numbers unaffected—charge, flavor, baryon number, lepton number, etc. Since there is no transfer of electric charge, the exchange of a Z^{0} is referred to as "neutral current". Neutral currents were a prediction of the electroweak theory.

In 1960 Melvin Schwartz proposed a method of producing an energetic neutrino beam. Such a beam was then used by Schwartz and others in an experiment in 1962 at Brookhaven which showed that there are different types of neutrinos: muon neutrinos and electron neutrinos. Schwartz shared the 1988 Nobel Prize in Physics for this discovery. Prior to Schwartz' idea weak interactions had been studied only in the decay of elementary particles, especially strange particles. Using these new neutrino beams greatly increased the energy available for the study of the weak interaction. Gargamelle was one of the first experiments that made use of a neutrino beam, produced with a proton beam from the PS.

A bubble chamber is simply a container filled with a superheated liquid. A charged particle travelling through the chamber will leave an ionization track, around which the liquid vaporizes, forming microscopic bubbles. The entire chamber is subject to a constant magnetic field, causing the tracks of the charged particles to curve. The radius of curvature is proportional to the momentum of the particle. The tracks are photographed, and by studying the tracks one can learn about the properties of the particles detected. The neutrino beam which travelled through the Gargamelle bubble chamber did not leave any tracks in the detector, since neutrinos have no charge. Interactions with neutrinos were therefore detected, by observing particles produced by the interactions of the neutrinos with the constituents of matter. Neutrinos have extremely small cross sections, i.e., the probability of interaction is very small. Whereas bubble chambers typically are filled with liquid hydrogen, Gargamelle was filled with a heavy liquid—CBrF_{3} (Freon)—increasing the probability of seeing neutrino interactions.

== Conception and construction ==
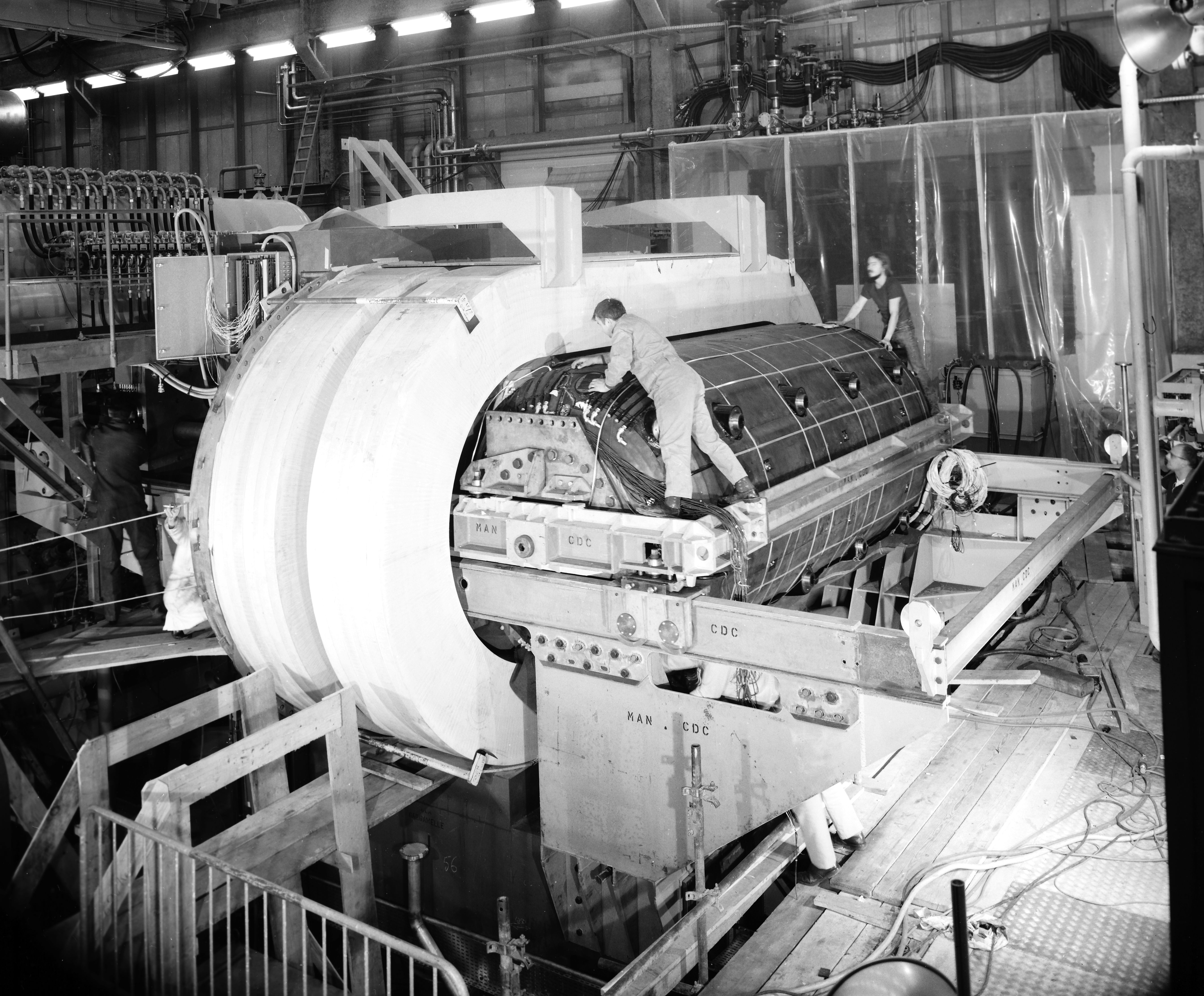
Installation of the Gargamelle chamber body. Placement of the chamber in the oblong shaped magnet coils.

The domain of neutrino physics was in rapid expansion in the 60's. Neutrino experiments using bubble chambers were already running at the first synchrotron at CERN, the PS, and the question of the next generation of bubble chambers had been on the agenda for some time. André Lagarrigue, an esteemed physicist at the École Polytechnique in Paris, and some of his colleagues, wrote the first published report, dated 10 February 1964, proposing the construction of a heavy liquid chamber to be built under the supervision of CERN. He formed a collaboration consisting of seven laboratories: École Polytechnique Paris, RWTH Aachen, ULB Bruxelles, Istituto di Fisica dell'Università di Milano, LAL Orsay, University College London and CERN. The group met in Milan in 1968 to list the physics priorities for the experiment: today Gargamelle is famous for its discovery of the neutral currents, but while preparing the physics program the topic was not even discussed, and in the final proposal it is ranked as fifth in priority. At the time there was no consensus around the electroweak theory, which might explain the list of priorities. Also, earlier experiments looking for neutral currents in the decay of the neutral kaon into two charged leptons, had measured very small limits of around 10^{−7}.

Due to budgetary crisis, the experiment was not approved in 1966, contrary to what was expected. Victor Weisskopf, Director General at CERN, and Bernard Grégory, Scientific Director, decided to commit the money themselves, the latter offering a loan to CERN to cover the instalment due for 1966. The final contract was signed on 2 December 1965, making this the first time in CERN's history that an investment of this kind was not approved by the council, but by the Director General using his executive authority.

The Gargamelle chamber was entirely constructed at Saclay. Though the construction was delayed by about two years, it was finally assembled at CERN in December 1970, and the first data taking run occurred in March 1971.

== Experimental setup ==
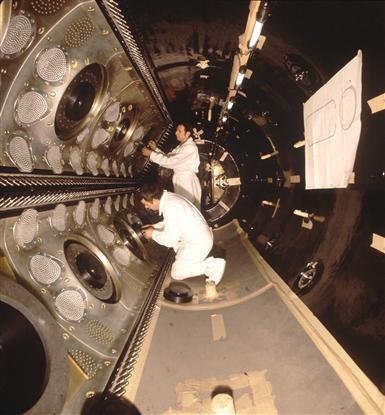
The inside of the bubble chamber. The fish-eye lenses can be seen on the walls of the chamber.

=== The chamber ===
Gargamelle was 4.8 meters long and 2 meters in diameter, and held 12 cubic meters of heavy liquid Freon. To bend the tracks of charged particles, Gargamelle was surrounded by a magnet providing a 2-tesla field. The coils of the magnet were made of copper cooled down with water, and followed the oblong shape of Gargamelle. In order to maintain the liquid at an adequate temperature, several water tubes surrounded the chamber body to regulate the temperature. The entire installation weighed more than 1000 tons.

When recording an event, the chamber was illuminated and photographed. The illumination system emitted light that was scattered at 90° by the bubbles, which was then sent to the optics. The light source consisted of 21 point flashes disposed at the ends of the chamber body and over one half of the cylinder. The optics were situated in the opposite half of the cylinder, distributed in two rows parallel to the chamber axis, each rows having four optics. The objective was made by an assembly of lenses with a 90° angular field followed by a divergent lens which extends the field to 110°.

=== The neutrino beam ===
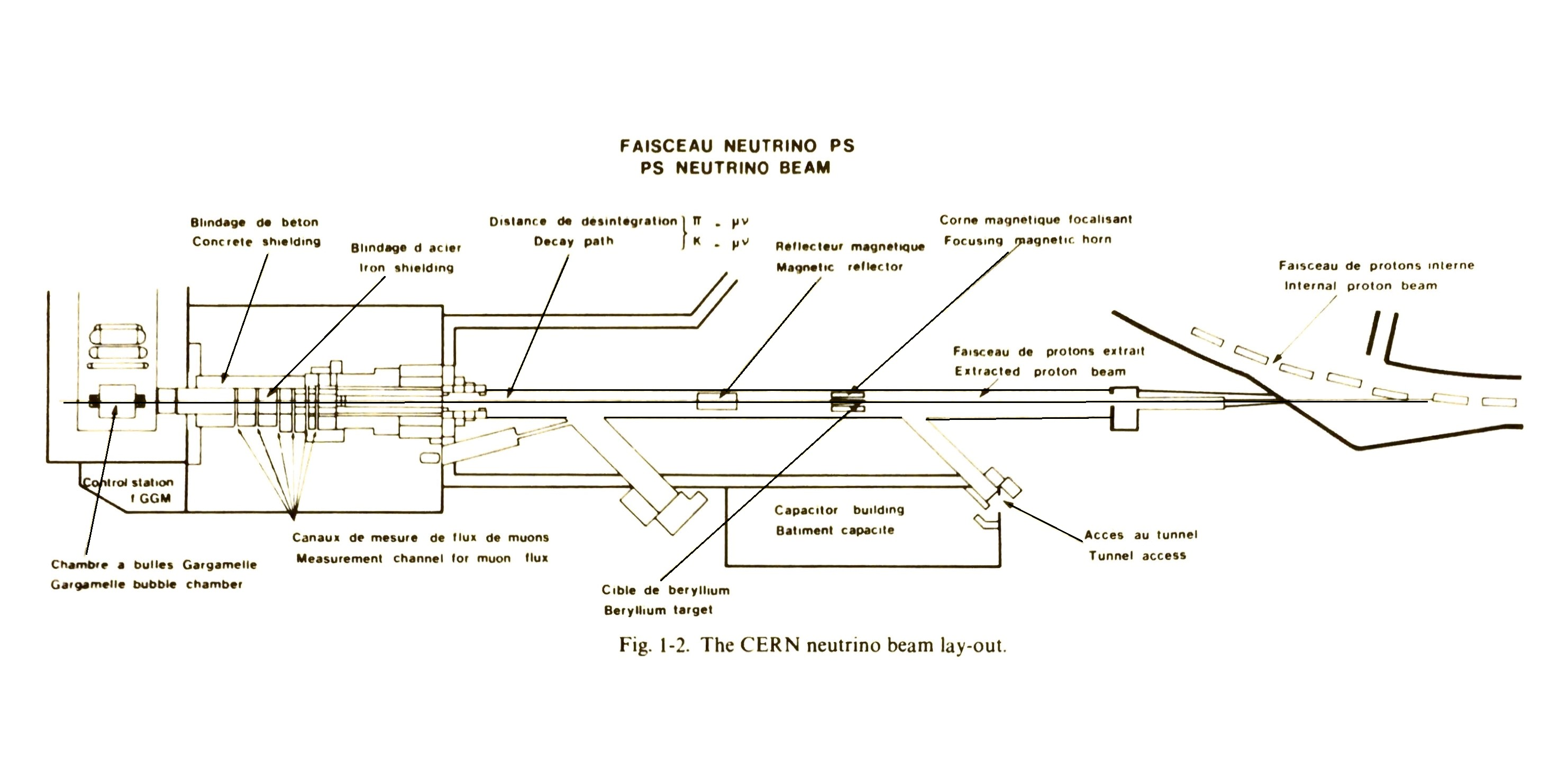
A schematic of the beam line between PS and Gargamelle bubble chamber

Gargamelle was designed for neutrino and antineutrino detection. The source of neutrinos and antineutrinos was a proton beam at an energy of 26 GeV from the PS. The protons were extracted by a magnet and then directed through an appropriate array of quadrupole and dipole magnets, providing the necessary degrees of freedom in position and orientation for adjusting the beam onto target. The target was a cylinder of beryllium, 90 cm long and 5 mm in diameter. The target material was chosen so that the hadrons produced in the collision was mainly pions and kaons, which both decay to neutrinos. The produced pions and kaons have a variety of angles and energies, and consequently their decay product will also have huge momentum spread. As neutrinos have no charge, they cannot be focused with electric or magnetic fields. Instead, one focuses the secondary particles by using a magnetic horn, invented by Nobel laureate Simon van der Meer. The shape of the horn and the strength of the magnetic field can be tuned to select a range of particles that are to be best focused, resulting in a focused neutrino beam with a chosen range of energy as the kaons and pions decay. By reversing the current through the horn, one could produce an antineutrino beam. Gargamelle ran alternately in a neutrino and an antineutrino beam. The invention of van der Meer increased the neutrino flux by a factor of 20. The neutrino beam had an energy between 1 and 10 GeV.

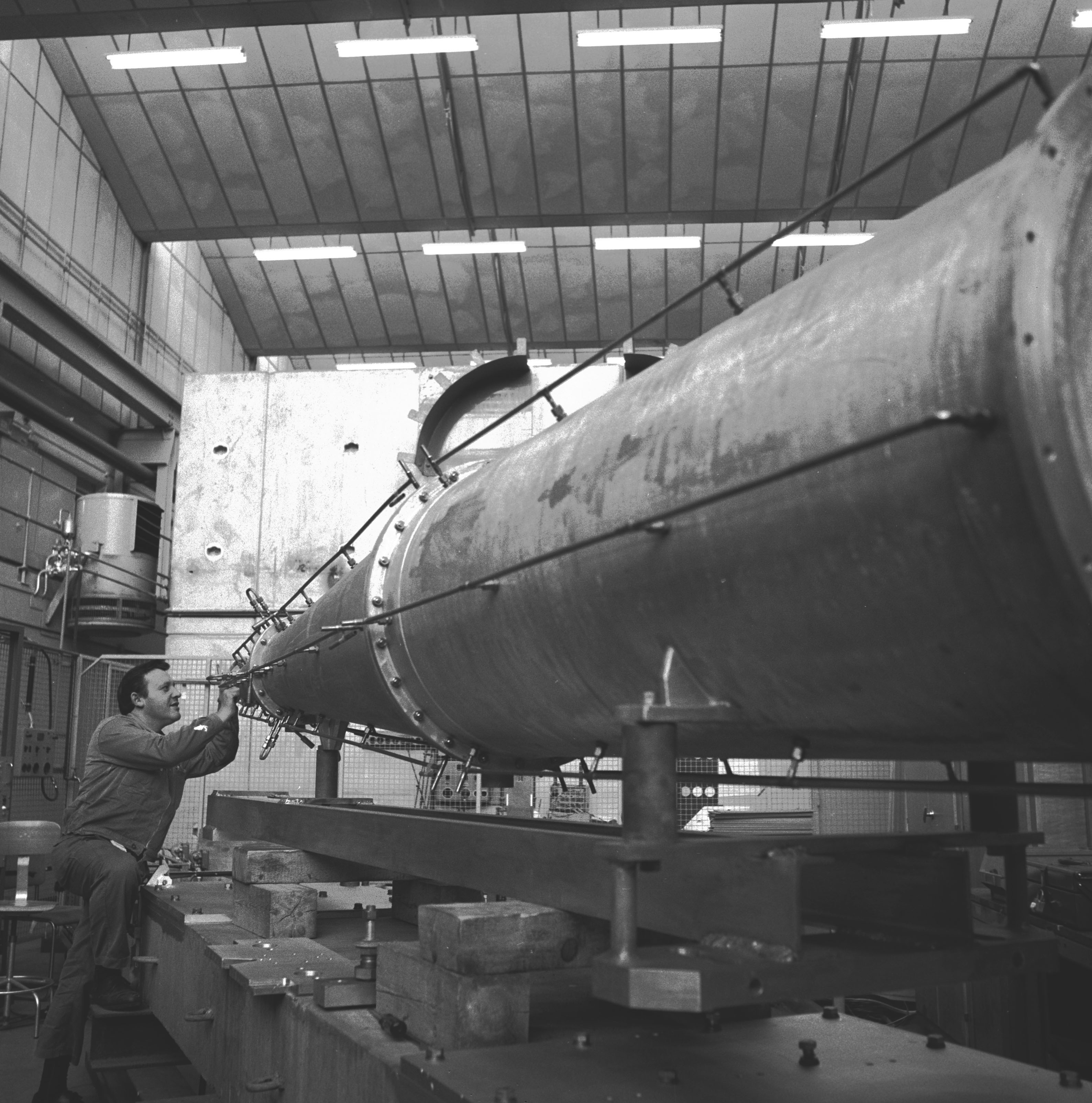
The magnetic horn of Simon van der Meer used in the neutrino beam line to Gargamelle.

After being focused, the pions and kaons were directed through a 70 m-long (230 ft) tunnel, allowing them to decay. Pions and kaons that did not decay hit a shielding in the end of the tunnel and were absorbed. When decaying, pions and kaons normally decay in π→μ + ν and K→μ + ν, meaning that the flux of neutrinos would be proportional to the flux of muons. As the muons were not absorbed as hadrons, the flux of charged muons was stopped by an electromagnetic slowing down process in the long shielding. The neutrino flux was measured through the corresponding muon flux by means of six planes of silicium-gold detectors placed at various depths in shielding.

During the years 1971-1976 large improvements factors were obtained in the intensity, first with a new injector for the PS — the Proton Synchrotron Booster — and secondly by the careful study of beam optics.

== Results and discoveries ==
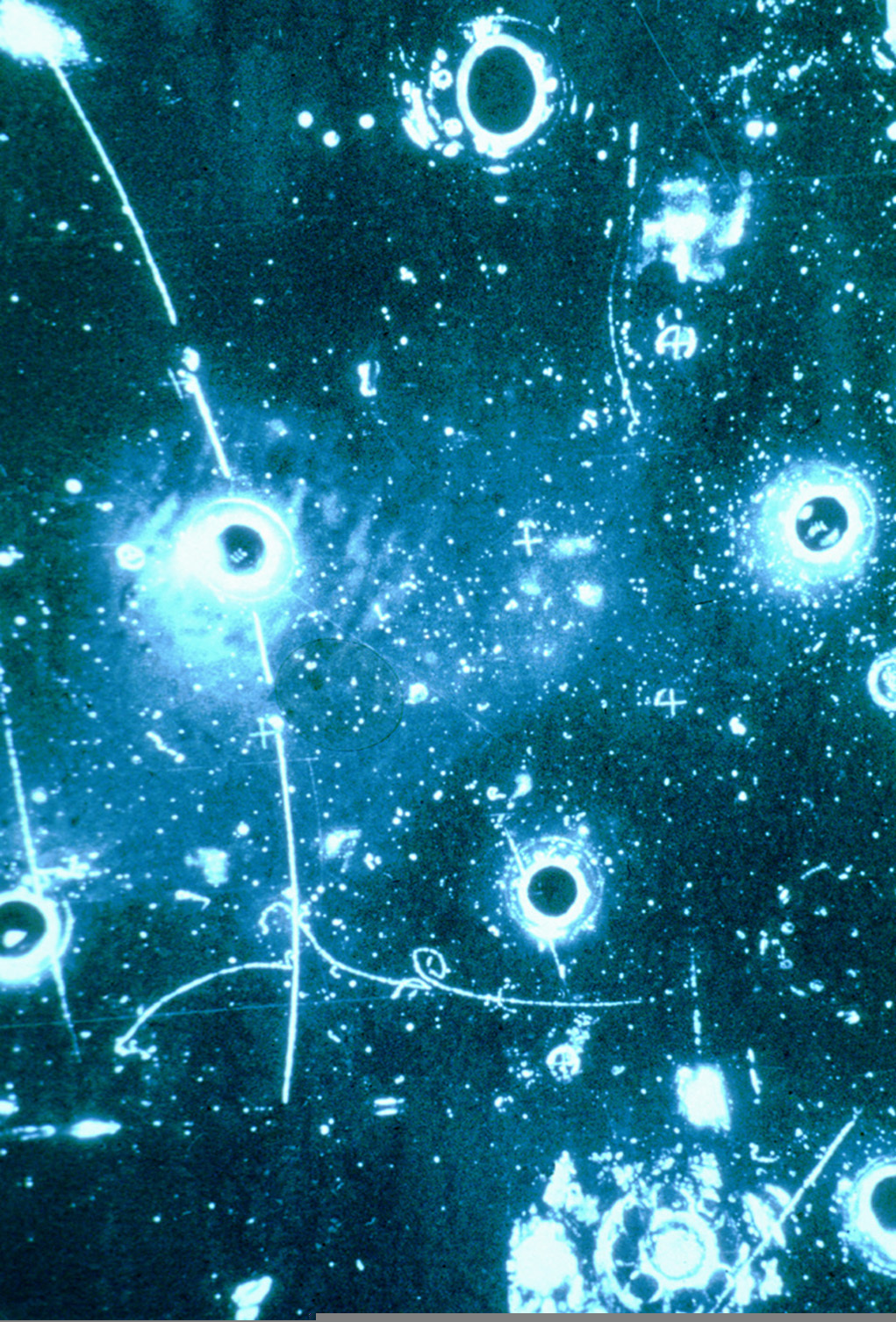
This event shows the real tracks produced in the Gargamelle bubble chamber that provided the first confirmation of a leptonic neutral current interaction. A neutrino interacts with an electron, the track of which is seen horizontally, and emerges as a neutrino without producing a muon.

The first main quest of Gargamelle was to search for evidence of hard-scattering of muon-neutrinos and antineutrinos off nucleons. The priorities changed in March 1972, when the first hints of the existence of hadronic neutral current became obvious. It was then decided to make a two-prong attack in the search for neutral current candidates. One line would search for leptonic events — events involving the interaction with an electron in the liquid, e.g. ν_{μ} + e^{−} → ν_{μ} + e^{−} or ν̅_{μ} + e^{−} → ν̅_{μ} + e^{−}. The other line would search for hadronic events — involving a neutrino scattered from a hadron, e.g. ν + p → ν + p, ν + n → ν + p + π^{−} or p → ν + n + π^{+}, plus events with many hadrons. The leptonic events have small cross-sections, but correspondingly small background. The hadronic events have larger backgrounds, most extensively due to neutrons produced when neutrinos interact in the material around the chamber. Neutrons, being of no charge, would not be detected in the bubble chamber, and the detection of their interactions would mimic neutral currents events. In order to reduce the neutron background, the energy of the hadronic events had to be greater than 1 GeV.

The first example of a leptonic event was found in December 1972 at Gargamelle by a graduate student from Aachen. By March 1973 166 hadronic events had been found, 102 events with the neutrino beam and 64 events with the antineutrino beam. However, the question of neutron background hung over the interpretation of the hadronic events. The problem was solved by studying the charged current events which also had an associated neutron interaction which satisfied the hadronic event selection. In this way one has a monitor of the neutron background flux. On the 19th of July 1973 the Gargamelle collaboration presented the discovery of neutral currents at a seminar at CERN.

The Gargamelle collaboration discovered both leptonic neutral currents — events involving the interaction of a neutrino with an electron — and hadronic neutral currents — events when a neutrino is scattered from a nucleon. The discovery was very important as it was in support of the electroweak theory, today a pillar of the Standard Model. The final experimental proof the electroweak theory came in 1983, when the UA1 and UA2 collaboration discovered the W^{±} and Z^{0} bosons.

Initially the first priority of the Gargamelle had been to measure the neutrino and antineutrino cross-sections and structure functions. The reason for this was to test the quark model of the nucleon. Firstly the neutrino and antineutrino cross-sections were shown to be linear with energy, which is what one expects for the scattering of point-like constituents in the nucleon. Combining the neutrino and antineutrino structure functions allowed the net number of quarks in the nucleon to be determined, and this was in good agreement with 3. In addition comparing the neutrino results with results from Stanford Linear Accelerator Center (SLAC) in the US, using an electron beam, one found that quarks had fractional charges, and experimentally proved the values of these charges: +2/3 e, −1/3 e. The results were published in 1975, providing crucial evidence for the existence of quarks.

In 2009, the Gargamelle Collaboration was awarded the High Energy Particle Physics Prize of the European Physical Society "for the observation of the weak neutral current interaction".

== See also ==
- Proton Synchrotron
- UA1 experiment
- UA2 experiment
- W and Z bosons
- Bubble chamber
