= Elizabeth Buckley-Geer =

Particle physicist and astrophysicist

Elizabeth Jane Buckley-Geer is a particle physicist and astrophysicist at Fermilab, where she studies gravitational lensing as a collaborator on the Dark Energy Survey and Dark Energy Spectroscopic Instrument. She is also an associate of the University of Chicago Consortium for Advanced Science and Engineering.

== Education and career ==
Buckley-Geer earned her Ph.D. in 1986 at Queen Mary University of London. She joined Fermilab in 1989.

She worked as a particle physicist at Fermilab before turning to dark energy, including experimental results on the top quark and jets as part of the Collider Detector at Fermilab, and on neutrino oscillation as part of the MINOS collaboration. She shifted her focus to dark energy in 2006.

She is a senior scientist at Fermilab, and head of Fermilab's Frameworks, DAQ and Electronics department.

== Recognition ==
In 2018 she was named a Fellow of the American Physical Society (APS), after a nomination from the APS Division of Astrophysics, "for the creation and leadership of the Dark Energy Survey Strong Lensing Group including discovery and confirmation of numerous strong lenses and multiply lensed quasars and their application to new measurements of cosmic dark matter and dark energy".
