= Magnetic horn =

Focusing device in neutrino physics

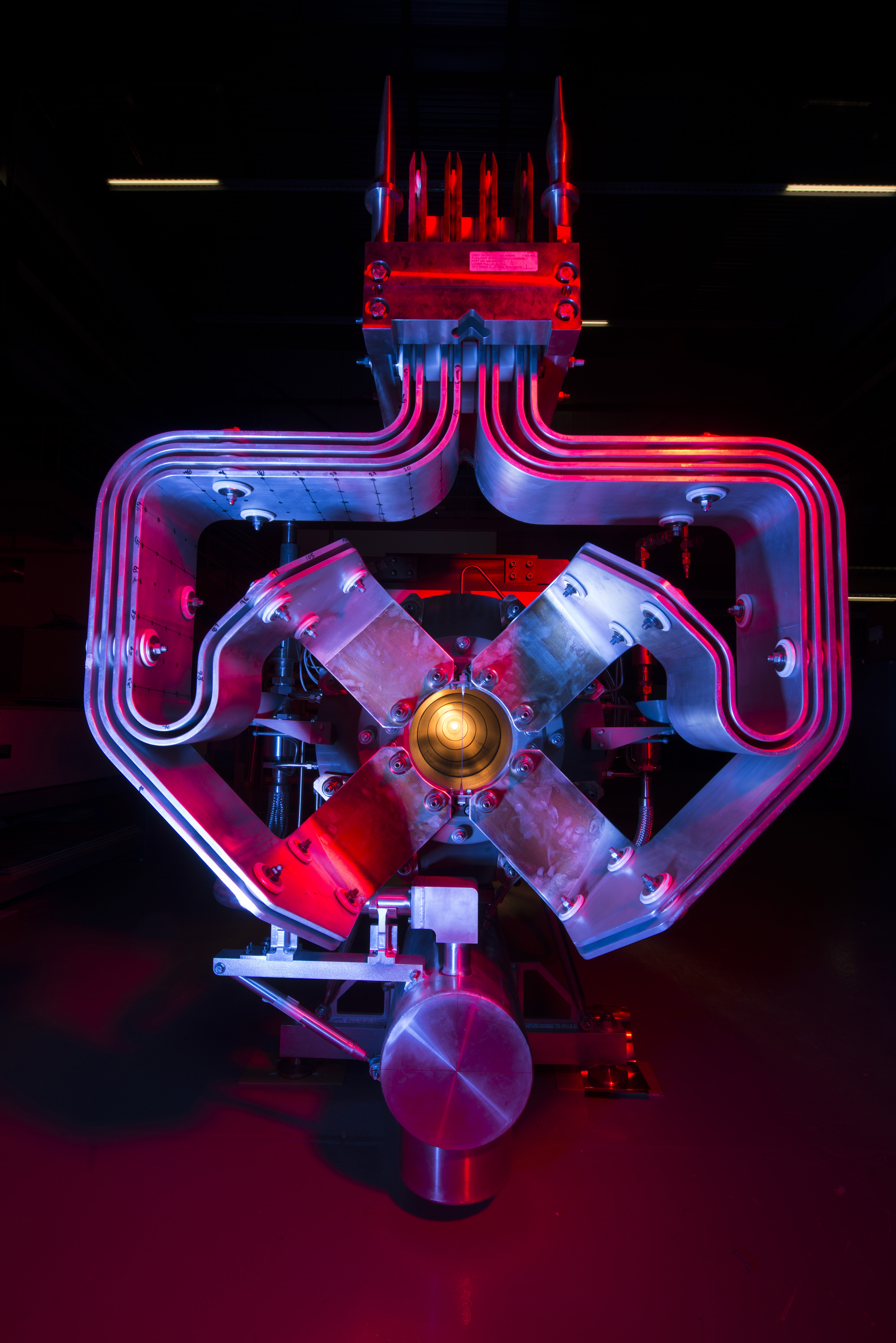
Example of magnetic horn used in NuMI neutrino beam

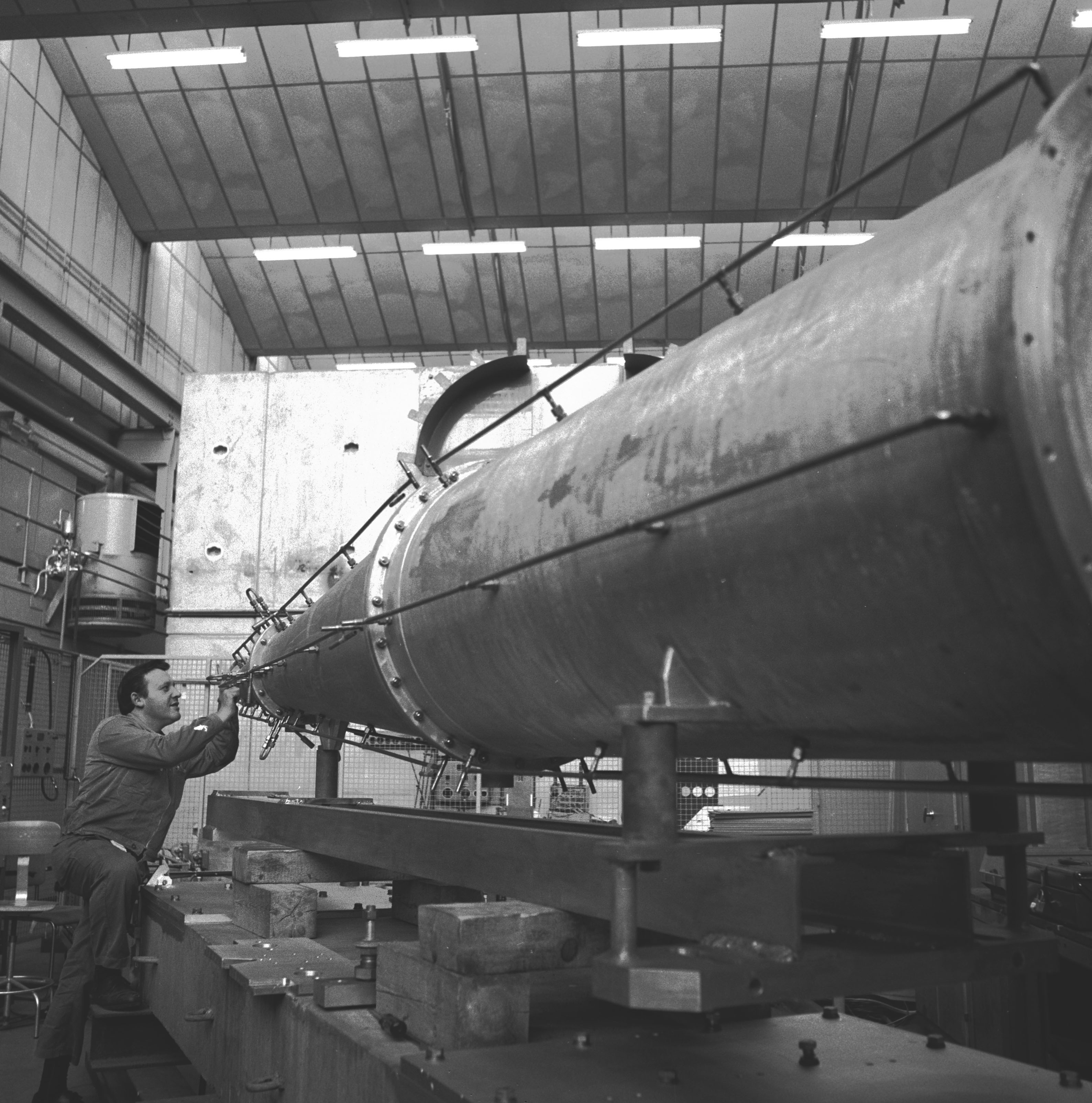
Magnetic horn using in the neutrino beam line to the Gargamelle detector at CERN

A magnetic horn or neutrino horn (also known as the Van der Meer horn) is a high-current, pulsed focusing device, invented by the Dutch physicist Simon van der Meer in CERN, that selects scattered pions and kaons and focuses them into a sharp beam. The original application of the magnetic horn was in the context of neutrino physics, where beams of pions have to be tightly focused. When the pions then decay into muons and neutrinos or antineutrinos, a focused neutrino beam is obtained.

A magnetic horn functions by using high strength pulsed currents (hundreds of kA) to produce a strong toroidal magnetic field around the proton beam, deflecting stray charged particles back inward. The toroidal field is produced by current flowing outwards through the inner conductors, then back through the outer conductors. The Lorentz force points inwards, perpendicular to the particles' velocity and the magnetic field lines going around the donut, focusing the beam.

The invention of the magnetic horn is one of the reasons (along with extraction efficiency) that neutrino beams shifted from generally using internal targets to "fast extraction" by rapidly deflecting short pulses (~10^{-6} s) of protons off the main beam to the target. The magnetic horn's size requires extraction and its use of pulsed power to provide high currents necessitates it to be fast. The short beam period can also allow detectors to reduce interference from cosmic rays by ignoring signals outside of the short period of activity.

== Description ==
Production of a neutrino beam generally involves directing protons onto a fixed target of solid material. The protons interact via the strong force with the nuclei in the target, producing a variety of secondary hadrons, including pions and kaons. The proton beam energy and target material are chosen so that these hadrons are mostly pions and kaons. Both of these particles' decays produce neutrinos. However, without a neutrino horn, the resulting neutrino beam is very wide, both geometrically (e.g. 7.5°) and in energy spread. This is because the secondary particles are produced at a variety of angles and energies and then when they decay, the neutrinos are again produced at a variety of angles and energies. Before the magnetic horn, secondaries and neutrinos were simply collected at the primary angle of deflection.

The neutrinos themselves cannot be focused with electric or magnetic fields because they are electrically neutral. Instead, one or more magnetic horns can be used to focus the secondary particles. The shape of the horn and strength of the magnetic field can be tuned to select a range of particle energies that are to be best focused. In this way, the resulting neutrino beam is both geometrically focused and given a chosen range of energies. Note however that the decays of the secondary hadrons still impart some random direction to the neutrinos, so the beam will always spread to some degree no matter how well the horn works.

== Implementation ==
The material of the conductors in magnetic horns are thin and must have low density to prevent interactions with the secondary particles they focus, but must also be strong enough to withstand the Lorentz forces and heat shock they undergo due to the high strength pulsed currents. They must also have very low resistivity. In the T2K experiment, a special alloy of aluminum called A6061-T6 is used for its high tensile strength (310 MPa to the ~70 MPa of pure aluminum) and low resistivity (4.0 * 10^{-8}, 233% of pure copper and 161% of pure aluminum). The conductors are water-cooled after each pulse due to the amount of heat generated.

The secondary particles produced by the proton beam also cause radioactivity in the gases and fluids surrounding the magnetic horn. If nitrogen (the main component of air) is present in the inside of the horn, nitrogen oxide (NO) is produced. In water-cooled systems, when the NO contacts the water it reacts to form HNO_{3} and H_{2}, acidifying the water so that it corrodes the aluminum and filling the inside of the magnetic horn with explosive hydrogen gas. This can be addressed by filling the horn with another gas, such as helium. Water-cooled systems also have to deal with radioactive water, primarily due to ^{7}Be and ^{3}H formation. The T2K experiment dealt the ^{7}Be via ion exchange and the ^{3}H by simply diluting it until it reached below-regulation levels of radioactivity.

== Notable uses ==
- The NuMI beam, used by the MINOS, NOνA and MINERνA experiments, uses 2 magnetic horns to produce a 3GeV muon neutrino beam.
- The Gargamelle bubble chamber, in which the first neutral current reactions were observed, used a 20GeV muon anti-neutrino beam focused by a single horn.
