= André Lagarrigue =

French physicist (1924–1975)

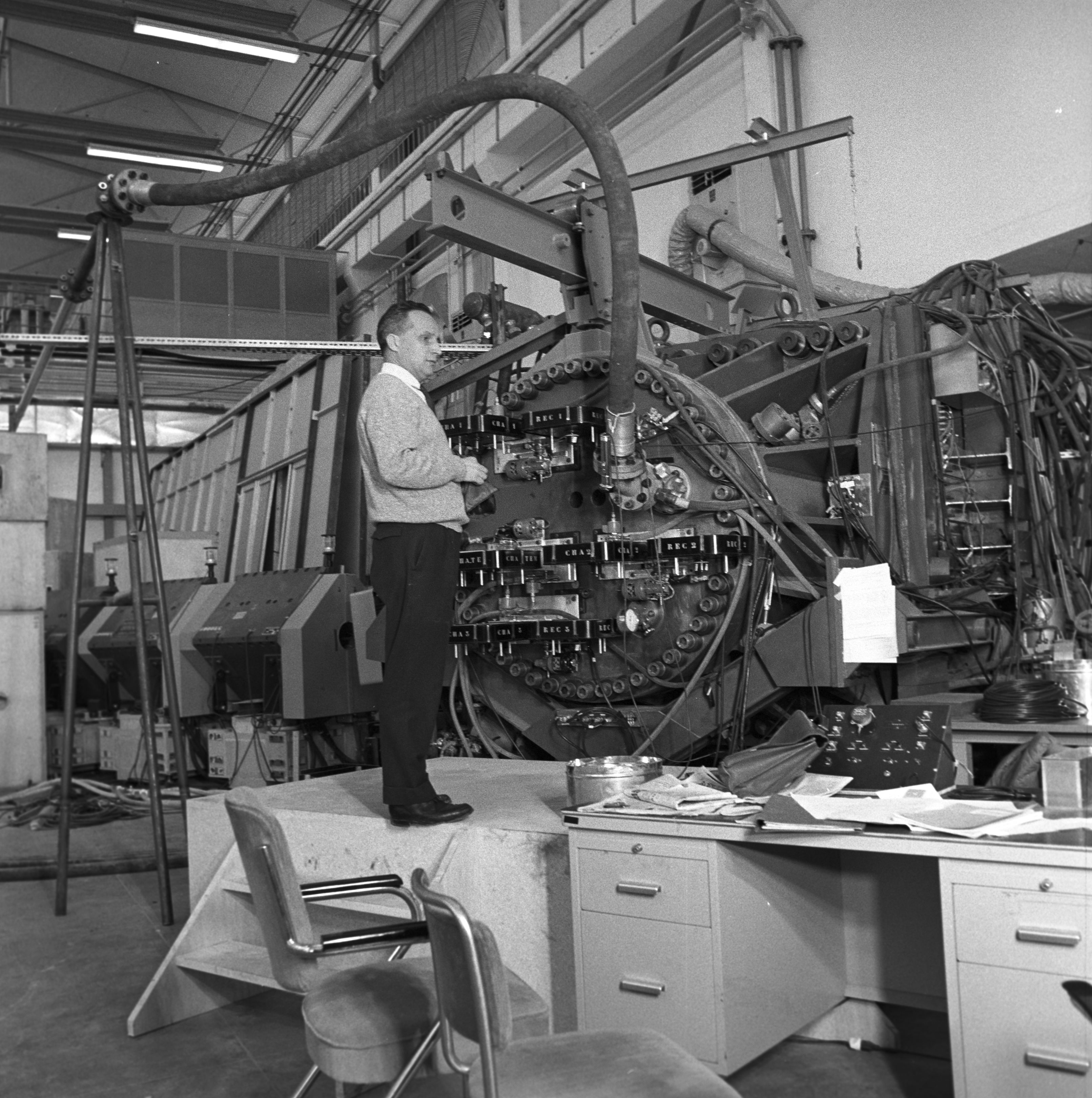
- Born: 1924; Aurillac, France
- Died: 14 January 1975 (aged 50–51); Orsay, France
- Known for: Initiator of the Gargamelle experiment, where neutral currents were discovered in 1973
- Scientific career
- Fields: Particle physics
- Workplaces: CERN; École Polytechnique; Orsay LAL

André Lagarrigue (1924 – 14 January 1975) was a French particle physicist. Being the initiator of the Gargamelle experiment at CERN, his work was of paramount importance in the discovery of neutral currents — the first experimental indication of the existence of the Z^{0} boson. This major discovery was a step towards verification of the electroweak theory, today a pillar of the Standard Model.

== Career and research ==
Born in Aurillac, France, André Lagarrigue was admitted to École Polytechnique in Paris in 1945, specializing in the field of weapons engineering. However, while still a student at École Polytechnique he was attracted to the field of experimental physics, and participated in an experiment designed to determine the mass of the muon using a cloud chamber. In 1952 he achieved a doctorate from the Sorbonne University on the experimental properties of muon decay. Between 1954 and 1955 he spent a sabbatical year at Berkeley, where he learnt of the experimental possibilities using particle accelerators such as the Bevatron. After his return to France and École Polytechnique, he turned his focus towards bubble chambers, becoming renowned for his work on heavy liquid bubble chambers in a time when most physicist worked with hydrogen bubble chambers. Hydrogen bubble chambers would provide a pure proton target and consequently better measurements. The heavy liquid bubble chambers would however be cheaper and provide a high density of the target, suitable for neutrino detection, since neutrinos have a very small cross-section.

Together with collaborators he constructed several heavy liquid bubble chambers at École Polytechnique. The first chamber built was called BP1, a propane bubble chamber of 1 liter. They first used scattering at small angles, from light coming from the back of the chamber. They then tried to use side illumination at 90°, like in a cloud chamber. This method turned out to be efficient, and was later used in the Gargamelle experiment. A second, bigger chamber, BP2, built for experiments at Saclay, contained 20 liters of a mixture of propane and methyl iodide. He went on to develop BP3.

After attending a conference in 1963, on the newest developments in the field of neutrino physics, Lagarrigue came up with the idea to construct a heavy liquid chamber for detection of neutrinos — an idea that would earn him the nickname father of Gargamelle. He wrote the first published proposal for Gargamelle, dated 10 February 1964, and gathered a collaboration consisting of seven laboratories: École Polytechnique Paris, RWTH Aachen, ULB Bruxelles, Istituto di Fisica dell'Università di Milano, LAL Orsay, University College London and CERN. During the next years he led the collaboration to many important discoveries, amongst others that of the neutral currents in both leptonic and hadronic events, and the experimental proof of the fractional charges of the quarks. Gargamelle turned out to be one of the most significant experiments in the history of CERN.

In 1964 he became professor at the University of Orsay. In 1969 he became director of Orsay Linear Accelerator Laboratory, a position he held until his untimely death in 1975. Lagarrigue died of a heart attack, while leaving one of his courses at the University of Orsay.

== Awards and honors ==
- In 1975 Lagarrigue was the second recipient of the Prize Ampère, awarded annually by the French Academy of Sciences.
- A prize named in Lagarrigue's honor, The André Lagarrigue Prize, issued by the French Physics Society on the occasion of the 50th jubilee of Orsay Linear Accelerator Laboratory, is awarded annually to a senior experimental physicist working in France.
- An auditorium at École Polytechnique in Paris is named in his honor.
- Lagarrigue has a street named after him at CERN, in the Prévessin site, and a square in the Meyrin site
