= NOvA =

NOvA Neutrino Experiment
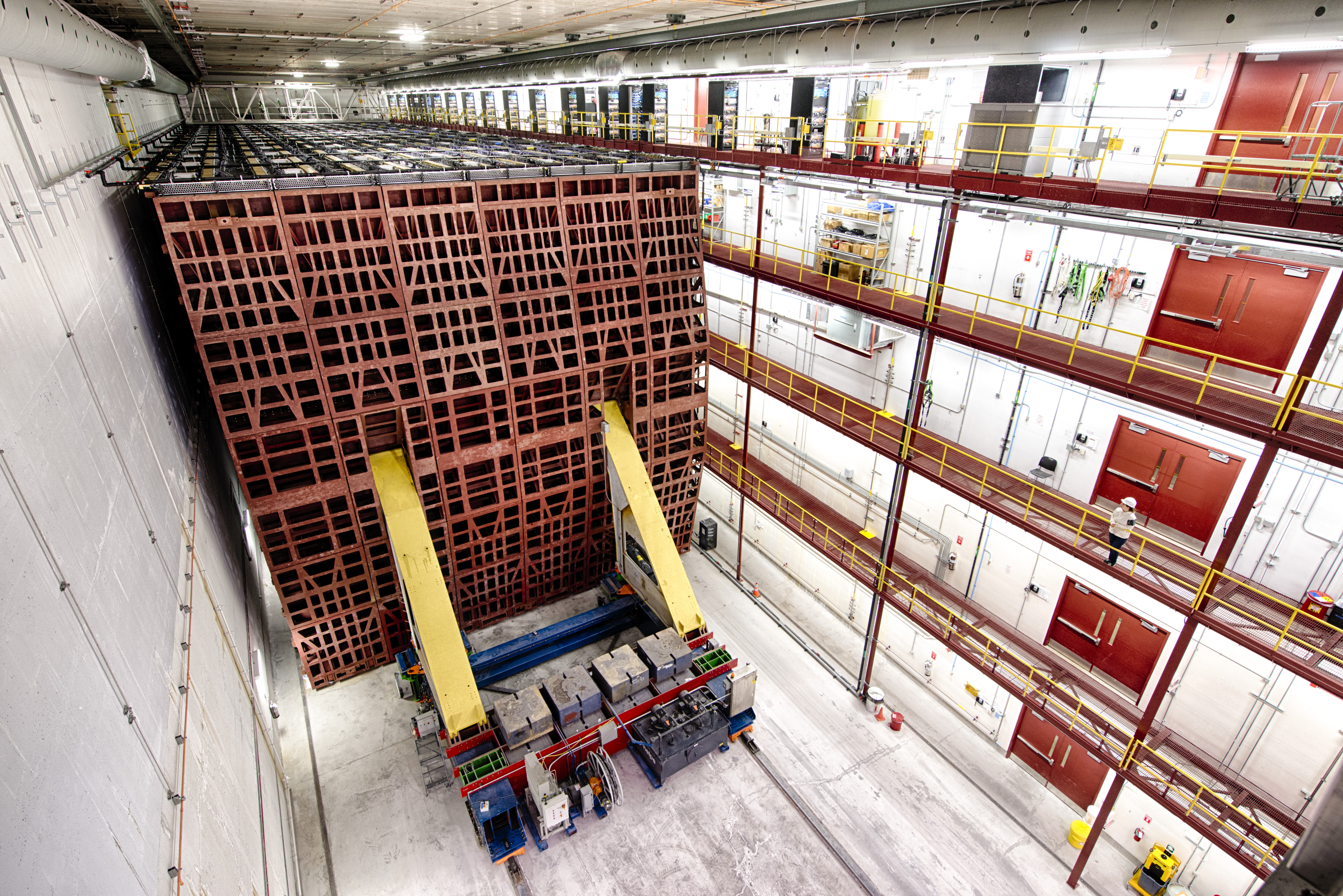
- Photo of the NOvA Far Detector
- Organization: NOvA collaboration
- Location: Ash River, Minnesota, United States
- Coordinates: 48°22′45″N 92°50′1″W
- Website: novaexperiment.fnal.gov
- Related media on Commons

A comparison of the NOνA far and near detectors with the size of an Airbus A380.

The NOνA (NuMI Off-Axis ν_{e} Appearance) experiment is a particle physics experiment designed to detect neutrinos in Fermilab's NuMI (Neutrinos at the Main Injector) beam. Intended to be the successor to MINOS, NOνA consists of two detectors, one at Fermilab (the near detector), and one in northern Minnesota (the far detector). Neutrinos from NuMI pass through 810 km of Earth to reach the far detector. NOνA's main goal is to observe the oscillation of muon neutrinos to electron neutrinos. The primary physics goals of NOvA are:

- Precise measurement, for neutrinos and antineutrinos, of the mixing angle θ_{23}, especially whether it is larger than, smaller than, or equal to 45°
- Precise measurement, for neutrinos and antineutrinos, of the associated mass splitting Δm^{2}_{32}
- Strong constraints on the CP-violating phase δ
- Strong constraints on the neutrino mass hierarchy

== Physics goals ==
=== Primary goals ===
Neutrino oscillation is parameterized by the PMNS matrix and the mass squared differences between the neutrino mass eigenstates. Assuming that three flavors of neutrinos participate in neutrino mixing, there are six variables that affect neutrino oscillation: the three angles θ_{12}, θ_{23}, and θ_{13}, a CP-violating phase δ, and any two of the three mass squared differences. There is currently no compelling theoretical reason to expect any particular value of, or relationship between, these parameters.

θ_{23} and θ_{12} have been measured to be non-zero by several experiments but the most sensitive search for non-zero θ_{13} by the Chooz collaboration yielded only an upper limit. In 2012, θ_{13} was measured at Daya Bay to be non-zero to a statistical significance of 5.2 σ. The following year, T2K discovered the transition $\ \nu_{\mu}\rightarrow\nu_{e}\$ excluding the non-appearance hypothesis with a significance of 7.3 σ. No measurement of δ has been made. The absolute values of two mass squared differences are known, but because one is very small compared to the other, the ordering of the masses has not been determined.

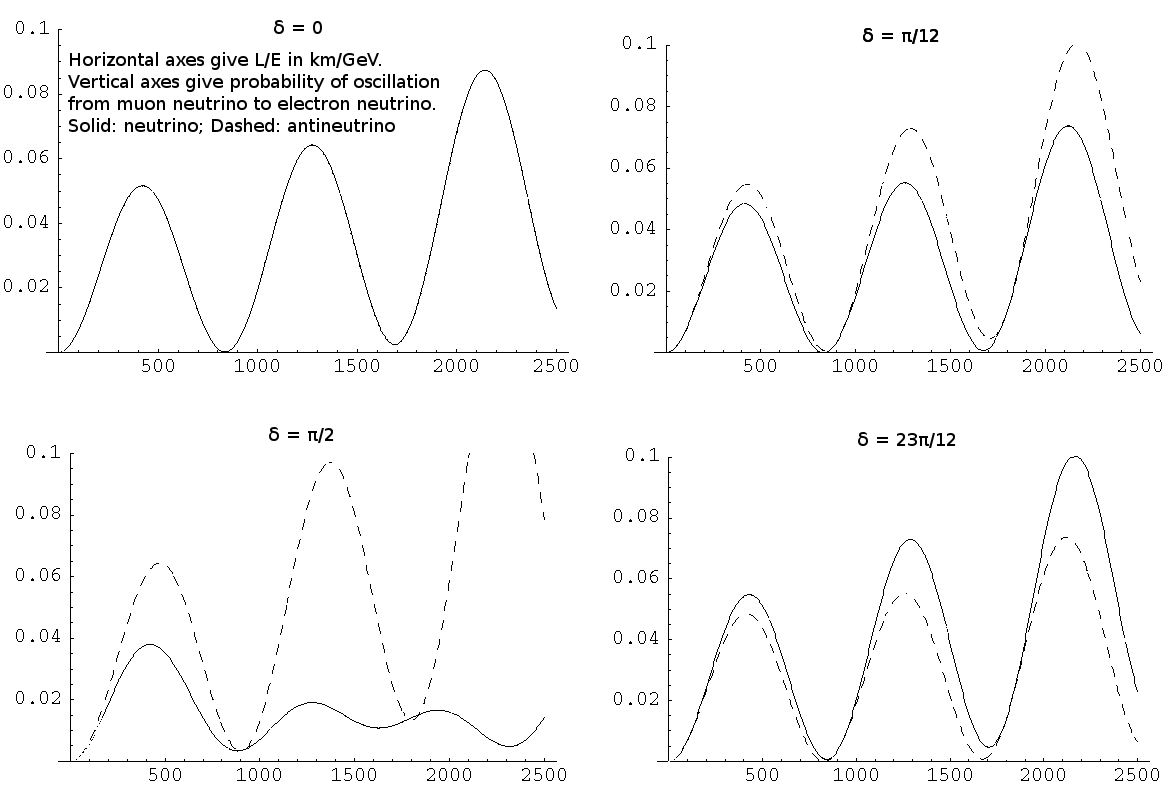
Oscillation probabilities, ignoring matter effects and assuming θ_{13} is near the current limit. NOνA will observe the first peak.

NOνA is an order of magnitude more sensitive to θ_{13} than the previous generation of experiments, such as MINOS. It will measure it by searching for the transition $\nu_{\mu}\rightarrow\nu_{e}$ in the Fermilab NuMI beam. If a non-zero value of θ_{13} is resolvable by NOνA, it will be possible to obtain measurements of δ and the mass ordering by also observing $\ \bar{\nu}_{\mu}\rightarrow\bar{\nu}_{e} ~.$ The parameter δ can be measured because it modifies the probabilities of oscillation differently for neutrinos and anti-neutrinos. The mass ordering, similarly, can be determined because the neutrinos pass through the Earth, which, through the MSW effect, modifies the probabilities of oscillation differently for neutrinos and anti-neutrinos.

=== Importance ===
The neutrino masses and mixing angles are, to the best of our knowledge, fundamental constants of the universe. Measuring them is a basic requirement for our understanding of physics. Knowing the value of the CP violating parameter δ will help us understand why the universe has a matter-antimatter asymmetry. Also, according to the Seesaw mechanism theory, the very small masses of neutrinos may be related to very large masses of particles that we do not yet have the technology to study directly. Neutrino measurements are then an indirect way of studying physics at extremely high energies.

In our current theory of physics, there is no reason why the neutrino mixing angles should have any particular values. And yet, of the three neutrino mixing angles, only θ_{12} has been resolved as being neither maximal or minimal. If the measurements of NOνA and other future experiments continue to show θ_{23} as maximal and θ_{13} as minimal, it may suggest some as yet unknown symmetry of nature.

=== Relationship to other experiments ===
NOνA can potentially resolve the mass hierarchy because it operates at a relatively high energy. Of the experiments currently running it has the broadest scope for making this measurement unambiguously with least dependence on the value of δ. Many future experiments that seek to make precision measurements of neutrino properties will rely on NOνA's measurement to know how to configure their apparatus for greatest accuracy, and how to interpret their results.

An experiment similar to NOνA is T2K, a neutrino beam experiment in Japan similar to NOνA. Like NOνA, it is intended to measure θ_{13} and δ. It will have a 295 km baseline and will use lower energy neutrinos than NOνA, about 0.6 GeV. Since matter effects are less pronounced both at lower energies and shorter baselines, it is unable to resolve the mass ordering for the majority of possible values of δ.

The interpretation of Neutrinoless double beta decay experiments will also benefit from knowing the mass ordering, since the mass hierarchy affects the theoretical lifetimes of this process.

Reactor experiments also have the ability to measure θ_{13}. While they cannot measure δ or the mass ordering, their measurement of the mixing angle is not dependent on knowledge of these parameters. The three experiments that have measured a value for θ_{13}, in deceasing order of sensitivity are Daya Bay in China, RENO in South Korea and Double Chooz in France, which use 1–2 km baselines, optimized for observation of the first θ_{13} controlled oscillation maximum.

=== Secondary goals ===
In addition to its primary physics goals, NOνA will be able to improve upon the measurements of the previously measured oscillation parameters. NOνA, like MINOS, is capable of detecting muon neutrinos and so will be able to increase our knowledge of θ_{23}.

The NOνA near detector is used to conduct measurements of neutrino interaction cross sections which are currently not known to a high degree of precision. Its measurements in this area complement other similar upcoming experiments, such as MINERνA, which also uses the NuMI beam.

Since it is capable of detecting neutrinos from galactic supernovas, NOνA is part of the Supernova Early Warning System. Supernova data from NOνA can be correlated with that from Super-Kamiokande to study the matter effects on the oscillation of these neutrinos.

== Design ==
To accomplish its physics goals, NOνA needs to be efficient at detecting electron neutrinos, which are expected to appear in the NuMI beam (originally made only of muon neutrinos) as the result of neutrino oscillation.

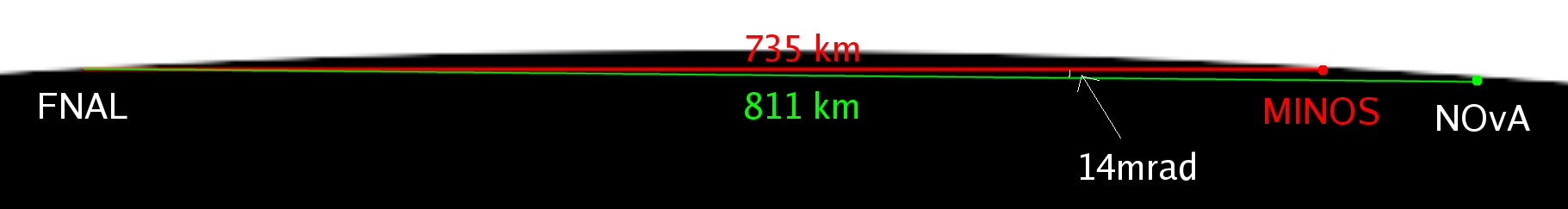
Cross section of the earth showing Fermilab, MINOS and NOνA, to scale. The red line is the central axis of the NuMI beam.

Previous neutrino experiments, such as MINOS, have reduced backgrounds from cosmic rays by being underground. However, NOνA is on the surface and relies on precise timing information and a well-defined beam energy to reduce spurious background counts. It is situated 810 km from the origin of the NuMI beam and 14 milliradians (12 km) west of the beam's central axis. In this position, it samples a beam that has a much narrower energy distribution than if it were centrally located, further reducing the effect of backgrounds.

The detector is designed as a pair of finely grained liquid scintillator detectors. The far detector, located in northern Minnesota, consists of about 500,000 cells, each 4 cm × 6 cm × 16 m, filled with liquid scintillator. Scintillation light is captured by optical fibers made of wavelength shifter, both ends of which lead to an avalanche photodiode for readout.

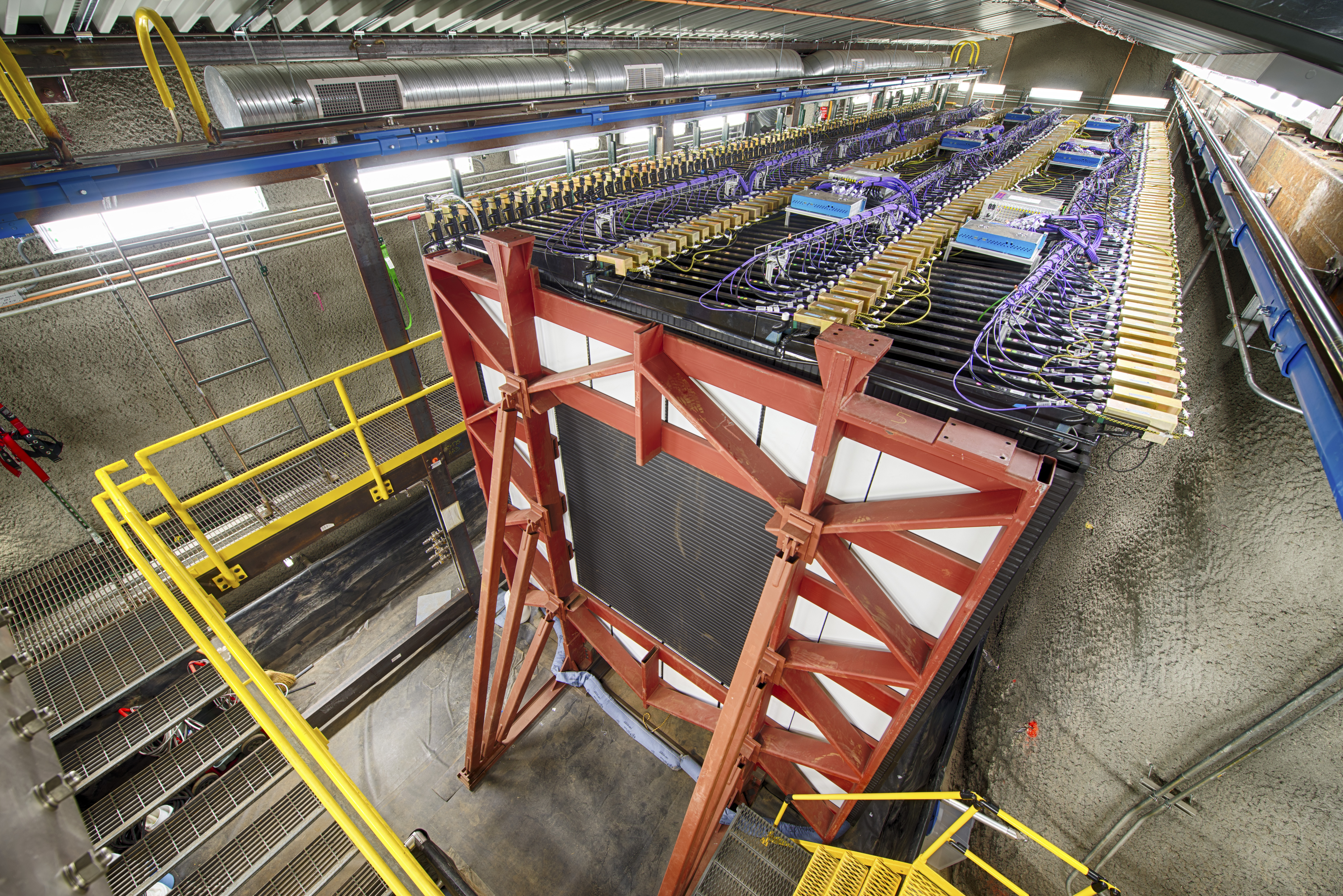
The NOνA near detector. (More figures at Fermilab)

The near detector at Fermilab, which measured the unoscillated neutrino beam, has the same general design s the far detector, and is about 1/ 200 as massive. This 222 ton detector is constructed of 186 planes of scintillator-filled cells (6 blocks of 31 planes) followed by a muon catcher. Although all the planes are identical, the first 6 are used as a veto region; particle showers which begin in them are assumed to not be neutrinos and ignored. The next 108 planes serve as the fiducial region; particle showers beginning in them are neutrino interactions of interest. The final 72 planes are a "shower containment region" which observe the trailing portion of particle showers which began in the fiducial region. Finally, a 1.7 meter long "muon catcher" region is constructed of steel plates interleaved with 10 active planes of liquid scintillator.

== Collaboration ==
The NOνA experiment includes scientists from a large number of institutions. Different institutions take on different tasks. The collaboration, and subgroups thereof, meets regularly via phone for weekly meetings, and in person several times a year. Participating institutions as of May 2024 are:

- Argonne National Laboratory
- Universidad del Atlantico
- Banaras Hindu University
- California Institute of Technology
- Cochin University of Science and Technology
- Institute of Computer Science of the Academy of Sciences of the Czech Republic
- Institute of Physics of the Academy of Sciences of the Czech Republic
- Charles University in Prague, Faculty of Mathematics and Physics, Institute of Particle and Nuclear Physics
- University of Cincinnati
- Colorado State University
- Czech Technical University
- University of Delhi
- Joint Institute For Nuclear Research, Dubna
- Erciyes University
- Fermi National Accelerator Laboratory
- Universidade Federal de Goias
- Florida State University
- Indian Institute of Technology Guwahati
- Harvard University
- University of Houston
- Indian Institute of Technology Hyderabad
- University of Hyderabad
- Illinois Institute of Technology
- Indiana University
- University of Iowa
- Iowa State University
- University of California, Irvine
- University College London
- Universidad del Magdalena
- Michigan State University
- University of Minnesota, Duluth
- University of Minnesota, Twin Cities
- University of Mississippi
- National Institute of Science Education and Research, Bhubaneswar, India
- Institute for Nuclear Research, Moscow
- Panjab University
- University of Pittsburgh
- Queen Mary University of London
- University of South Alabama
- University of South Carolina, Columbia
- Southern Methodist University
- Stanford University
- University of Sussex
- Syracuse University
- University of Texas, Austin
- Tufts University
- University of Virginia, Charlottesville
- Wichita State University
- The College of William and Mary
- University of Wisconsin–Madison

== Funding history ==
In late 2007, NOνA passed a Department of Energy "Critical Decision 2" review, meaning roughly that its design, cost, schedule, and scientific goals had been approved. This also allowed the project to be included in the Department of Energy congressional budget request. (NOνA still required a "Critical Decision 3" review to begin construction.)

On 21 December 2007, President Bush signed an omnibus spending bill, H.R. 2764, which cut the funding for high energy physics by 88 million dollars from the expected value of 782 million dollars. The budget of Fermilab was cut by 52 million dollars. This bill explicitly stated that "Within funding for Proton Accelerator-Based Physics, no funds are provided for the NOνA activity in Tevatron Complex Improvements." So although the NOνA project retained its approval from both the Department of Energy and Fermilab, Congress left NOνA with no funds for the 2008 fiscal year to build its detector, pay its staff, or to continue in the pursuit of scientific results. However, in July 2008, Congress passed, and the President signed, a supplemental budget bill, which included funding for NOνA, allowing the collaboration to resume its work.

The NOνA prototype near detector (Near Detector on Surface, or NDOS) began running at Fermilab in November and registered its first neutrinos from the NuMI beam on 15 December 2010. As a prototype, NDOS served the collaboration well in establishing a use case and suggesting improvements in the design of detector components that were later installed as a near detector at Fermilab, and a far detector at Ash River, MN (48.37912°N 92.83164°W).

Once construction of the NOνA building was complete, construction of the detector modules began. On 26 July 2012 the first module was laid in place. Placement and gluing of the modules continued over a year until the detector hall was filled.

The first detection occurred on 11 February 2014 and construction completed in September that year. Full operation began in October 2014.
