= MINERνA =

Neutrino scattering experiment at Fermilab in Illinois, USA

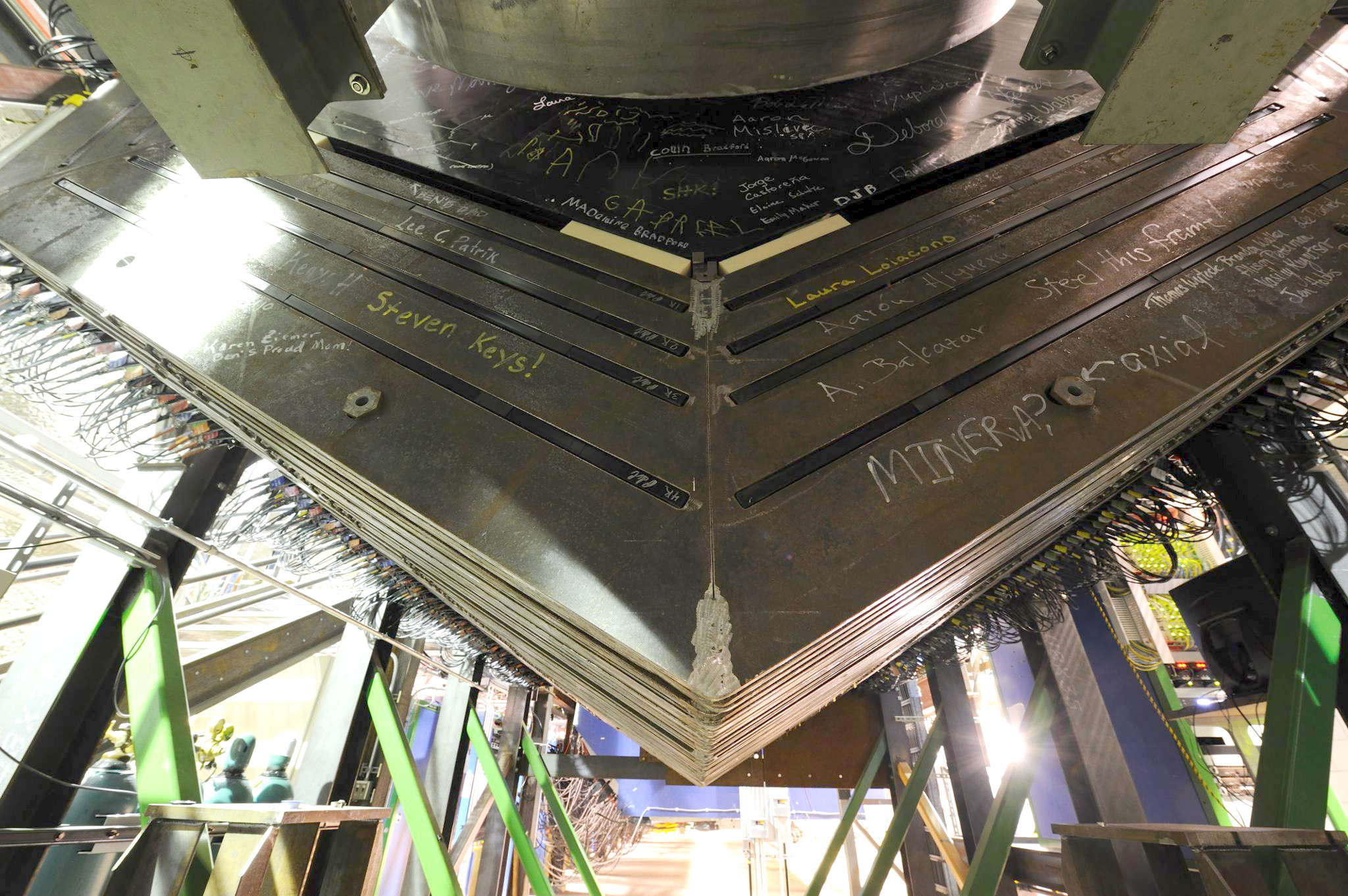
- Underside of the front of the MINERνA neutrino detector in 2011. The names of experiment contributors are handwritten on the front of the detector.
- Location(s): Fermi National Accelerator Laboratory, Illinois
- Coordinates: 41°50′23″N 88°16′13″W
- Website: https://minerva.fnal.gov
- Location of MINERνA

Main Injector Experiment for ν-A, or MINERνA, is a neutrino scattering experiment which uses the NuMI beamline at Fermilab. MINERνA seeks to measure low energy neutrino interactions both in support of neutrino oscillation experiments and also to study the strong dynamics of the nucleon and nucleus that affect these interactions.

== Name ==
MINERvA's name combines several things. "MI" stands for the Main Injector, a Fermilab accelerator that provides high-energy protons which are targeted to create the neutrino beam. "NER" comes from "Neutrino ExpeRiment." The conventional symbol for the neutrino is the Greek letter nu, which resembles a lowercase "v". Finally, "A" represents the mass number of the target material. MINERvA studies neutrino interactions with several materials, in particular helium, carbon, iron or lead, each having a different value of A.

Physicists describe these interactions where a neutrino collides with a nucleus as a "nu-A interaction," but spell MINERvA with a Roman "v" and pronounce it with a "v". The name also evokes Minerva, the Roman goddess of wisdom.

== Status ==
The experiment that became MINERvA was proposed to Fermilab by two separate groups in 2002. MINERvA's detector was assembled 107 meters underground, in a portion of the same hall that housed the Near Detector of the MINOS experiment. The first detector module was completed in early 2006, and the first events were observed by the partially assembled detector in April 2009. MINERvA started taking data regularly in November 2009 with a partially complete detector, and started taking data with the full detector in March 2010.

At times, the NuMI beamline would provide either neutrino or antineutrino beams, tuned to particular energies. MINERvA acquired data in both a low energy (peaked at ~2.5 GeV) tune and a medium energy (peaked at ~6 GeV) tune. The physics run was completed in February 2019. Years of data analysis have followed.

Approximately 65 scientists collaborate on MINERvA. As of 2022, 51 students had earned their Ph.D.s for MINERvA-related work, and 32 students had earned Master's Degrees. The scientific co-spokespersons of the MINERvA experiment are Prof. Richard Gran of University of Minnesota Duluth and Prof. Deborah Harris of York University. Past spokespeople have been Prof. Laura Fields of University of Notre Dame, Prof. Kevin McFarland of University of Rochester, and Jorge Morfin of Fermilab

== Detector ==
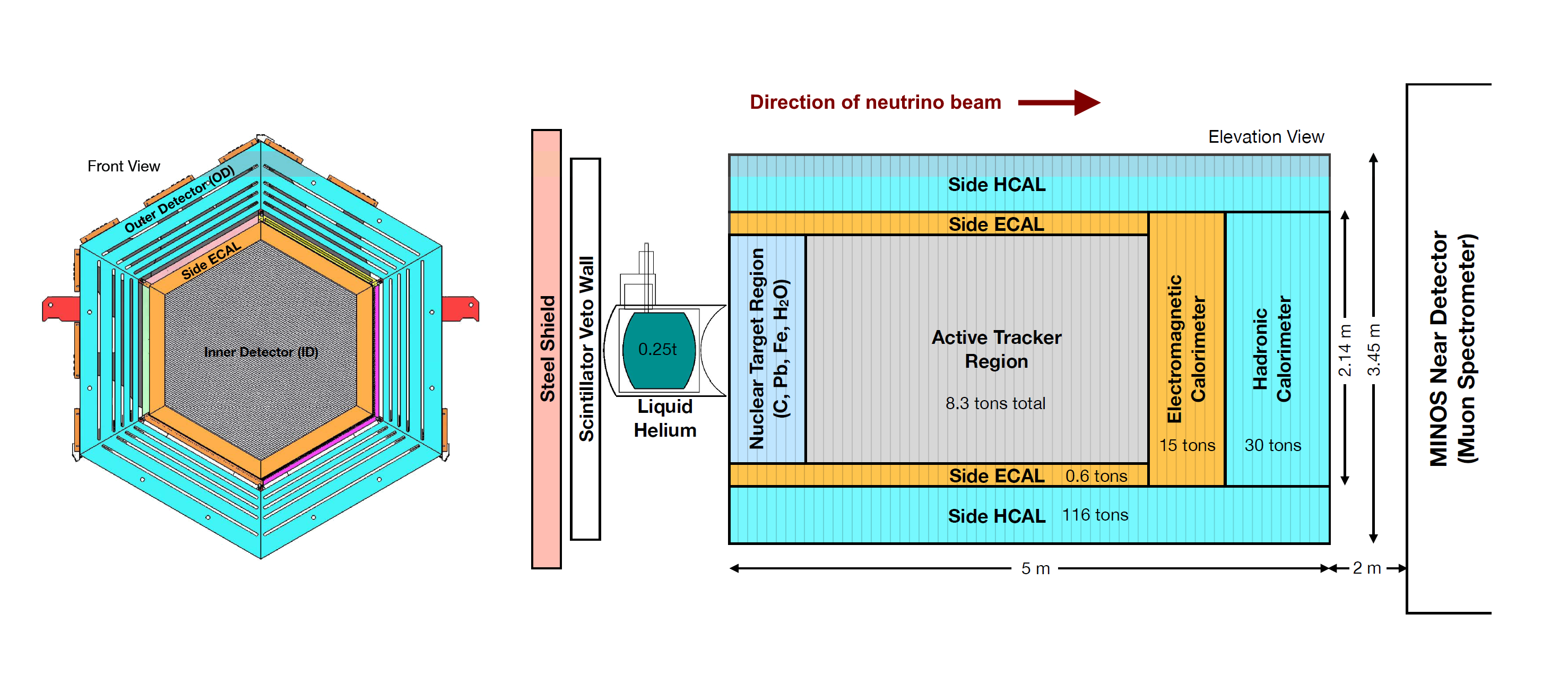
Diagram of neutrino detector in the MINERvA experiment. Left, front view of a single detector module. Right, elevation view of complete detector.

The detector used for the MINERνA experiment is made of many layers of parallel scintillator strips. Each strip is connected to a photomultiplier tube which is used to detect the amount of energy deposited into the strip. The orientation of the strips varies from layer to layer so that three-dimensional information about where particles interact with the strip can be determined. The detector consists of a middle region, the active tracker, which is made of just the scintillator strips, and is surrounded by scintillator strips interspersed with lead and iron absorbers to provide surrounding calorimetry. Upstream of the active tracker is a nuclear target region of scintillator strips in which passive targets of liquid helium, carbon, water, iron, and lead are interspersed in order to allow comparisons of interactions of neutrinos in different materials.

== Scientific Results ==
MINERvA has published results on a wide variety of topics related to neutrino interactions and on other aspects of accelerator neutrino experiments.

=== Neutrino Flux Measurements ===
In order to measure neutrino interaction probabilities, MINERvA has needed to precisely understand the flux of incoming neutrinos. Through techniques such as studying the precisely predicted but rare interactions of neutrinos on atomic electrons, improving the simulation of the production of neutrinos in the beamline, and studying the most elastic interactions of neutrinos, MINERvA has been able to predict its flux with a fractional uncertainty of approximately 4%. MINERvA's techniques provide a proof of principle for applications expected to result in higher precision in future experiments.

=== Charged-Current Quasielastic-like Reactions ===
MINERvA has extensively studied charged-current quasielastic-like reactions. In such reactions, one or more nucleons are knocked out of a nucleus by a neutrino as the muon neutrino or muon antineutrino is transformed into a muon or antimuon. MINERvA's first scientific results measured the rate of these processes in correlation with the visible energy from knocked-out protons. They suggested that about 20% of the quasielastic-like rate on carbon was from events in which multiple nucleons were ejected. This technique—correlating the observed muon either with the total observed energy, or with an individual proton or neutron—has allowed MINERvA to infer the rate of these multinucleon processes and also to measure details of the momentum and energy of the target nucleon before it is struck.

=== Production of Pions and Kaons ===
MINERvA has also measured production of charged and neutral pions in both neutrino and antineutrino scattering. One of the main conclusions of that work is that the production of pions from nuclei appears to be suppressed in low-momentum transfer reactions. MINERvA has also precisely measured a rare process, coherent pion production, which involves scattering off the entire nucleus, leaving it intact.

MINERvA has studied production of charged kaons, a process that is an important background to searches for proton decay. MINERvA was also the first experiment to observe coherent kaon production.

=== Nuclear Dependence of Neutrino Interactions ===
MINERvA has used its passive nuclear targets to compare reactions on different nuclei in inclusive scattering and in deep inelastic scattering. Work in pre-publication form as of 2022 has expanded these comparisons to include quasielastic scattering and charged pion production.

This recent data provides evidence that the low-momentum transfer suppression of the reaction occurs in many nuclei. They show the effect of intranuclear rescattering increasing as expected in heavier nuclei.

=== Interactions of Electron Neutrinos compared to Muon Neutrinos ===
Using the 1% contamination of electron neutrinos in the neutrino beam, MINERvA has measured quasielastic-like scattering of electron neutrinos. Differences between muon neutrino and electron neutrino interactions would significantly impact present and future oscillation measurements. In making these measurements, a surprising number of events with neutral pions and little else visible in the detector were found. These were attributed to a larger than expected rate of coherent production of these neutral pions from hydrogen.

=== Data Preservation and Release ===
MINERvA is designing a general release of its data with a software package to allow anyone to analyze this preserved data.

== Neutrino communication ==
On March 14, 2012, MINERνA submitted a preprint demonstrating communication using neutrinos. Though not a part of the experiment's physics program, this is the first reported instance of a message being transmitted by neutrinos. Scientists used ASCII code to represent the word "neutrino" as a series of 1s and 0s. Over a period of 6 minutes, this sequence was delivered by either the presence (1) or absence (0) of a neutrino pulse, over a distance of about a kilometer. The data communication speed was 0.1 bit per second, with an error rate of 1%.
