= ENUBET =

The Enhanced NeUtrino BEams from kaon Tagging or ENUBET was an ERC funded project and became a CERN Neutrino Platform Project in 2019 (NP06/ENUBET) . Its goal is to design an artificial neutrino beam in which the flavor, flux and energy of the produced neutrinos are known with unprecedented precision.

Interest in these types of high precision neutrino beams has grown significantly in the last ten years, especially after the start of the construction of the DUNE and Hyper-Kamiokande detectors. DUNE and Hyper-Kamiokande are aimed at discovering CP violation in neutrinos observing a small difference between the probability of a muon-neutrino to oscillate into an electron-neutrino and the probability of a muon-antineutrino to oscillate into an electron-antineutrino. This effect points toward a difference in the behavior of matter and antimatter. In quantum field theory, this effect is described by a violation of the CP symmetry in particle physics.

The experiments that will measure CP violation need a very precise knowledge of the neutrino cross-sections, i.e. the probability for a neutrino to interact in the detector. This probability is measured counting the number of interacting neutrinos divided by the flux of incoming neutrinos. Current neutrino cross-section experiments are limited by large uncertainties in the neutrino flux. A new generation of cross-section experiment is therefore needed to overcome these limitations with new techniques or high precision beams, as ENUBET.

In ENUBET, neutrinos are produced by focusing mesons in a narrow band beam towards an instrumented decay tunnel, where charged leptons produced in association with neutrinos by mesons' decay can be monitored at the single particle level. Beams like ENUBET are called monitored neutrino beams.

Mesons (essentially pions and kaons) are produced in the interactions of accelerated protons with a Beryllium or Graphite target. The proposed facility is being studied taking into account the energies of currently available proton drivers: 400 GeV (CERN SPS), 120 GeV (FNAL Main Injector), 30 GeV (J-PARC Main Ring).

Kaons and pions are momentum and charge selected in a short transfer line by means of dipole and quadrupole magnets and are focused in a collimated beam into an instrumented decay tube. Large angle muons and positrons from kaon decays ($K^{+} \rightarrow \mu^+ \nu_{\mu}$, $K^{+} \rightarrow \mu^+ \pi^0 \nu_{\mu}$, $K^{+} \rightarrow e^+ \pi^0 \nu_{e}$) are measured by detectors on the tunnel walls, while muons from pion decays ($\pi^+ \rightarrow \mu^+ \nu_{\mu}$) are monitored after the hadron dump at the end of the tunnel. The decay region is kept short (40 m) in order to reduce the neutrino contamination from muon decays ($\mu^+ \rightarrow e^+ \nu_{e} \bar{\nu}_{\mu}$).

In this way, the neutrino flux is assessed in a direct way with a precision of 1%, without relying on complex simulations of the transfer line and on hadro-production data extrapolation that currently limits the knowledge of the flux to 5-10%. The ENUBET facility can be used to perform precision studies of the neutrino cross section and of sterile neutrinos or Non-Standard Interaction models. This method can also be extended to detect other leptons in order to have a complete monitored neutrino beam.

As of 2024, NP06/ENUBET involves 17 European institutions in 5 European countries and brings together about 80 scientists. ENUBET studies all technical and physics challenges to demonstrate the feasibility of a monitored neutrino beam: it has built a full-scale demonstrator of the instrumented decay tunnel (3 m length and partial azimuthal coverage) and assesses costs and physics reach of the proposed facility. The first end-to-end simulation of the ENUBET monitored neutrino beam was published in 2023 and the final performance of the demonstrator was published in 2026.

The NP06/ENUBET R&D programme was successfully completed in 2026, and the collaboration is finalizing its legacy publications. Building on the successful outcome of ENUBET, a new experimental proposal named nuSCOPE is being developed for submission to CERN.
