= Accelerator neutrino =

An accelerator neutrino is a human-generated neutrino or antineutrino obtained using particle accelerators, in which a beam of protons is accelerated and collided with a fixed target, producing mesons (mainly pions) which then decay into neutrinos. Depending on the energy of the accelerated protons and whether mesons decay in flight or at rest it is possible to generate neutrinos of a different flavour, energy and angular distribution. Accelerator neutrinos are used to study neutrino interactions and neutrino oscillations taking advantage of high intensity of neutrino beams, as well as a possibility to control and understand their type and kinematic properties to a much greater extent than for neutrinos from other neutrino sources.

== Muon neutrino beam production ==
Muon neutrino beam production scheme

Muon antineutrino beam production scheme

The process of the muon neutrino or muon antineutrino beam production consists of the following steps:

- Acceleration of a primary proton beam in a particle accelerator.
- Proton beam collision with a fixed target. In such a collision secondary particles, mainly pions and kaons, are produced.
- Focusing, by a set of magnetic horns, the secondary particles with a selected charge: positive to produce the muon neutrino beam, negative to produce the muon anti-neutrino beam.
- Decay of the secondary particles in flight in a long (of the order of hundreds meters) decay tunnel. Charged pions decay in more than 99.98% into a muon and the corresponding neutrino according to the principle of preserving electric charge and lepton number:

π^{+} → μ^{+} + ν_{μ} , π^{−} → μ^{−} + ν̅_{μ}

It is usually intended to have a pure beam, containing only one type of neutrino: either ν_{μ} or ν̅_{μ}. Thus, the length of the decay tunnel is optimised to maximise the number of pion decays and simultaneously minimise the number of muon decays, in which undesirable types of neutrinos are produced:

μ^{+} → e^{+} + ν̅_{μ} + ν_{e} , μ^{−} → e^{−} + ν_{μ} + ν̅_{e}

In most of kaon decays the appropriate type of neutrinos (muon neutrinos for positive kaons and muon antineutrinos for negative kaons) are produced:

K^{+} → μ^{+} + ν_{μ} , K^{−} → μ^{−} + ν̅_{μ} , (63.56% of decays),
K^{+} → μ^{+} + ν_{μ} + π^{0} , K^{−} → μ^{−} + ν̅_{μ} + π^{0} , (3.35% of decays),

however, decays into electron (anti)neutrinos, is also a significant fraction:

K^{+} → e^{+} + ν_{e} + π^{0} , K^{−} → e^{−} + ν̅_{e} + π^{0} , (5.07% of decays).

- Absorption of the remaining hadrons and charged leptons in a beam dump (usually a block of graphite) and in the ground. At the same time neutrinos unimpeded travel farther, close the direction of their parent particles.

== Neutrino beam kinematic properties ==
Neutrinos do not have an electric charge, so they cannot be focused or accelerated using electric and magnetic fields, and thus it is not possible to create a parallel, mono-energetic beam of neutrinos, as is done for charged particles beams in accelerators. To some extent, it is possible to control the direction and energy of neutrinos by properly selecting energy of the primary proton beam and focusing secondary pions and kaons, because the neutrinos take over part of their kinetic energy and move in a direction close to the parent particles.

=== Off-axis beam ===
A method that allows to further narrow the energy distribution of the produced neutrinos is the usage of the so-called off-axis beam. The accelerator neutrino beam is a wide beam that has no clear boundaries, because the neutrinos in it do not move in parallel, but have a certain angular distribution. However, the farther from the axis (centre) of the beam, the smaller is the number of neutrinos, but also the distribution of energy changes. The energy spectrum becomes narrower and its maximum shifts towards lower energies. The off-axis angle, and thus the neutrino energy spectrum, can be optimised to maximize neutrino oscillation probability or to select the energy range in which the desired type of neutrino interaction is dominant.

The first experiment in which the off-axis neutrino beam was used was the T2K experiment

=== Monitored and tagged neutrino beams ===
A high level of control of neutrinos at the source can be achieved by monitoring the production of charged leptons (positrons, muons) in the decay tunnel of the neutrino beam. Facilities that employ this method are called monitored neutrino beams. If the lepton rate is sufficiently small, modern particle detectors can time-tag the charged lepton produced in the decay tunnel and associate this lepton to the neutrino observed in the neutrino detector. This idea, which dates back to the 1960s, has been developed in the framework of the tagged neutrino beam concept but it has not been demonstrated, yet. Monitored neutrino beams produce neutrinos in a narrow energy range and, therefore, can employ the off-axis technique to predict the neutrino energy by measuring the interaction vertex, that is the distance of the neutrino interaction from the nominal beam axis. An energy resolution in the 10-20% range has been demonstrated in 2021 by the ENUBET Collaboration.

== Neutrino beams in physics experiments ==
Below is the list of muon (anti)neutrino beams used in past or current physics experiments:

- CERN Neutrinos to Gran Sasso (CNGS) beam produced by Super Proton Synchrotron at CERN used in OPERA and ICARUS experiments.
- Booster Neutrino Beam (BNB) produced by the Booster synchrotron at Fermilab used in SciBooNE, MiniBooNE and MicroBooNE experiments.
- Neutrinos at the Main Injector (NuMI) beam produced by the Main Injector synchrotron at Fermilab used in MINOS, MINERνA and NOνA experiments.
- K2K neutrino beam produced by a 12 GeV proton synchrotron at KEK in Tsukuba used in K2K experiment.
- T2K neutrino beam produced by the Main Ring synchrotron at J-PARC in Tokai used in T2K experiment.
