= NuMI =

Neutrinos at the Main Injector, or NuMI, is a project at Fermilab which creates an intense beam of neutrinos aimed towards the Far Detector facility near Ash River, Minnesota for use by several particle detectors. As of June 2010, the MINOS, MINERνA and NOνA experiments use the NuMI beam.

== Neutrino production ==
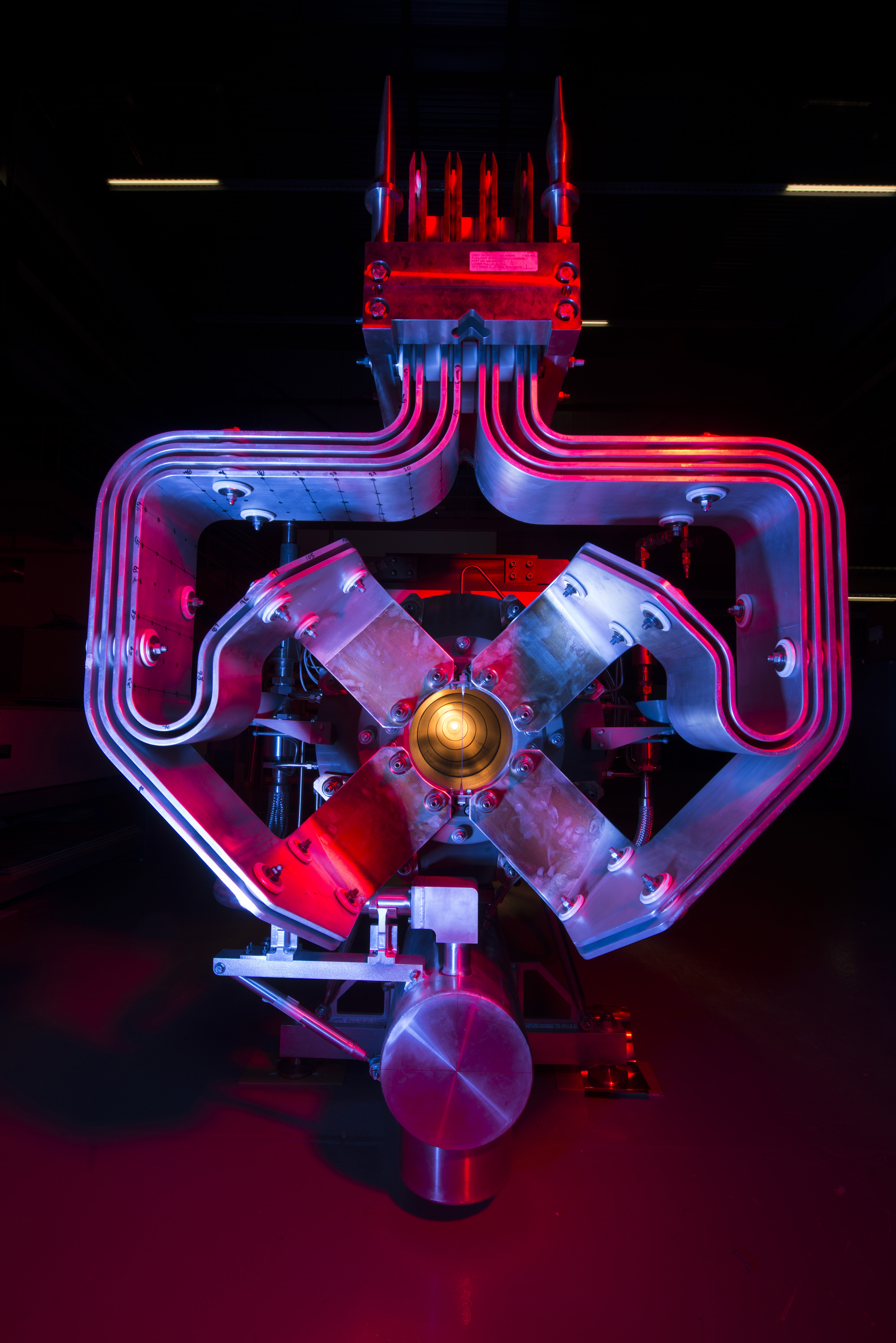
Focusing horn of the NuMI beam

The first step in the production of the NuMI beam is to direct a beam of protons from Fermilab's Main Injector onto a carbon target. Interactions of the proton beam in the target produce mesons, primarily pions and kaons, which are focused toward the beam axis by two magnetic horns. The mesons then decay into muons and neutrinos during their flight through a long decay tunnel. A hadron absorber downstream of the decay tunnel removes the remaining protons and mesons from the beam. The muons are absorbed by the subsequent earth shield, while the neutrinos continue through it to the MINERνA, MINOS, and NOvA near detectors on-site at Fermilab. The neutrinos then travel through the Earth to the MINOS far detector cavern in the Soudan Mine 735 km away and the NOvA far detector 810 km away at Ash River, MN, then onwards into space.

== Naming ==
Because of the close relationship between NuMI and the MINOS experiment, MINOS is sometimes conflated with NuMI. For instance, the MINOS webpage was at www-numi.fnal.gov instead of www-minos.fnal.gov.
