= MINOS =

Particle physics experiment

Coordinates: 47°49′12″N 92°14′30″W

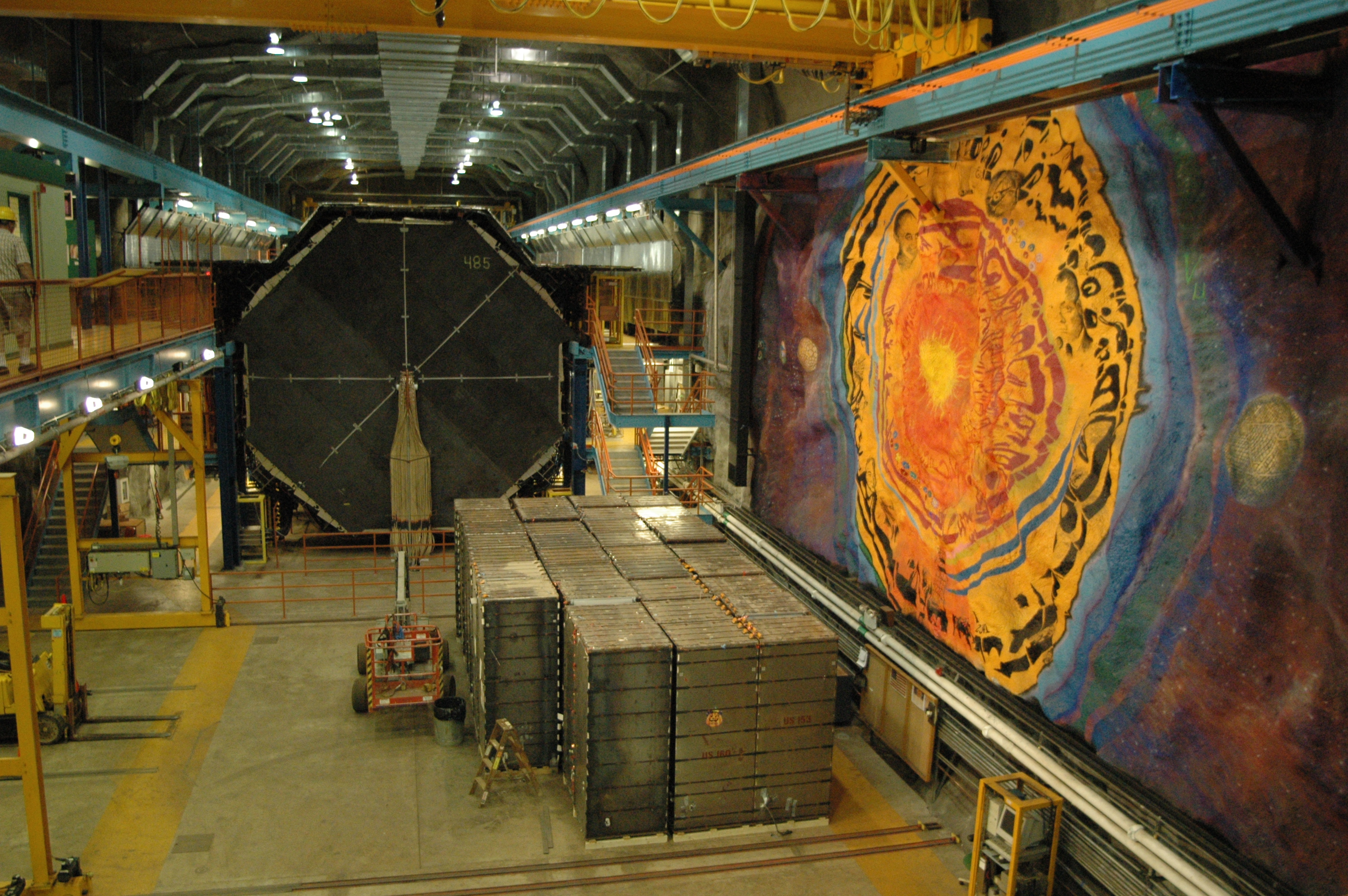
Front face of the MINOS far detector. On the left is the control room and on the right is a mural by Joseph Giannetti.

Main injector neutrino oscillation search (MINOS) was a particle physics experiment designed to study the phenomena of neutrino oscillations, first discovered by a Super-Kamiokande (Super-K) experiment in 1998. Neutrinos produced by the NuMI ("Neutrinos at Main Injector") beamline at Fermilab near Chicago are observed at two detectors, one very close to where the beam is produced (the near detector), and another much larger detector 735 km away in northern Minnesota (the far detector).

The MINOS experiment started detecting neutrinos from the NuMI beam in February 2005. On 30 March 2006, the MINOS collaboration announced that the analysis of the initial data, collected in 2005, is consistent with neutrino oscillations, with the oscillation parameters which are consistent with Super-K measurements. MINOS received the last neutrinos from the NUMI beam line at midnight on 30 April 2012. It was upgraded to MINOS+ which started taking data in 2013. The experiment was shut down on June 29, 2016, and the far detector has been dismantled and removed.

== Detectors ==
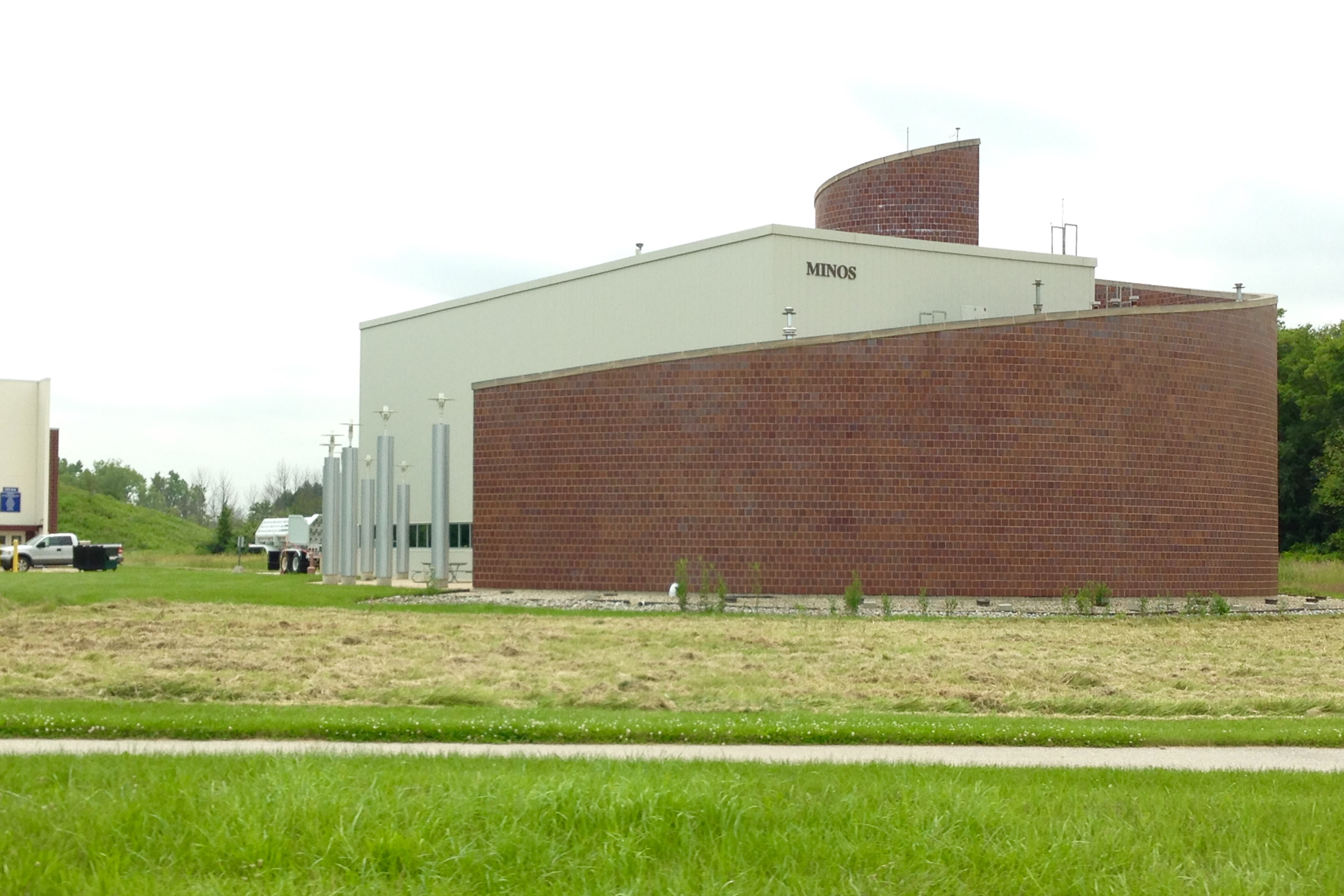
MINOS service building at Fermilab, the entrance to the underground MINOS hall that hosts the near detector.

There are two detectors in the experiment.

- The near detector is similar to the far detector in design, but smaller in size with a mass of 980 tons (t). It is located at Fermilab, a few hundred meters away from the graphite target which the protons interact with, and approximately 100 meters underground. The commissioning of the near detector was completed in December 2004, and it is now fully operational.
- The far detector has a mass of 5.4 kt. It is located in the Soudan mine in Northern Minnesota at a depth of 716 meters. The far detector has been fully operational since summer 2003, and has been taking cosmic ray and atmospheric neutrino data since early in its construction.

Both MINOS detectors are steel-scintillator sampling calorimeters made out of alternating planes of magnetized steel and plastic scintillators. The magnetic field causes the path of a muon produced in a muon neutrino interaction to bend, making it possible to distinguish interactions with neutrinos from those with antineutrinos. This feature of the MINOS detectors allows MINOS to search for CPT-violation with atmospheric neutrinos and anti-neutrinos.

== Neutrino beam ==
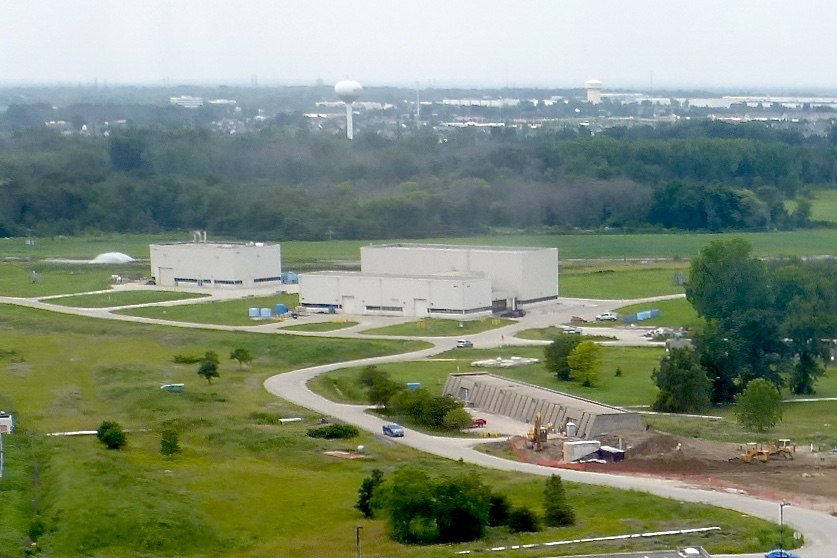
NuMI Target Hall (left), the starting point of the NuMI tunnel with the Main Injector in the background.

To produce the NuMI beamline, 120 GeV Main Injector proton pulses hit a water-cooled graphite target. The resulting interactions of protons with the target material produce pions and kaons, which are focused by a system of magnetic horns. The neutrinos from subsequent decays of pions and kaons form the neutrino beam. Most of these are muon neutrinos, with a small electron neutrino contamination. Neutrino interactions in the near detector are used to measure the initial neutrino flux and energy spectrum. Because they are weakly interacting and therefore usually pass through matter, the vast majority of the neutrinos travel through the near detector and the 734 km of rock, then through the far detector and off into space. On the way toward Soudan, about 20% of the muon neutrinos oscillate into other flavors.

== Physics goals and results ==
MINOS measures the difference in neutrino beam composition and energy distribution in the near and far detectors with the aim of producing precision measurements of the neutrino squared mass difference and mixing angle. In addition, MINOS looks for the appearance of electron neutrinos in the far detector, and will either measure or set a limit on the oscillation probability of muon neutrinos into electron neutrinos.

On 29 July 2006, the MINOS collaboration published a paper giving their initial measurements of oscillation parameters as judged from muon neutrino disappearance. These are: Δm^{2}_{23} = 2.74+0.44
−0.26 × 10^{−3} eV^{2}/c^{4} and sin^{2}(2θ_{23}) > 0.87 (68% confidence limit).

In 2008, MINOS released a further result using over twice the previous data (3.36×10^{20} protons-on-target; this includes the first data set). This is the most precise measurement of Δm^{2}. The results are: Δm^{2}_{23} = 2.43+0.13
−0.13 × 10^{−3} eV^{2}/c^{4} and sin^{2}(2θ_{23}) > 0.90 (90% confidence limit).

In 2011, the above results were updated again, using a more than double data sample (exposure of 7.25×10^{20} protons on target) and improved analysis methodology. The results are: Δm^{2}_{23} = 2.32+0.12
−0.08 × 10^{−3} eV^{2}/c^{4} and sin^{2}(2θ_{23}) > 0.90 (90% confidence limit).

In 2010 and 2011, MINOS reported results according to which there is a difference in the disappearance and consequently the masses between antineutrinos and neutrinos, which would violate CPT symmetry. However, after additional data were evaluated in 2012, MINOS reported that this gap has closed and no excess is there any more.

Cosmic ray results from the MINOS far detector have shown that there is a strong correlation between high energy cosmic rays measured and the temperature of the stratosphere. This is the first time, daily variations in secondary cosmic rays from an underground muon detector are shown to be associated with planetary–scale meteorological phenomena in the stratosphere such as the sudden stratospheric warming as well as the change in seasons. The MINOS far detector is also able to observe a reduction in cosmic rays caused by the Sun and the Moon.

=== Time of flight of neutrinos ===
In 2007, an experiment with the MINOS detectors found the speed of 3 GeV neutrinos to be 1.000051(29) c at 68% confidence level, and at 99% confidence level a range between 0.999976 c to 1.000126 c. The central value was higher than the speed of light; however, the uncertainty was great enough that the result also did not rule out speeds less than or equal to light at this high confidence level.

After the detectors for the project were upgraded in 2012, MINOS corrected their initial result and found agreement with the speed of light, with the difference in the arrival times of −0.0006% (±0.0012%) between neutrinos and light. Further measurements are going to be conducted.
