= Hyper-Kamiokande =

Neutrino observatory in Japan

Coordinates: 36°21′20.105″N 137°18′49.137″E

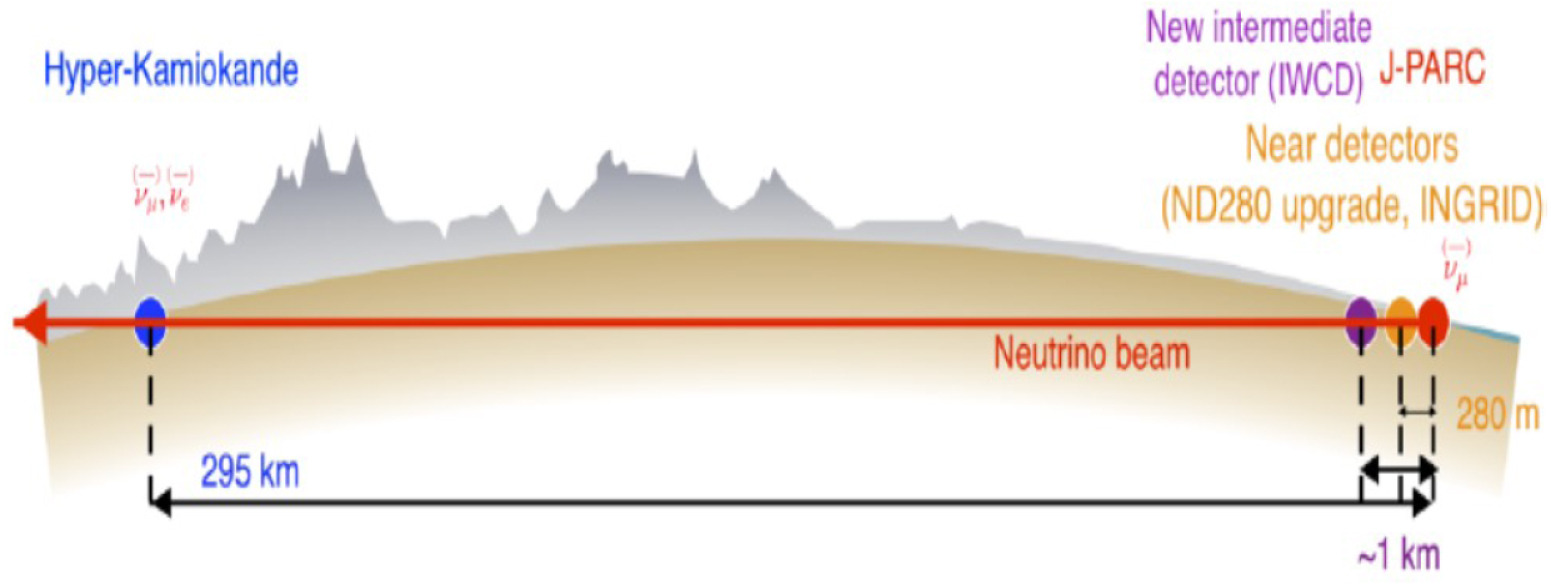
Overview of the Hyper-Kamiokande experiment

Hyper-Kamiokande (Japanese: ハイパーカミオカンデ, Hepburn: Haipā Kamiokande; also called Hyper-K or HK) is a neutrino observatory and experiment under construction in Hida, Gifu Prefecture and in Tokai, Ibaraki Prefecture in Japan. It is conducted by the University of Tokyo and the High Energy Accelerator Research Organization (KEK), in collaboration with institutes from over 20 countries across six continents. As a successor of the Super-Kamiokande (also Super-K or SK) and T2K experiments, it is designed to search for proton decay and detect neutrinos from natural sources such as the Earth, the atmosphere, the Sun and the cosmos, as well as to study neutrino oscillations of the man-made accelerator neutrino beam. The beginning of data-taking is planned for 2028.

The Hyper-Kamiokande experiment facility will be located in two places:

- The neutrino beam will be produced in the accelerator complex J-PARC and studied by the set of near and intermediate detectors located in Tokai village, Ibaraki prefecture, on the east coast of Japan.
- The main detector, also called Hyper-Kamiokande (HK), is being constructed under the peak of Nijuugo Mountain in Hida city, Gifu Prefecture, in the Japanese Alps. The HK detector will be used for proton decay searches, studies of neutrinos from natural sources and will serve as a far detector for the measurement of the oscillations of an accelerator neutrino beam at the distance corresponding to the first oscillation maximum.

== Physics program ==
=== Accelerator and atmospheric neutrino oscillations ===
Neutrino oscillations are a quantum mechanical phenomenon in which neutrinos change their flavour (neutrino flavours states: ν_{e}, ν_{μ}, ν_{τ}) while moving, caused by the fact that the neutrino flavour states are a mixture of the neutrino mass states (ν_{1}, ν_{2}, ν_{3} mass states with masses m_{1}, m_{2}, m_{3}, respectively). The oscillation probabilities depend on the six theoretical parameters:

- three mixing angles (θ_{12}, θ_{23} and θ_{13}) governing the mixing between mass and flavour states,
- two mass squared differences (∆m^{2}_{21} and ∆m^{2}_{32}, where ∆m^{2}_{ij} = m^{2}_{i} – m^{2}_{j})
- one phase (δ_{CP}) responsible for the matter-antimatter asymmetry (CP symmetry violation) in neutrino oscillations,

and two parameters which are chosen for a particular experiment:

- neutrino energy
- baseline – the distance travelled by neutrinos at which oscillations are measured.

Continuing studies done by the T2K experiment, the HK far detector will measure the energy spectra of electron and muon neutrinos in the beam (produced at J-PARC as an almost pure muon neutrino beam) and compare it with the expectation in case of no oscillations, which is initially calculated based on neutrino flux and interaction models and improved by measurements performed by the near and intermediate detectors. For the HK/T2K neutrino beam peak energy (600 MeV) and the J-PARC – HK/SK detector distance (295 km), this corresponds to the first oscillation maximum, for oscillations driven by ∆m^{2}_{32}. The J-PARC neutrino beam will run in both neutrino- and antineutrino-enhanced modes separately, meaning that neutrino measurements in each beam mode will provide information about muon (anti)neutrino survival probability P_{ν_{μ} → ν_{μ}}, P_{ν̅_{μ} → ν̅_{μ}}, and electron (anti)neutrino appearance probability P_{ν_{μ} → ν_{e}}, P_{ν̅_{μ} → ν̅_{e}} , where P_{ν_{α}} → P_{ν_{β}} is the probability that a neutrino originally of flavour α will be observed later as having flavour β.

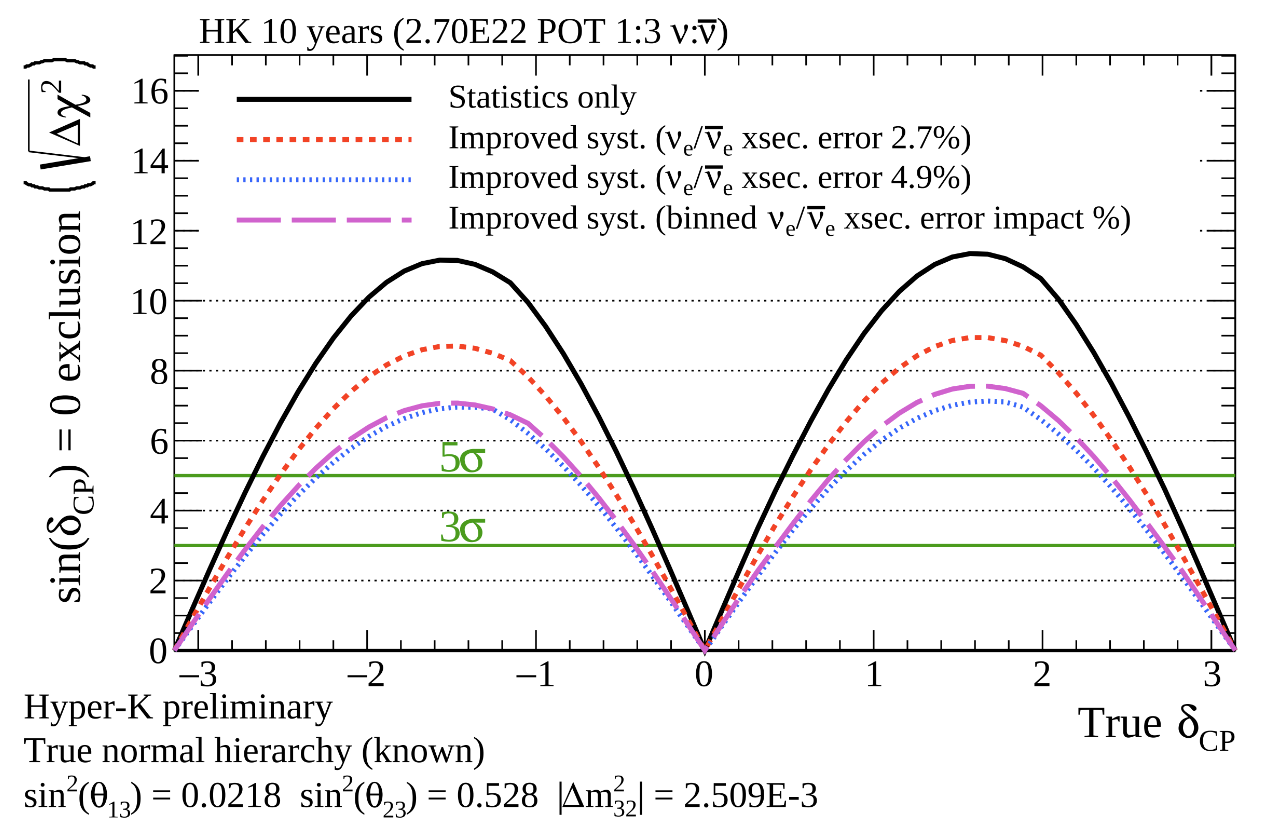
The ability of Hyper-K to exclude CP conservation as a function of the true value of δ_{CP}

Comparison of the appearance probabilities for neutrinos and antineutrinos (P_{ν_{μ} → ν_{e}} versus P_{ν̅_{μ} → ν̅_{e}}) allows measurement of the δ_{CP} phase. δ_{CP} ranges from −π to +π (from −180° to +180°), and 0 and ±π correspond to CP symmetry conservation. After 10 years of data taking, HK is expected to confirm at the 5σ confidence level or better if CP symmetry is violated in the neutrino oscillations for 57% of possible δ_{CP} values. CP violation is one of the conditions necessary to produce the excess of matter over antimatter at the early universe, which forms now our matter-built universe. Accelerator neutrinos will be used also to enhance the precision of the other oscillation parameters, |∆m^{2}_{32}|, θ_{23} and θ_{13}, as well as for neutrino interaction studies.

In order to determine the neutrino mass ordering (whether the ν_{3} mass eigenstate is lighter or heavier than both ν_{1} and ν_{2}), or equivalently the unknown sign of the ∆m^{2}_{32} parameter, neutrino oscillations must be observed in matter. With HK beam neutrinos (295 km, 600 MeV), the matter effect is small. In addition to beam neutrinos, the HK experiment studies atmospheric neutrinos, created by cosmic rays colliding with the Earth's atmosphere, producing neutrinos and other byproducts. These neutrinos are produced at all points on the globe, meaning that HK has access to neutrinos that have travelled through a wide range of distances through matter (from a few hundred metres to the Earth's diameter). These samples of neutrinos can be used to determine the neutrino mass ordering.

Ultimately, a combined beam neutrino and atmospheric neutrino analysis will provide the most sensitivity to the oscillation parameters δ_{CP}, |∆m^{2}_{32}|, sgn ∆m^{2}_{32}, θ_{23} and θ_{13}.

=== Neutrino astronomy and geoneutrinos ===
Core-collapse supernova explosions produce great quantities of neutrinos. For a supernova in the Andromeda Galaxy, 10 to 16 neutrino events are expected in the HK far detector. For a galactic supernova at a distance of 10 kpc about 50,000 to 94,000 neutrino interactions are expected during a few tens of seconds. For Betelgeuse at the distance 0.2 kpc, this rate could reach up to 10^{8} interactions per second and such a high event rate was taken into account in the detector electronics and data acquisition (DAQ) system design, meaning that no data would be lost. Time profiles of the number of events registered in HK and their mean energy would enable testing models of the explosion. Neutrino directional information in the HK far detector can provide an early warning for the electromagnetic supernova observation and can be used in other multi-messenger observations.

Neutrinos cumulatively produced by supernova explosions throughout the history of the universe are called supernova relic neutrinos (SRN) or diffuse supernova neutrino background (DSNB) and they carry information about star formation history. Because of a low flux (few tens/cm^{2}/sec.), they have not yet been discovered. With ten years of data taking, HK is expected to detect about 40 SRN events in the energy range 16–30 MeV.

For the solar ν_{e}'s, the HK experiment goals are:

- Search for a day-night asymmetry in the neutrino flux – resulting from different distances travelled in matter (during the night neutrinos additionally cross the Earth before entering the detector) and thus the different oscillation probabilities caused by the matter effect.
- Measurement of the ν_{e} survival probability for neutrino energies between 2 and 7 MeV – i.e. between regions dominated by oscillations in vacuum and oscillations in matter, respectively – which is sensitive to new physics models, like sterile neutrinos or non-standard interactions.
- The first observation of neutrinos from the hep channel: ${^3}\text{He} + \text{p} \to {^4}\text{He} + \text{e}^{+} + \operatorname{\nu}_\text{e}$ predicted by the standard solar model.
- Comparison of the neutrino flux with the solar activity (e.g. the 11-year solar cycle).

Geoneutrinos are produced in decays of radionuclides inside the Earth. Hyper-Kamiokande geoneutrino studies will help assess the Earth's core chemical composition, which is connected with the generation of the geomagnetic field.

=== Proton decay ===
The decay of a free proton into lighter subatomic particles has never been observed, but it is predicted by some grand unified theories (GUT) and results from baryon number (B) violation. B violation is one of the conditions needed to explain the predominance of matter over antimatter in the universe. The main channels studied by HK are p^{+} → e^{+} + π^{0} which is favoured by many GUT models and p^{+} → ν̅ + K^{+} predicted by theories including supersymmetry.

After ten years of data taking, (in case no decay will be observed) HK is expected to increase the lower limit of the proton mean lifetime from 1.6 · 10^{34} to 6.3 · 10^{34} years for its most sensitive decay channel (p^{+} → e^{+} + π^{0}) and from 0.7 · 10^{34} to 2.0 · 10^{34} years for the p^{+} → ν̅ + K^{+} channel.

=== Dark matter ===
Dark matter is a hypothetical, non-luminous form of matter proposed to explain numerous astronomical observations suggesting the existence of additional invisible mass in galaxies. If the dark matter particles interact weakly, they may produce neutrinos through annihilation or decay. Those neutrinos could be visible in the HK detector as an excess of neutrinos from the direction of large gravitational potentials such as the Galactic Center, the Sun or the Earth, over an isotropic atmospheric neutrino background.

== Experiment description ==
The Hyper-Kamiokande experiment consists of an accelerator neutrino beamline, a set of near detectors, the intermediate detector and the far detector (also called Hyper-Kamiokande). The far detector by itself will be used for proton decay searches and studies of neutrinos from natural sources. All the above elements will serve for the accelerator neutrino oscillation studies. Before launching the HK experiment, the T2K experiment will finish data taking and HK will take over its neutrino beamline and set of near detectors, while the intermediate and the far detectors have to be constructed anew.

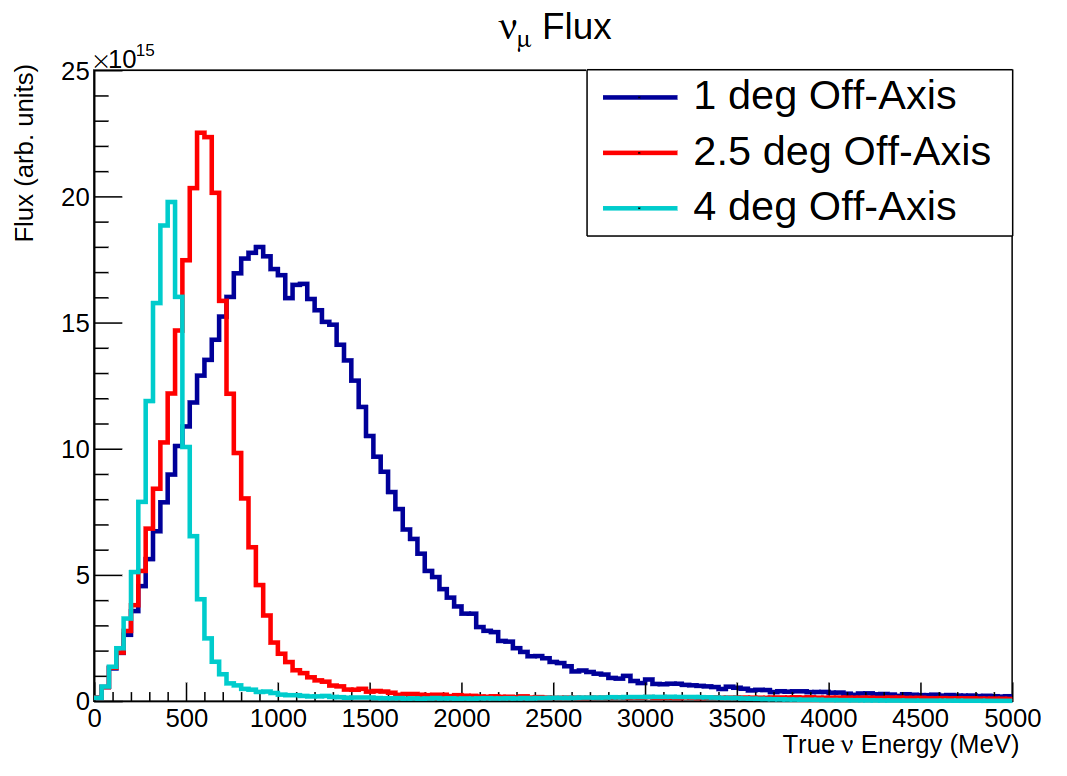
The muon neutrino flux at the IWCD detector for different off-axis angles

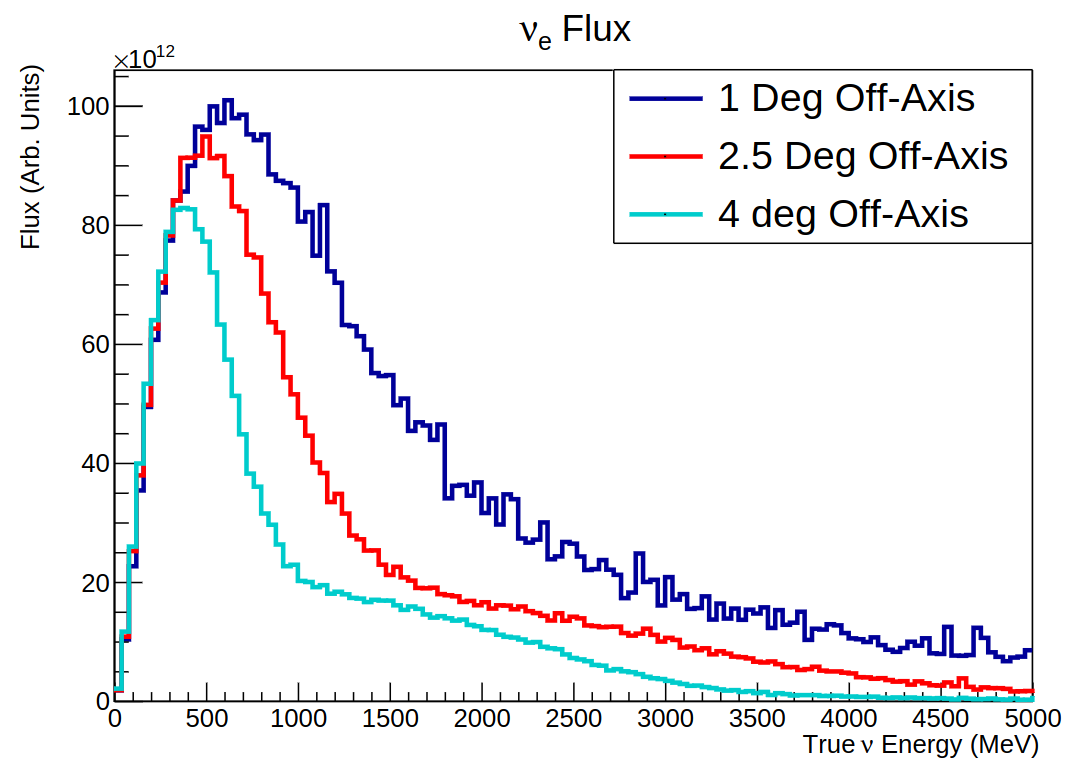
The electron neutrino flux at the IWCD detector for different off-axis angles

=== Intermediate Water Cherenkov Detector ===
The Intermediate Water Cherenkov Detector (IWCD) will be located at a distance of around 750 metres (2,460 ft) from the neutrino production place. It will be a cylinder filled with water with a diameter of 10 metres (33 ft) and height of 50 metres (160 ft) with a 10 metres (33 ft) tall structure instrumented with around 400 multi-PMT modules (mPMTs), each consisting of nineteen 8 centimetres (3.1 in) diameter PhotoMultiplier Tubes (PMTs) encapsulated in a water-proof vessel. The structure will be moved in a vertical direction by a crane system, providing measurements of neutrino interactions at different off-axis angles (angles to the neutrino beam centre), spanning from 1° at the bottom to 4° at the top, and thus for different neutrino energy spectra. (Note: The average energy of neutrinos decreases with the deviation from the beam axis.)

Combining the results from different off-axis angles, it is possible to extract the results for nearly monoenergetic neutrino spectrum without relying on theoretical models of neutrino interactions to reconstruct neutrino energy. Usage of the same type of detector as the far detector with almost the same angular and momentum acceptance allows comparison of results from these two detectors without relying on detector response simulations. These two facts, independence from the neutrino interaction and detector response models, will enable HK to minimise systematic error in the oscillation analysis. Additional advantages of such a design of the detector is the possibility to search for sterile oscillation patterns for different off-axis angles and to obtain a cleaner sample of electron neutrino interactions, whose fraction is larger for larger off-axis angles.

=== Hyper-Kamiokande far detector ===
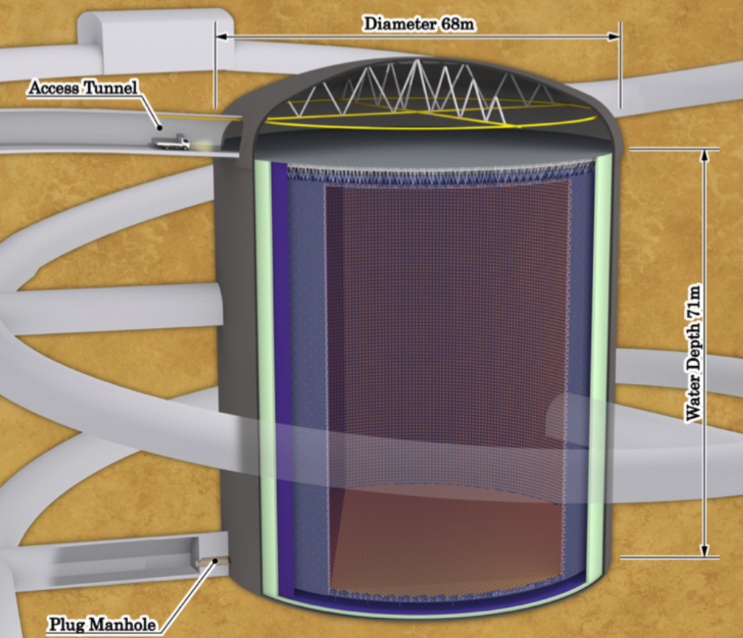
A schematic of the Hyper-Kamiokande Far Detector, a water Cherenkov detector

The Hyper-Kamiokande detector will be built 650 metres (2,130 ft) under the peak of Nijuugo Mountain in the Tochibora mine, 8 kilometres (5.0 mi) south from the Super-Kamiokande (SK) detector. Both detectors will be at the same off-axis angle (2.5°) to the neutrino beam centre and at the same distance (295 kilometres (183 mi)) from the beam production place in J-PARC. (Note: The Super-Kamiokande detector serves as a far detector for the neutrino oscillation analysis by the T2K experiment. However, Super-Kamiokande is also a separate experiment in the matter of proton decay searches and studies of neutrinos from natural sources.)

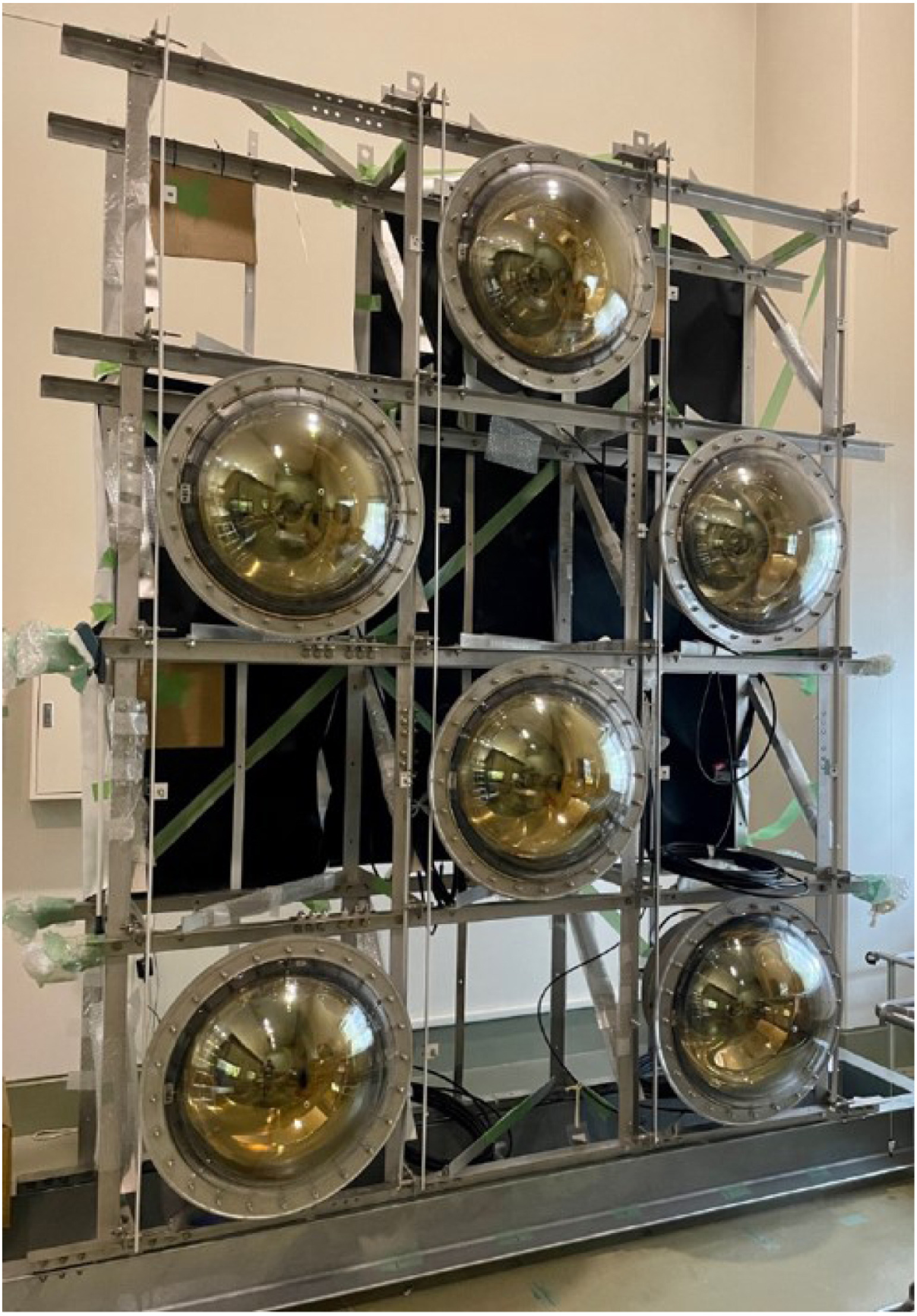
A mockup of 50 cm R12860 PMTs for the Hyper-Kamiokande Far Detector Inner Detector

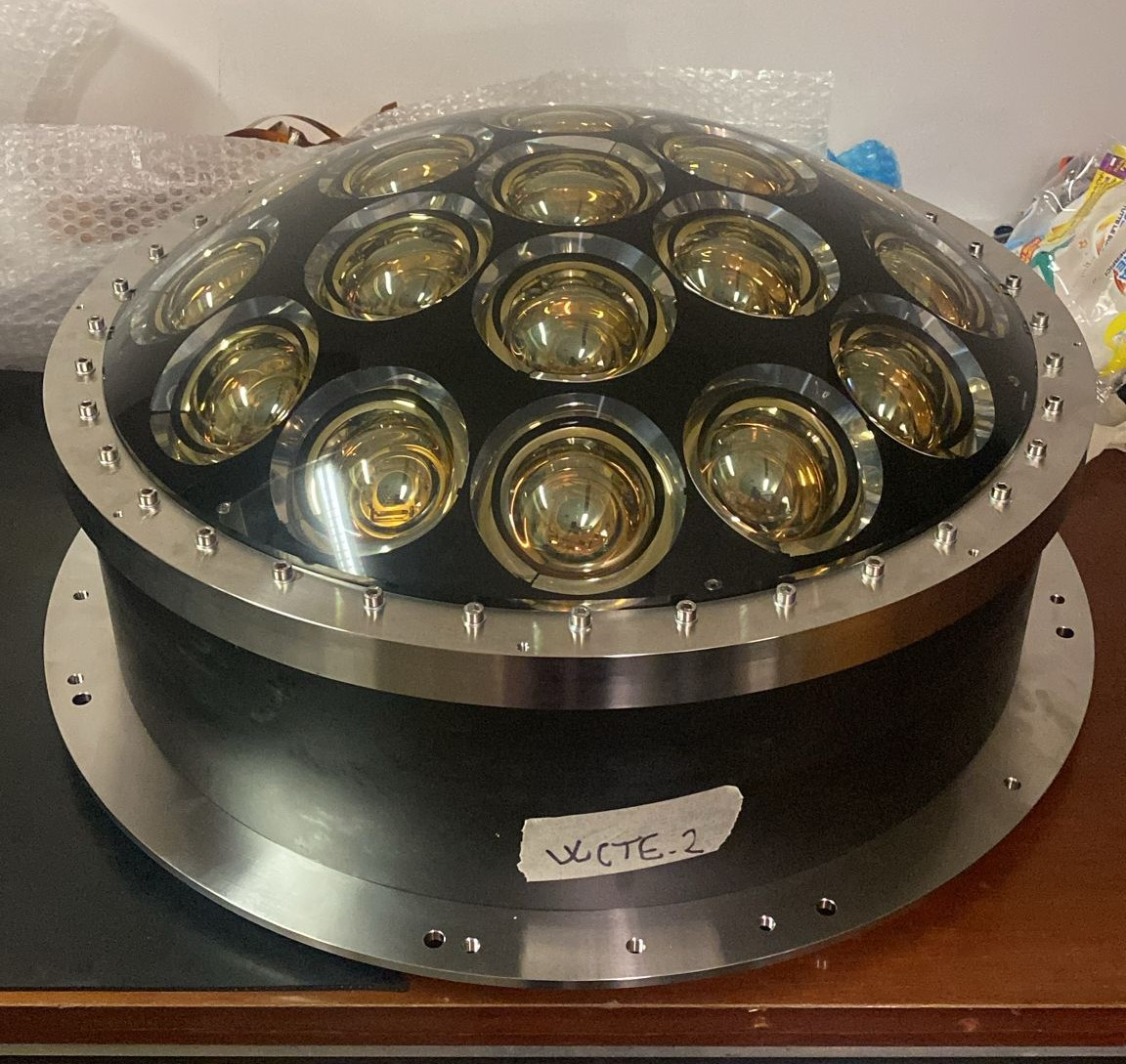
A prototype of a mPMT for the Hyper-Kamiokande Far Detector Inner Detector

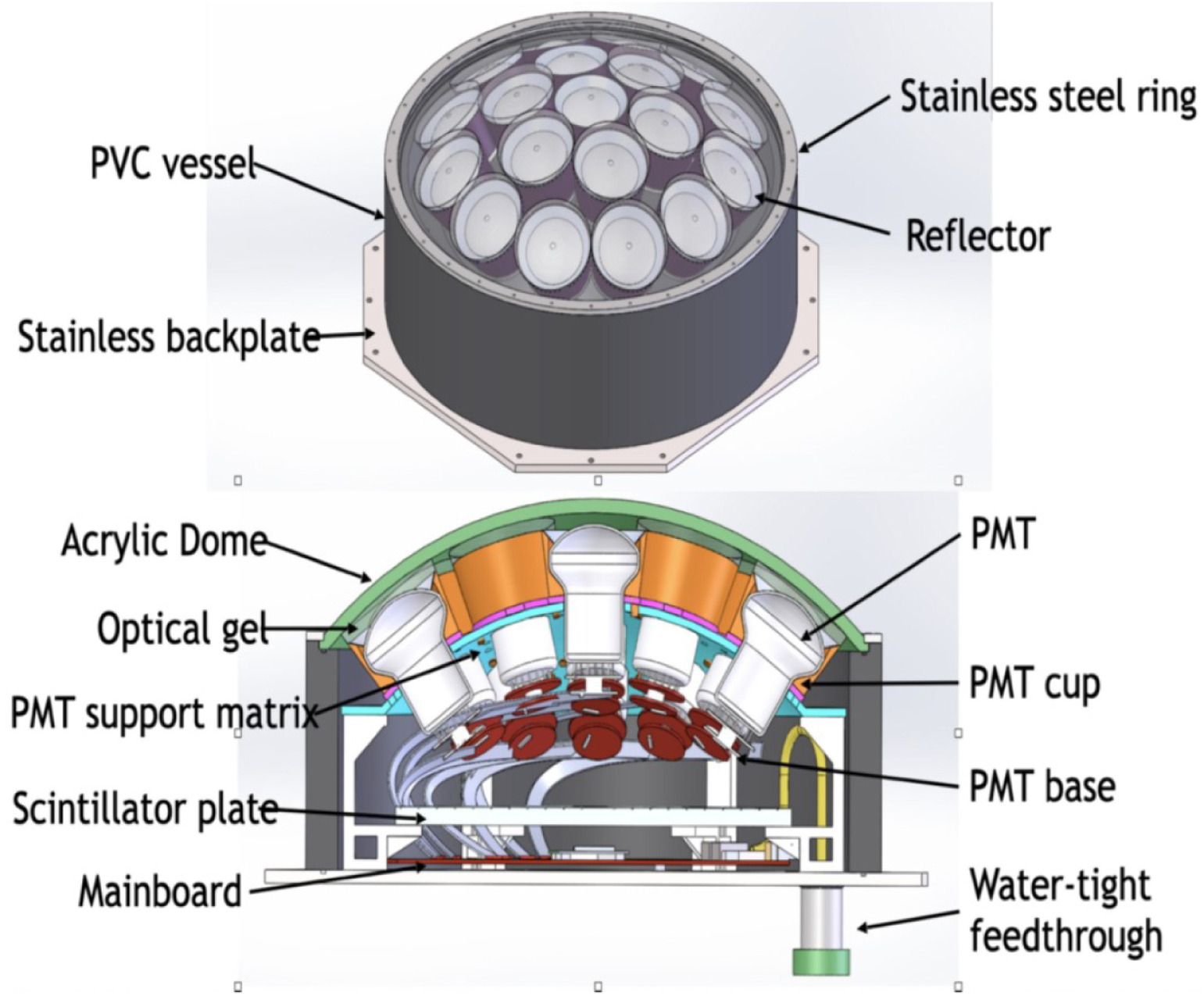
A schematic of a mPMT for the Hyper-Kamiokande Far Detector Inner Detector

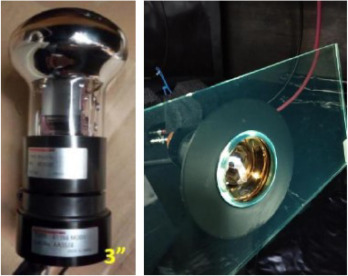
3-inch PMT (Photomultiplier) and WLS (Wavelength-Shifting Fiber) plate for Hyper-Kamiokande Far Detector Outer Detector

HK will be a water Cherenkov detector, 5 times larger (258 kton of water) than the SK detector. It will be a cylindrical tank of 68 metres (223 ft) diameter and 71 metres (233 ft) height. The tank volume will be divided into the Inner Detector (ID) and the Outer Detector (OD) by a 60 cm-wide inactive cylindrical structure, with its outer edge positioned 1 meter away from vertical and 2 meters away from horizontal tank walls. The structure will optically separate ID from OD and will hold PhotoMultiplier Tubes (PMTs) looking both inwards to the ID and outwards to the OD.

In the ID, there will be at least 20,000 50 centimetres (20 in) diameter PhotoMultiplier Tubes (PMTs) of R12860 type by Hamamatsu Photonics and approximately 800 multi-PMT modules (mPMTs). Each mPMT module consists of nineteen 8 centimetres (3.1 in) diameter PMTs encapsulated in a water-proof vessel. The OD will be instrumented with at least 3,600 8 centimetres (3.1 in) diameter PMTs coupled with 0.6×30×30 cm^{3} wavelength shifting (WLS) plates to collect incident photons and transport them to their coupled PMTs. This allows it to serve as a veto (Note: Veto is part of a detector where no activity should be registered to accept an event. Such a requirement allows constraining the number of background events in a selected sample.) layer distinguishing interactions occurring inside from particles entering from the outside of the detector (mainly cosmic-ray muons).

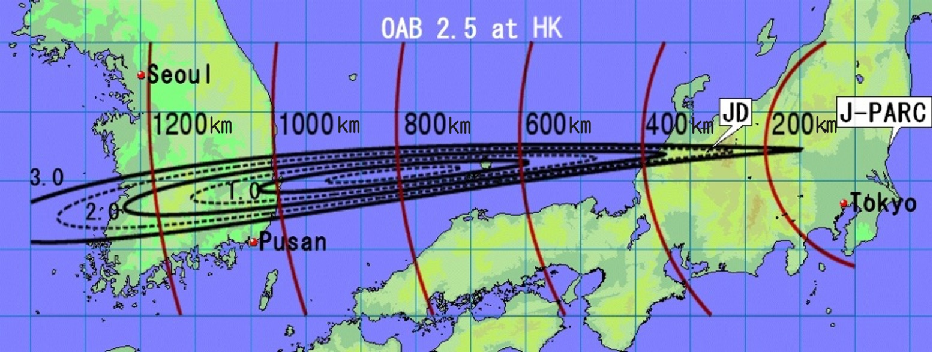
J-PARC neutrino beam Japan to Korea

HK detector construction began in 2020 and the start of data collection is expected in 2028; the excavation of the main cavern was completed on July 31, 2025. Studies have also been undertaken on the feasibility and physics benefits of building a second, identical water-Cherenkov tank in South Korea around 1100 km from J-PARC, which would be operational 6 years after the first tank.

== History and schedule ==
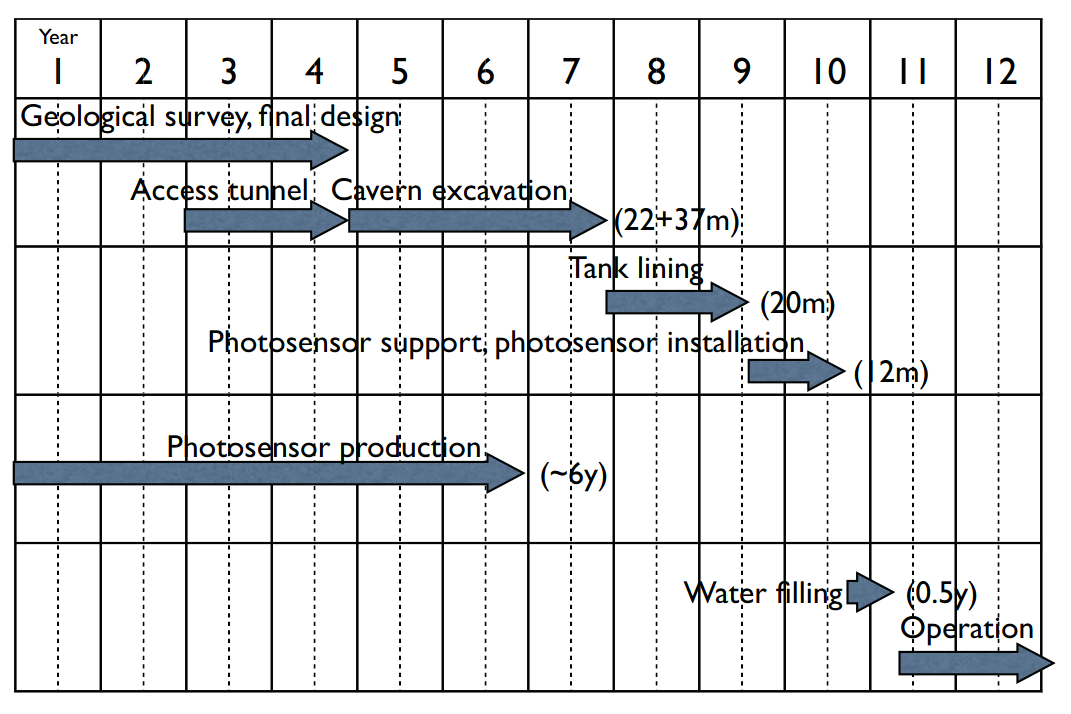
The Hyper-Kamiokande detector construction schedule

A history of large water Cherenkov detectors in Japan, and long-baseline neutrino oscillation experiments associated with them, excluding HK:

- 1983-1996: Kamiokande (Kamioka Nucleon Decay Experiment), which main goal was proton decay searches (the Nobel Prize in Physics 2002 for Masatoshi Koshiba) – the predecessor of Super-Kamiokande
- 1996–present: Super-Kamiokande experiment – the predecessor of the Hyper-Kamiokande experiment, studying neutrinos from natural sources and searching for proton decay (the Nobel Prize in Physics 2015 for Takaaki Kajita)
- 1999–2004: K2K experiment – the predecessor of the T2K experiment
- 2010–present: T2K experiment – the predecessor of the Hyper-Kamiokande experiment, studying accelerator neutrino oscillations

A history of the Hyper-Kamiokande experiment:

- September 1999: First ideas of the new experiment presented
- 2000: The name "Hyper-Kamiokande" used for the first time
- September 2011: Submitting LOI
- January 2015: MoU for cooperation in the Hyper-Kamiokande project signed by two host institutions: ICRR and KEK. Formation of the Hyper-Kamiokande proto-collaboration
- May 2018: Hyper-Kamiokande Design Report
- September 2018: Seed funding from MEXT allocated in 2019
- February 2020: The project officially approved by the Japanese Diet
- June 2020: Formation of the Hyper-Kamiokande collaboration
- May 2021: Start of the HK detector access tunnel excavation
- 2021: Beginning of the photomultiplier tubes mass production
- February 2022: Completion of the access tunnel construction
- October 2023: Completion of the HK detector main cavern dome section
- July 2025: Excavation of the main cavern is completed
- 2028: The expected beginning of data-taking

== See also ==
- Super-Kamiokande, predecessor
- T2K experiment, Japan
- Deep Underground Neutrino Experiment, South Dakota

== Bibliography ==
- Normile, D (2015). "Particle physics. Japanese neutrino physicists think really big". Science. 347 (6222): 598. doi:10.1126/science.347.6222.598. PMID 25657225.
