= Diffuse supernova neutrino background =

The diffuse supernova neutrino background (DSNB) is a theoretical population of neutrinos (and anti-neutrinos) cumulatively originating from all core-collapse supernovae events throughout the history of the universe. Though it has not yet been directly detected, the DSNB is theorized to be isotropic and consists of neutrinos with typical energies on the scale of 10^{7} eV. Current detection efforts are limited by the influence of background noise in the search for DSNB neutrinos and are therefore limited to placing limits on the parameters of the DSNB, namely the neutrino flux. Restrictions on these parameters have gotten more strict in recent years, but many researchers are looking to make direct observations in the near future with next generation detectors. The DSNB is not to be confused with the cosmic neutrino background (CNB), which is comprised by relic neutrinos that were produced during the Big Bang and have much lower energies (10^{−4} to 10^{−6} eV).

== Sources ==
In a core collapse supernova, all flavors of neutrinos are produced. First, electron neutrinos are produced early on in the collapse through electron capture on protons in the nuclei of the star's iron core:

Feynman diagram of $\nu_e$ production through electron capture

$$p + e^- \rightarrow \nu_e + n$$

Some of the neutrons produced in this reaction then undergo beta decay, producing electron anti-neutrinos:

$$n \rightarrow p + e^- + \bar{\nu_e}$$

After these processes, the collapse continues before rebounding due to pressure of the accumulated matter at the core. This rebound produces a shock wave, at which point many of the previously produced electron neutrinos are ejected in what is called a neutrino burst. The energy carried away from the supernova by the neutrino burst weakens the shock, and matter falls into the remnant of the progenitor star. At this point, many neutrinos are trapped by this infalling matter resulting in large density. When temperatures at the core are sufficient (> 10 MeV), all flavors of neutrinos and their respective antineutrinos are produced via weak interactions of electron-positron pairs:

$$e^- + e^+ \rightarrow \nu_{e/\tau/\mu} + \bar{\nu}_{e/\tau/\mu}$$

The neutrinos subsequently re-energize the shock through interactions with free protons and neutrons as well as other neutrinos, and are ejected once they can overcome the density of the matter within the shock by which they were previously trapped.

An individual supernova will release as many as $10^{57}$ neutrinos, which is detectable as a short burst of events on Earth provided that the supernova occurred close by enough, either within our own galaxy or one of its satellite galaxies; the only current example of which is SN1987A. In contrast, the DSNB is a continuous source of neutrinos accumulated from all of the individual core-collapse supernovae throughout the history of the universe. Due to uncertainties in the emitted neutrino spectrum and the lack of direct detection, only experimental upper limits currently exist for the DSNB flux.

== Predicted detections ==
Theoretical predictions for the flux of the DSNB on Earth are difficult as they depend on many different parameters and assumptions, mainly the rate of core-collapse supernovae events in the universe and the neutrino spectrum from each supernova. Initial predictions based on supernova rates and evolution of the cosmic gas have been revisited in more recent works. However, given the uncertainties the DSNB flux should not be more than an order of magnitude below the current experimental bound, and so should be detectable in the near future.

== Detection attempts ==
With current detectors, it is difficult to directly measure the DSNB on the order of 10^{6} eV due to high background signal from solar neutrinos, reactor antineutrinos, and radioactivity. As a result, multiple experiments have made attempts to probe the DSNB signal at a magnitude above (10^{7} eV) to place upper limits on the flux and detection spectrum at earth.

=== Super-Kamiokande ===
The Super-Kamiokande (SK) neutrino observatory in Japan is the largest water Cherenkov detector in the world. The detector contains 50 kilotons of water, which functions as a target for neutrino interactions. The neutrinos interact with the target water and emit Cherenkov radiation, measured by thousands of photomultiplier tubes (PMTs) surrounding the target volume. In 2003, the SK experiment yielded an upper limit on the flux of $1.2 \bar{\nu_e} \, \mathrm{cm}^{-2} \, \mathrm{s}^{-1}$ for neutrinos with energy greater than 19.3 MeV, which was already able to rule out some of the DSNB models at the time. These restrictions were later improved by the SK team after improvements to the detector and were then found to be $2.9 \bar{\nu_e} \, \mathrm{cm}^{-2} \, \mathrm{s}^{-1}$ for neutrinos at energies above 17.3 MeV. In 2021, based on SK-IV measurements up to 2018, the limit was strengthened to $2.7 \bar{\nu_e} \, \mathrm{cm}^{-2} \, \mathrm{s}^{-1}$ at a 90% confidence level.

In 2020, the Super-Kamiokande detector was improved with the introduction of gadolinium to allow better identify neutron interactions and reduce the background signal due to spallation. This would allow the collaboration to probe the DSNB at lower energy thresholds, possibly as low as 11.5 MeV before the background begins to dominate the signal once again.

=== Hyper-Kamiokande ===
In 2021, the Kamioka Observatory began construction on the next generation water Cherenkov detector, known as Hyper-Kamiokande (HK). This new detector will feature a drastically larger amount of water as its predecessor, Super-Kamiokande, with 266 kilotons of water in its tank. With hopes to measure neutrino interactions and the DSNB with much more precision and lower background noise, the HK detector is set to begin collecting data some time in 2027.

=== Kamioka Liquid Scintillator Antineutrino Detector (KamLAND) ===
Another branch of the Kamioka Observatory is the KamLAND detector, which aims to detect electron antineutrinos using a large liquid scintillator. The interactions measured by the detector are inverse beta decays; this antineutrino-proton interaction produces a neutron and a positron, which emits scintillation light that can then be measured by the array of PMTs surrounding the liquid scintillator to determine the incident energy of the incoming antineutrino.

In 2021, the collaboration published results of their data from multiple electron antineutrino detections. The detections range from antineutrino energies of 8.3–30.8 MeV, which resulted in the strictest limits placed yet on the DSNB antineutrino flux for the energy range from 8.3–13.3 MeV. The table below shows the tabulated results from the KamLAND collaboration.

Antineutrino flux limits from KamLAND
$\bar{\nu}_e$ energy	Flux Upper Limit at 90% CL
(MeV)	( 1/( cm² s MeV ))
8.3–9.3	98.1
9.3–10.3	9.5
10.3–11.3	23.8
11.3–12.3	11.2
12.3–13.3	19.8

=== Sudbury Neutrino Observatory (SNO) ===
The Sudbury Neutrino Observatory (SNO) is an observatory in Canada that utilizes heavy water to observe solar neutrinos and study neutrino oscillations. The detections from SNO rely on charge current (CC) interactions, neutral current (NC) interactions, and elastic electron scattering. The primary focus of this experiment is not necessarily probing for detection of the DSNB, but the neutrino data collected allowed the research team to place limitations on the DSNB neutrino flux at a specific energy interval. In 2006, SNO placed an upper limit on the flux of $2.7 \bar{\nu_e} \, \mathrm{cm}^{-2} \, \mathrm{s}^{-1}$ for the neutrino energies between 22.9 and 36.9 MeV.

=== Borexino ===
Borexino is a liquid scintillator detector at Laboratori Nazionali del Gran Sasso in Italy that focuses on detecting solar neutrinos, specifically those produced through the electron-capture decay of ^{7}Be. Though not the primary objective of the experiment, the detector can accurately observe core-collapse supernova neutrinos allowing the collaboration to place limits on the DSNB flux. Based on two DSNB models and collected data, different upper limits for were placed on the flux for neutrino energy ranges of 2.8 to 16.8 MeV as well as a narrower range of 7.8 to 16.8 MeV. For 2.8 to 16.8 MeV, the more conservative upper flux limit of the two models was found to be $2.6 \times 10^3 \bar{\nu_e} \, \mathrm{cm}^{-2} \, \mathrm{s}^{-1}$, and the 7.8 to 16.8 MeV the more conservative estimate of the two models yielded an upper limit of a flux of $112.3 \bar{\nu_e} \, \mathrm{cm}^{-2} \, \mathrm{s}^{-1}$.

== See also ==
- Cosmic neutrino background
- Supernova neutrinos
