= Sheldon Stone =

American particle physicist (1946–2021)

- Born: February 14, 1946; Brooklyn, New York
- Died: October 6, 2021 (aged 75)
- Education: Brooklyn College; University of Rochester
- Spouse: Marina Artuso
- Awards: Panofsky Prize (2019)
- Scientific career
- Fields: Elementary particle physics High energy physics
- Workplaces: Syracuse University; CERN; Fermilab; Cornell University; Vanderbilt University
- Thesis: Strange particle and π− meson production in 12.7 GeV/c Kp interactions. (1972)
- Doctoral advisor: Thomas Ferbel
- Doctoral students: Daniela Bortoletto
- Website: Official Website

Sheldon Leslie Stone (February 14, 1946 – October 6, 2021) was a distinguished professor of physics at Syracuse University. He is best known for his work in experimental elementary particle physics, the Large Hadron Collider beauty experiment (LHCb), and B decays. He made significant contributions in the areas of data analysis, LHCb detector design and construction, and phenomenology.

== Biography ==
Stone earned a B.S. in physics from the Brooklyn College in 1967 and completed his PhD in 1972 at the University of Rochester under the guidance of Thomas Ferbel.

Stone began his career as an assistant professor of physics in 1973 at Vanderbilt University, where he stayed until 1979. He moved to Cornell's Laboratory for Nuclear Studies as a senior research associate. He moved to Syracuse University in 1991 and led the Experimental High Energy Physics Group at Syracuse from 1993 until his death in 2021. Since 2011, he served as the Distinguished Professor of Physics at Syracuse.

He served as the CLEO physics analysis coordinator in 1988 and made significant contributions to data analysis and detector construction (such as the CLEO particle detectors at the electron storage ring at Cornell University. He served as co-spokesperson from 2007-2008.

He also was co-spokesperson of the BTeV experiment at the Fermilab from 1997 until it was terminated in 2005. He was a member of the Fermilab PAC, board of overseers, and board of directors.

In 2005, Stone became a LHCb collaborator and served as the Upgrade coordinator from 2008-2011, during which time the project was organized and the letter of intent submitted. From 2011 to 2012, he was on leave from Syracuse as a scientific associate at CERN. He died on October 6, 2021, at the age of 75.

== Research ==
Stone had a leading role in many important discoveries such as the observation of the B^{+}, B^{0}, and D_{s} mesons. In 2000, he pushed to convert CLEO into a charm factory, which subsequently led to the measurement of the charm-decay constants f_{D+} and f_{Ds}. These measurements demonstrated the applicability of lattice-QCD calculations of hadronic effects in the weak decays of hadrons with a heavy quark with precision of a few-percent, thereby enabling similar calculations to be used with confidence to interpret key measurements by other flavour-physics experiments worldwide. At CLEO, Stone led the design and construction of new high-performance Th-doped near-4π CsI calorimeter detectors. This was the first application of a precision electromagnetic calorimeter to a general-purpose magnetic spectrometer. He also worked on design and construction of a Ring-imaging Cherenkov detector providing four-σ K-π separation over the full accessible momentum range.

In 2015, Stone was involved in the discovery of the pentaquark at CERN. Five-quark resonances, called pentaquarks, were predicted at the dawn of the quark model but were only found after 50 years when Stone and a small team of colleagues uncovered their existence in the LHCb dataset.

In 2021, Stone was part of a LHCb team that unexpectedly discovered the exotic narrow double-charm tetraquark (T^{+}_{cc}, ccu̅d̅), a type of long-lived tetraquark, in experiments conducted at the Large Hadron Collider.

== Awards ==
In 2019, Stone received the Panofsky Prize in Experimental Particle Physics of the APS for "transformative contributions to flavor physics and hadron spectroscopy, in particular through intellectual leadership on detector construction and analysis on the CLEO and Large Hadron Collider beauty (LHCb) experiments, and for the long-standing, deeply influential advocacy for flavor physics at hadron colliders".

He was elected a fellow of the American Physical Society (APS) in 1993 for "outstanding contributions to the study of b-quark decays".

== Works ==
- Stone, Sheldon (1994). B Decays (2nd ed.). World Scientific. doi:10.1142/1441. ISBN 9789810213305. OCLC 636743000.
