= Raphael M. Littauer =

American particle physicist (1925–2009)

Raphael Max Littauer
- Born: November 28, 1925; Leipzig, Germany
- Died: October 19, 2009 (aged 83); Trumansburg, New York, U.S.
- Citizenship: originally Germany; later United States
- Education: University of Cambridge
- Known for: Particle physics; accelerators; university teaching of physics
- Spouse: S. Alexandra Littauer
- Children: 2
- Scientific career
- Fields: Physics
- Workplaces: Cornell University

Raphael Max Littauer (November 28, 1925 – October 19, 2009) was an American physicist who was a longtime Professor of Physics and Nuclear Studies at Cornell University. He was involved in the development of several particle accelerators there, in particular the 10 GeV electron synchrotron at the Wilson Synchrotron Lab in the late 1960s, where he devised a distributed, multiplexed control system for it, and the Cornell Electron Storage Ring (CESR) in the late 1970s and early 1980s, where his scheme to create pretzel-shaped orbits to increase the number of particle bunches in circulation contributed significantly to CESR having the highest luminosity of any accelerator of its era. Littauer was also known for his teaching, including the design, implementation, and installation of one of the earliest and most successful classroom response systems. An active opponent of the Vietnam War, he led a group at Cornell that published a well-regarded study on the nature and effects of the U.S. air attacks in Southeast Asia. In 1991 he became a Fellow of the American Physical Society and in 1995 he received the Robert R. Wilson Prize for Achievement in the Physics of Particle Accelerators.

== Early life and education ==
Littauer was born in Leipzig, Germany, on November 28, 1925. In March 1939 he emigrated to the United Kingdom, six months before the outbreak of World War II. According to what his daughter later related, he was part of the Kindertransport and was taken in by a family in England.

He attended the University of Cambridge beginning in 1943. He first received an M.A. degree, that being awarded in 1946. He then earned a Ph.D. from Christ's College at Cambridge in 1950, the title of his dissertation being Levels in Light Elements. During this time he worked as an assistant in the famed Cavendish Laboratory.

== Marriage and family ==
Littauer married Salome Alexandra Kroch in 1950. Also born in Leipzig, she and her two sisters had endured a hazardous journey through Europe in order to survive the Holocaust.

Littauer left England for the United States in 1950, becoming a research associate at Cornell University. Together he and his wife had two children. The couple lived in Ithaca, New York. Alexandra Littauer taught French in the younger grades of the Ithaca City School District and later became an instructor in French at Cornell.

Raphael Littauer became a United States citizen in 1956.

== Career as physicist ==
=== Accelerators and positions ===
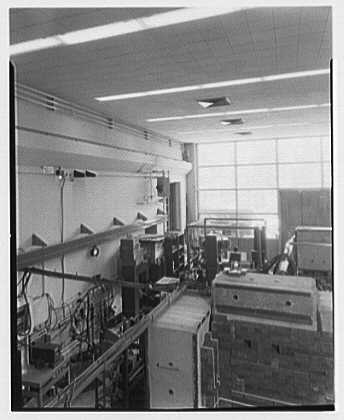
A room within the Laboratory of Nuclear Studies at Cornell, 1952

Littauer's arrival at Cornell in 1950 was in order to do work on an electron accelerator at Cornell's Laboratory for Nuclear Studies, which had been founded after World War II by scientists returning to academic life following their efforts at Los Alamos. The director of that laboratory, Robert R. Wilson, was instrumental in bringing Littauer there. At the time Cornell had a 300 MeV electron synchrotron, which was followed in 1952 by a new 1.3 GeV synchrotron.

In 1954, Littauer departed Cornell to work on a synchrotron at the General Electric Research Laboratory in Schenectady, New York. But in 1955, Littauer returned to Cornell for good, being appointed a member of the faculty as a Research Associate Professor of Physics. Once again, Wilson played a role in his return.

In 1963, Littauer was named a research professor. Then in 1965, he became a full professor, being named a professor of Physics and Nuclear Studies.

Littauer was awarded two postdoctoral fellowships from the National Science Foundation. The second of these, in 1968, involved work at the Laboratori Nazionali di Frascati in Italy. There he spent a semester working on the laboratory's new 1.5 GeV electron-positron colliding beam accelerator.

Later in 1968, Cornell's Wilson Synchrotron Laboratory saw the dedication of its new 10 GeV electron synchrotron, the largest and most powerful such one in the world, with Littauer highlighted as one of the people who helped develop it. The ring was built underneath Schoellkopf Field and other athletic facilities on campus. Among Littauer's responsibilities were monitoring and adjusting the steering coils located around the synchrotron's ring . As part of his work, Littauer created a time-sharing, distributed, multiplex control system for the synchrotron that helped reduce both the initial and ongoing costs of the system.

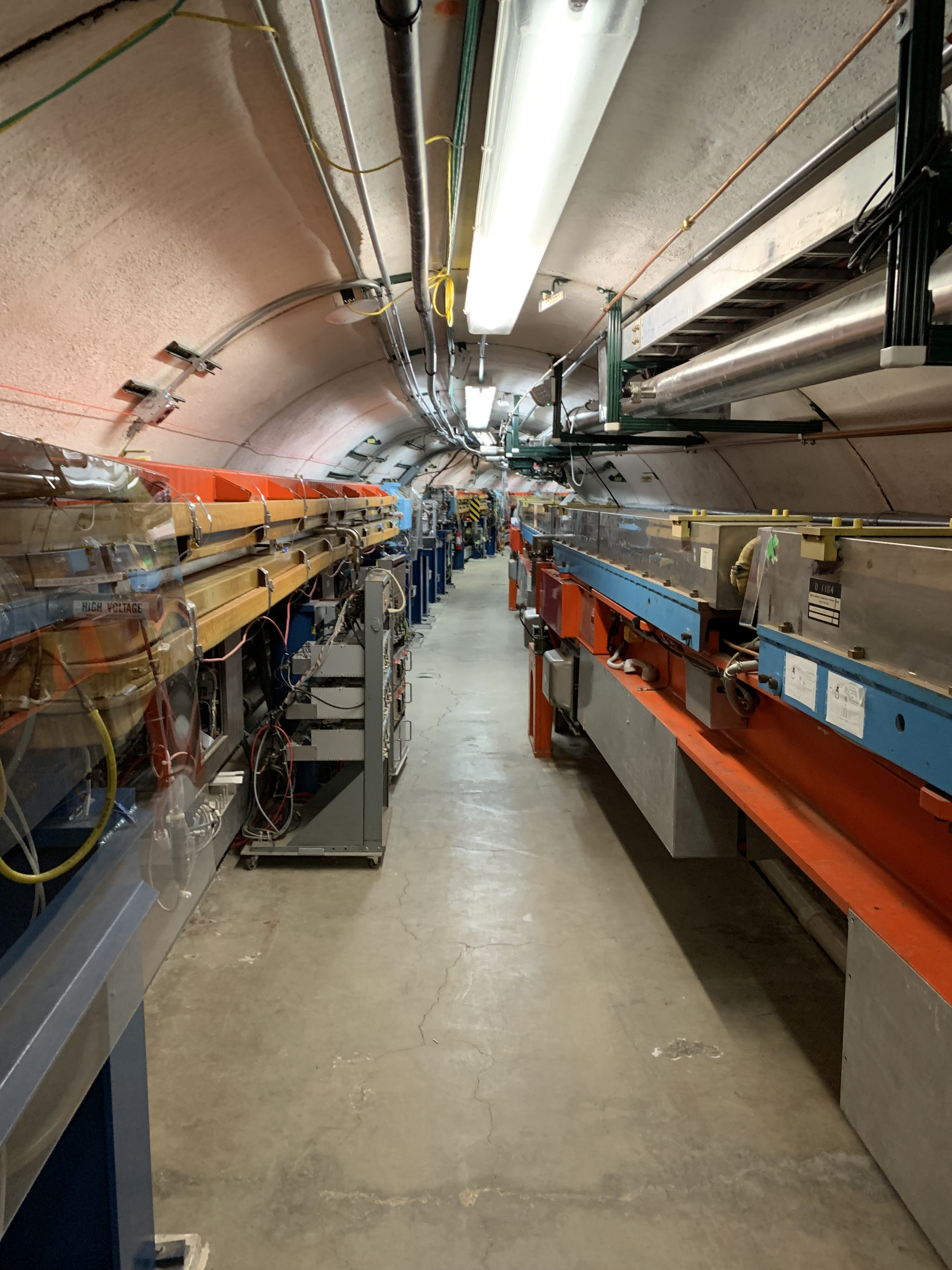
A portion of the Cornell Electron Storage Ring (CESR) tunnel, as seen in 2023

The Cornell Electron Storage Ring (CESR) came into operation at the end of 1970s but initially featured disappointing luminosity, so over the next several years several improvements to it were made. One of them, put into place in 1983, was Littauer's development of a scheme for so-called "pretzel orbits" (a name he came up with). This involved having multiple bunches of particles in a storage ring, but introducing electrostatic separators at key places in the ring such that two counter-circulating beams are displaced in eccentric and opposite directions, thereby limiting the number of collisions in a rotation and increasing the number of bunches that can be in circulation. With this among other improvements, throughout the 1990s, CESR had the highest luminosity of any colliding-beam system in the world and became valuable as a synchrotron light source The pretzel orbits scheme was subsequently embraced and successfully incorporated into the Tevatron particle accelerator at Fermilab and the Large Electron–Positron Collider at CERN.

Overall, the physicist Maury Tigner has described Littauer as someone who was "very much interested in accelerators and was ... a pioneering controls designer and builder."

In 1974, Littauer was elected chair of Cornell's department of physics, a department which held 47 faculty members at the time. He remained in that position for three years.

=== Research ===
In addition to his work on accelerator construction and operation, Littauer was the author or co-author of a number of articles in physics journals. In 1958, he was one of several groups that published results regarding nucleon resonances, finding and establishing the properties of the state latter known as N(1520).

=== Teaching ===
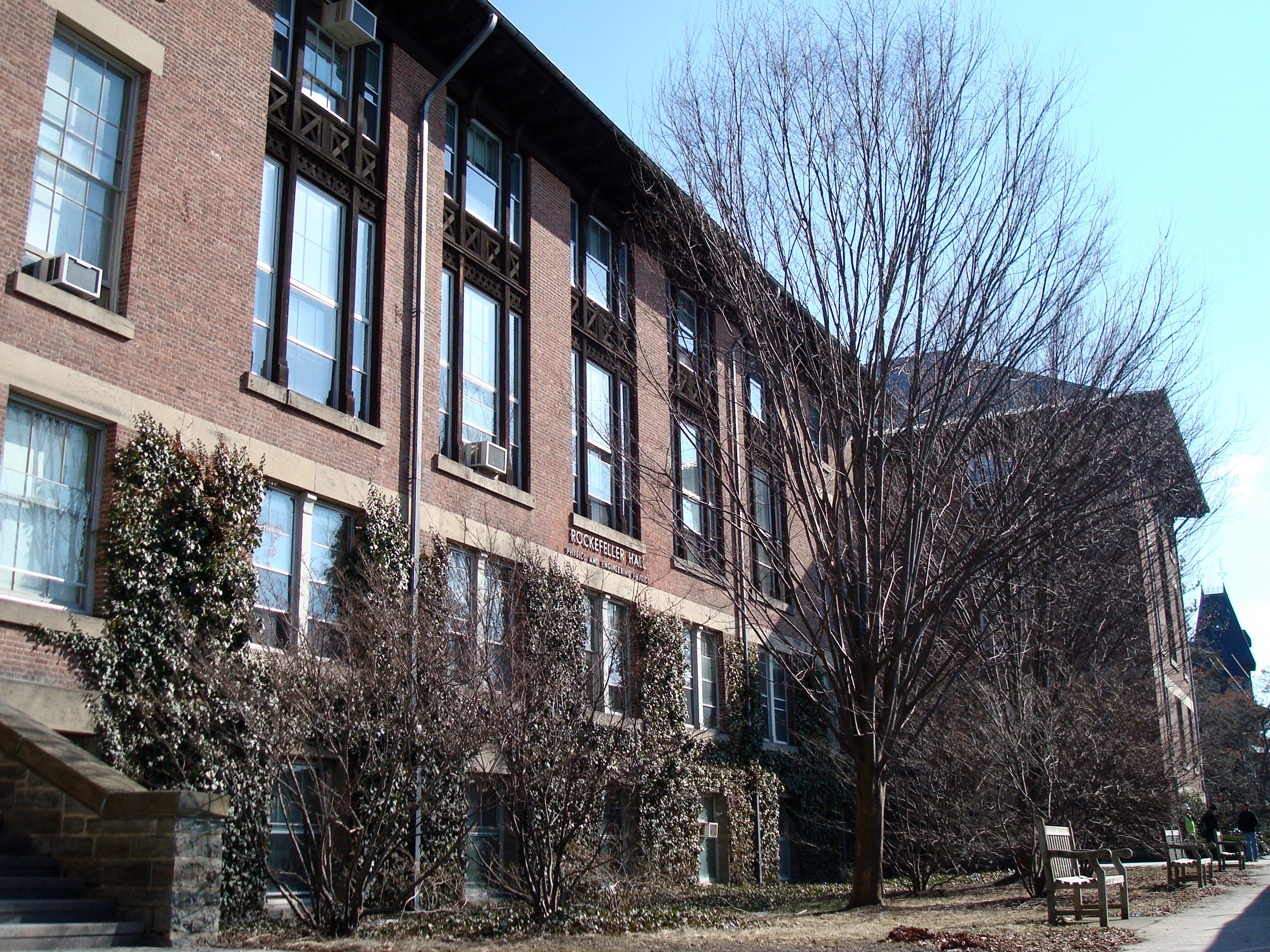
Rockefeller Hall on the Cornell campus, where Littauer's electronic classroom response system was installed

Littauer had a longtime interest in how the teaching of physics, and teaching in general, could be improved. This included giving out lecture notes that emphasized scientific understanding coming out of mathematical formulae and experiments that could be performed in class.

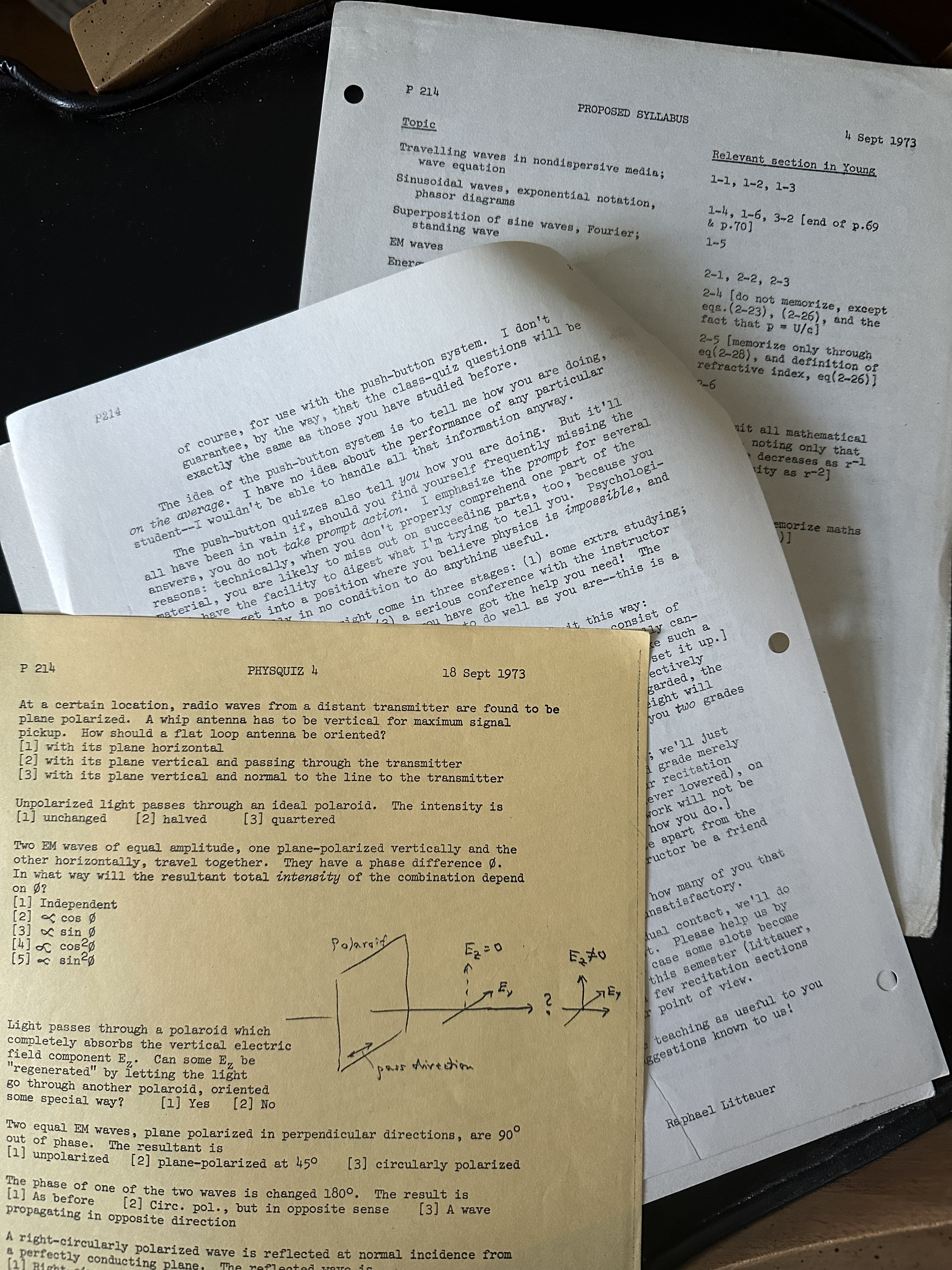
Physics 214: Optics, Waves, and Particles, Fall 1973: Littauer's syllabus, notes on the classroom response system, and a handout with an instance of the response system questions and answer choices

Having seen that large lecture hall courses such as those given at Cornell tended to result in disengaged or absent students, during 1971 Littauer designed, built, and introduced an electronic classroom response system into his teaching of physics. It allowed the instructor to pose multiple-choice questions to the students, from which they would push buttons at their seats to anonymously register what they thought the answer was, giving the instructor immediate feedback as to students' level of understanding of the material being presented. The system was meant for large lecture classes and was permanently installed, with the location being the Rockefeller B room in the campus's Rockefeller Hall. As such, it was the first such response system at Cornell, and one of the first such anywhere in the country. In Fall 1972, Littauer published an account of the system, including photographs of the apparatus as it appeared both to students in their seats and to the teacher at the lectern, in the journal Educational Technology. He continued to use it in all his classes.

More so than with most such early efforts, Littauer's system was successful, with one later analysis attributing that success to the fact that the designer of the system was also the teacher who used it. Although other audience response technologies emerged over time and were utilized at Cornell, Littauer's system was still in place and in use within Rockefeller B some three decades later.

== Anti-war activities ==
In 1962, Littauer was one of two dozen Cornell professors that signed onto a Committee for Peaceful Alternatives, an entity that was looking to run a candidate for New York's 33rd congressional district in the 1962 United States House of Representatives elections who would have better ideas for finding a solution to the nuclear arms race. Littauer also became a national council member of the Federation of American Scientists.

With opposition to United States involvement in the Vietnam War being a major issue on American campuses, Littauer became one of the more outspoken members of the faculty in this regard. This including him being one of a number of physics faculty who stated they would not engage in teaching activities during the Moratorium to End the War in Vietnam in October 1969 and instead encouraged others to join them.

Starting in May 1971, Littauer headed the Air War Study Group, which was sponsored by Cornell's Center for International Studies and consisted of a 19-person group of professors and students who investigated the nature of the air attacks being conducted by the United States in the Vietnam War. They used only unclassified sources and discussions; as part of this Littauer made trips to Washington to interview participants. The report from the five-month study was distributed privately in November 1971; it established that despite the ongoing Vietnamization of the ground effort, the United States was still maintaining the air war with large numbers of munitions being delivered, akin to 1967 levels, but that these attacks were ineffective at halting Communist operations in Vietnam, Laos, and Cambodia. The report was written in a matter-of-fact way; while it was motivated by opposition to the war, Littauer said the study group was trying to be scholarly and fair in their work.

The study was subsequently revised and updated and published as The Air War in Indochina in August 1972 by the Beacon Press. By now the study group comprised some 21 scholars encompassing a number of different academic fields. Littauer was joined as editor of the volume by Norman Uphoff, a young professor of government at Cornell. A lengthy, front-page assessment of the volume in a positive vein appeared in the New York Times Book Review.

In a September 1972 op-ed run by the Los Angeles Times News Service, Littauer decried the air war as "remote, inefficient and indiscriminate", especially in the use of aerial gunships, cluster bombs, napalm, and B-52 Arc Light saturation bombing. Littauer did acknowledge the advent of "smart" laser-guided bombs as an improvement, but noted that their existence was not lowering the amount of conventional bombing being done. Decades later, the study was still being used as a source for analyses of the U.S. air effort.

== Later years and honors ==
In 1991, Littauer was elected a Fellow of the American Physical Society. The citation for the achievement read, "For outstanding contributions to accelerator control systems, architecture and electronics, and in the use of feedback to cure instabilities."

In 1995, Littauer was awarded the Robert R. Wilson Prize for Achievement in the Physics of Particle Accelerators. The citation on the prize, also from the American Physical Society, read, "For his many contributions to accelerator technology, in particular his innovative conception and implementation of a mechanism to provide multifold increases in the luminosity of single-ring colliding beam facilities by the establishment of separated orbits of opposing, manу-bunch, particle beams. [...] the concept has been adopted, equally successfully, at the other high energy physics facilities of the world."

Littauer became a professor emeritus of Physics, but remained active in efforts to improve undergraduate education at Cornell. As part of this he maintained an interest in networked classroom technology.

Littauer died on October 19, 2009, at his home in Trumansburg, New York. His wife Alexandra had died four years earlier.

== Selected publications ==
- Accelerators: Machines of Nuclear Physics (Anchor Books, 1960) [co-author with Robert R. Wilson]
- Pulse Electronics (McGraw-Hill, 1965)
- The Air War in Indochina (Beacon Press, 1972) [co-editor with Norman Uphoff]
