= Helen T. Edwards =

American physicist

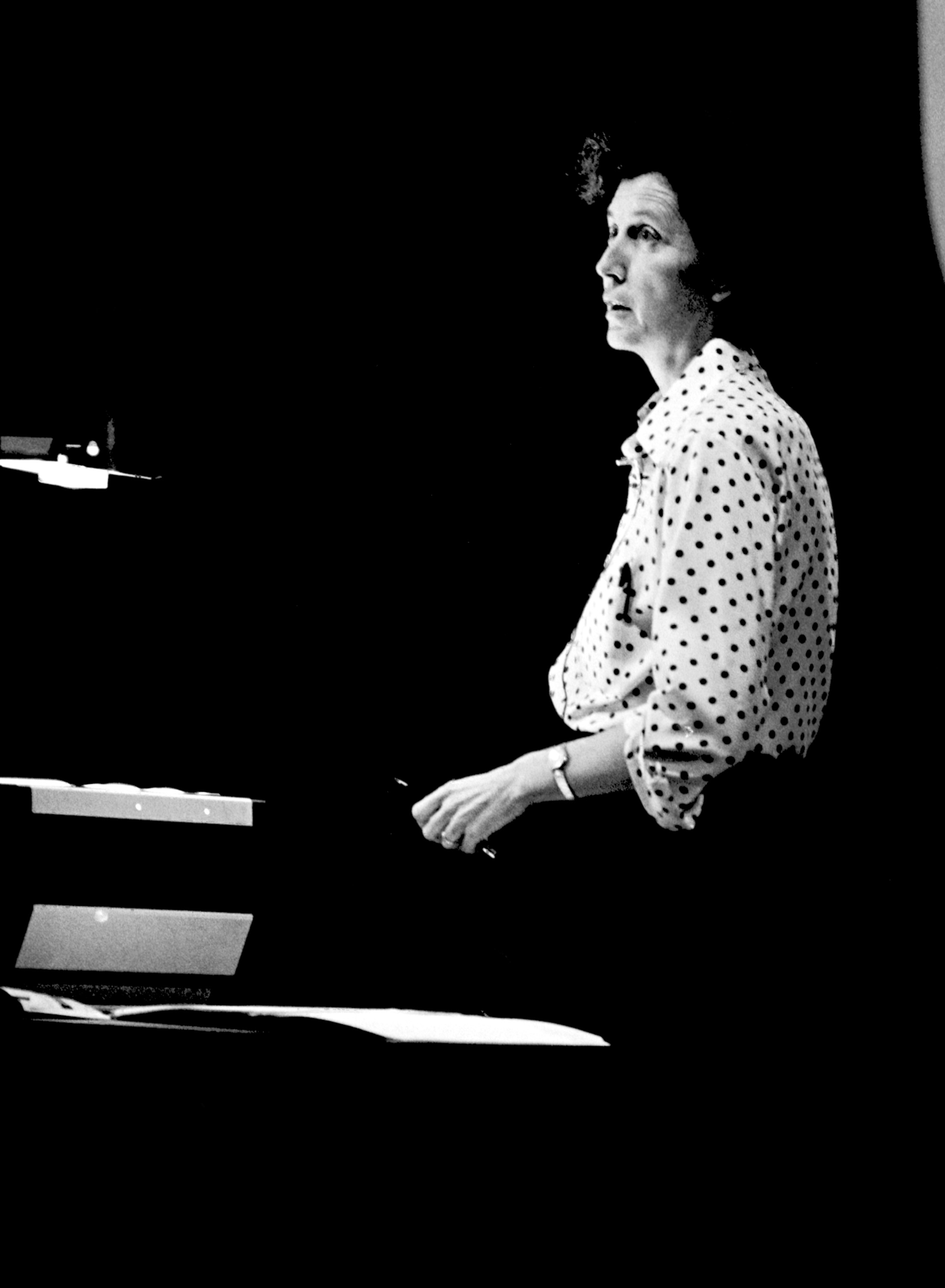
- Physicist Helen Edwards speaking at the 12th International Conference on High-Energy Accelerators at Fermilab on August 14, 1983
- Born: May 27, 1936; Detroit, Michigan
- Died: June 21, 2016 (aged 80); Illinois, US
- Education: Cornell University
- Spouse: Donald A. Edwards
- Awards: E. O. Lawrence Award (1986); MacArthur Foundation Fellowship, National Medal of Technology
- Scientific career
- Fields: Accelerator physics
- Workplaces: Fermi National Accelerator Laboratory

Helen Thom Edwards (May 27, 1936 – June 21, 2016) was an American physicist. She is best known for her role as the lead scientist in the design and construction of the Tevatron at the Fermi National Accelerator Laboratory, which was the most powerful particle collider in the world until 2009.

== Early life and education ==
Helen Thom was born on May 27, 1936, in Detroit, Michigan to Mary Milner Thom and Edgar Robertson Thom. The youngest of five siblings, Helen spent much of her early life in Pontiac, Michigan until her family moved to a ranch in Metamora, Michigan. Thom attended the Kingswood School (now the Cranbrook Schools) in Bloomfield Hills, Michigan until 1950, when she transferred to The Madeira School in McLean, Virginia. At Madeira, Thom served as vice-head of student government and fire chief, while also participating in varsity hockey, basketball, and horseback riding. Thom's struggles with dyslexia, a learning disorder that was widely misunderstood at the time, led her parents to believe that she was not very bright. However, despite her distaste for reading and writing, Thom excelled in mathematics and science.

After graduating from The Madeira School in 1953, Thom pursued her undergraduate studies at Cornell University, where she earned a B.S. in physics in 1957. She remained at Cornell to continue her education, working with cosmic ray specialist Kenneth Greisen on the development of electromagnetic showers. Helen met her husband, Donald Edwards, while working at the Laboratory of Nuclear Studies during her masters; they married in 1963, the same year she completed her M.S. in physics. Edwards subsequently began her doctoral studies under Boyce McDaniel in the Laboratory of Nuclear Studies at Cornell University. In 1966, at the age of 30, Edwards completed her Ph.D. in Experimental Physics.

== Research and career ==
After earning her Ph.D, Edwards continued her work in the Laboratory of Nuclear Studies at Cornell University as a research associate. Working under Robert R. Wilson, she contributed to the final stages of the 10 GeV Synchrotron project helping to develop the "resonant beam extraction" technique, which enabled physicists to extract high-energy beams from circular accelerators. In 1967, the first particle beam circulated in the Synchrotron, and by March 1968, the accelerated reached its full energy potential of 10 GeV, the highest recorded for an electron synchrotron at the time.

That same year, Wilson, who had become the founding director of the National Laboratory (later renamed Fermi National Accelerator Laboratory, or Fermilab), invited both Helen Edwards and her husband, Donald Edwards, to join him at the institution. In 1970, Helen was appointed Associate Head of the Booster Section by Wilson, where she initially worked to build the lab's 8 GeV Booster. The accelerator successfully launched its first beam at 7 GeV in June 1971, and reached its full potential of 200 GeV by March 1972. Edwards's most significant contribution was her leadership in the design, construction, and operation of the Tevatron, which was the world's first successful superconducting synchrotron and the most powerful particle collider in the world for 26 years. The Tevatron was built directly beneath the Main Ring at Fermilab and boasted a circumference of about 6.5 km, or 4 miles. Using superconducting magnets to accelerate protons and antiprotons at 1 trillion electron volts (TeV), particles could reach 99.999954% of the speed of light. Traveling at such high speeds, particles collided at about 2 TeV to create energy levels similar to those of the atoms from a fraction of a second after the Big Bang. As hypothesized by the Standard Model, these collisions would provide insight into the simplest building block of matter: the interior of atoms themselves.

On July 5, 1979, the US Department of Energy authorized the Tevatron's construction, and Leon M. Lederman, Fermilab's second director, placed Edwards in charge of the project. Among her significant contributions to the design and implementation of the Tevatron, she developed a system that enabled the Tevatron to detect antiprotons and protons from different sources nearly simultaneously. According to Paul Czarapata, an engineer who worked at Fermilab alongside Edwards, "[Helen] was behind everything that happened every day. Sometimes I wondered if she lived there 24 hours a day." On March 18, 1983, the final magnet was installed on the Tevatron, creating a total of 774 superconducting magnets. Each magnet contained over 20 miles of superconducting wire in the Rutherford cable form; in total, Fermilab is estimated to have purchased 95% of the niobium-titanium ever produced in human history. In July 1983, the machine fired its first particles, reaching a world-record energy of 512 GeV. Physicist Dmitri Denisov, who helped update the Tevatron, notes that "The Tevatron is the particle physics equivalent of landing on the moon. We achieved something that, scientifically and technically, wasn't possible before." The Tevatron recorded its first proton-antiproton collisions in 1985 and was used to find the top quark in 1995 and the tau neutrino in 2000. Using the mass of the top quark from the Tevatron, physicists were able to calculate the mass of the crucial Higgs boson.

In 1987, Edwards became head of the Accelerator Division, continuing to lead the research on the Tevatron. Between 1989 and 1991, she served as Technical Director of the 54-mile Superconducting Super Collider in Texas, which aimed to create collisions at 40 TeV. However, the project fell short due to funding cuts. After 1992, Edwards continued her work at Fermilab as a guest scientist, where she made significant contributions to the development of high-gradient, superconducting linear accelerators as well as bright, intense electron sources. She collaborated with scientists at DESY in Hamburg, Germany to develop the TESLA superconducting linear collider and the photoinjector for the TESLA Test Facility (FLASH).

In September 2011, the Tevatron was shut down, marking the end of its groundbreaking contributions to particle physics. Edwards, wearing a cowboy hat in homage to the nickname for the Accelerator Division team, pushed the button to halt its operations.

== Positions ==
- 1966-70 Research Associate, 10 GEV Electron Synchrotron, Cornell University
- 1970-87 Associate Head of the Booster Group, Fermi National Accelerator Laboratory
- 1987-89 Head, Accelerator Division, Fermi National Accelerator Laboratory
- 1988 MacArthur Fellow
- 1989-92 Head & Associate Director, Superconducting Division, Superconducting Super Collider Laboratory, Dallas
- 1992–2010 Guest scientist, Fermi National Accelerator Laboratory

== Awards and honors ==
- USPAS Prize for Achievement in Accelerator Physics and Technology (1985)
- E. O. Lawrence Award, U.S. Department of Energy (1986)
- MacArthur Foundation Fellowship (1988)
- Elected to the National Academy of Engineering (1988)
- National Medal of Technology (1989)
- American Academy of Arts and Sciences (1996)
- Robert R. Wilson Prize for Achievement in the Physics of Particle Accelerators Recipient from the American Physical Society (2003)

Six years after Edwards's death, a bill was introduced in the US Senate and US House of Representatives in 2022 to rename Fermilab's Integrated Engineering Research Center in honor of the late Helen Edwards. Additionally, Fermilab established the Helen Edwards Summer Internship, which provides students studying physics and engineering in Europe with the opportunity to work with scientists at Fermilab.

== Personal life ==
Helen met Donald Edwards, a doctoral student at Cornell, while working in the Laboratory of Nuclear Studies during her master's program. The couple married in 1963 and collaborated on numerous projects throughout their careers, including their work at Fermilab.

In 1992, Helen and Donald Edwards retired in Montana, where Helen, a lifelong nature lover, pursued her passion for photographing wildlife. Despite retiring, they continued contributing to the field as guest scientists at Fermilab until 2010.

In 2001, Helen and Donald demonstrated their enduring commitment to the advancement of the field by endowing a chair in accelerator physics at their alma mater, Cornell University.

== Selected publications ==
- "Bypass For the Doubler or Main Ring" (Jul 1973)
- "Injection and Stacking in the 30 To 7--GeV Storage Ring" (Jul 1973)
- "Injection and Extraction For the Energy Doubler" (Jul 1973)
- "Injection and Stacking in the Large Storage Rings" (Jul 1973)
- "Beam Extraction" (May 1974)
- "Proposal for Satellite Refrigeration Control Interface" (Sep 1979)
- "Design of the energy doubler" (Jan 1979)
- "The Energy Saver Test and Commissioning History" (Aug 1983)
- "The Tevatron Energy Doubler: A Superconducting Accelerator" (Dec 1985)
- "The Fermilab Tevatron and PBAR Source: Status Report" (Aug 1986)
- "The Fermilab Tevatron and Pbar Source Status Report" (Aug 1986)
- "The Superconducting Super Collider" (June 1990)
- "SSC design status" (1990)
- "Study on Beam Tube Vacuum with Consideration of Synchrotron Light, Potential Liner Intercept, and Collider Quad/Spool Coil Diameter" (Aug 1991)
- "Progress report on the TESLA test facility" (May 1993)
- "TESLA parameters update: A Progress report on the TESLA collider design" (1994)
- "A Report on Fermilab SRF Activities and Proposals" (Nov 1999)
- "The superconducting TESLA cavities" (Mar 2000)
- "RF Superconductivity: Enabling Technology for the Future" (May 2003)
- "International Linear Collider Reference Design Report Volume 2: Physics at the ILC" (Sep 2007)
- "Operation of a free-electron laser from the extreme ultraviolet to the water window" (2007)
