= Robert R. Wilson Prize =

American science award

The Robert R. Wilson Prize for Achievement in the Physics of Particle Accelerators is an annual prize established in 1987 by the American Physical Society (APS) to recognize and encourage outstanding achievement, ordinarily by one person but sometimes to two or more physicists who have contributed to the same accomplishment, in the physics of particle accelerators. The prize consists of $10,000, a travel allowance to the APS meeting where the prize is formally awarded, and a certificate citing the prize-winning contributions of the recipient. The prize is named in honor of Robert R. Wilson.

== Recipients ==
Year	Name	Citation
1987	Ernest Courant	For his key role in the invention of the principle of Alternating Gradient Focusing, and his pioneering work in particle beam dynamics. This invention and the subsequent development of particle accelerators has made possible the exploration of the elementary constituents of matter, at the nuclear and subnuclear level, which has led to our new understanding of Elementary Particle Physics. It has also led to application of accelerators to many areas of science and technology such as Synchrotron Light Sources.
1988	Donald William Kerst	For his many contributions to accelerator physics, including the development of the betatron (1940); his seminal paper (with Serber) on Orbit Dynamics in Circular Accelerators (1941); his leadership in the design and construction of a series of machines at the University of Illinois (through 1950); and his work as Technical Director of the Midwestern Universities Research Association (1953 - 1957) from which came, from his own work and from his stimulation of others, many of the most important accelerator physics developments of the 1950’s.
1989	Alvin Tollestrup, Martin N. Wilson	For their outstanding achievement in the development of the basic understanding of the mechanical and thermodynamic properties of superconductors and the development of construction methods and quality control for their use in large pulsed high field magnets. This important accomplishment opened the door for the economical construction of high energy particle accelerator facilities such as the Fermilab Tevatron and other machines of even higher energy.
1990	Kjell Johnsen	For his seminal contributions to the physics, design, construction and performance of the CERN proton Intersecting Storage Rings (ISR). This highly successful and first high energy hadron collider broke the ground for even larger machines of this type which are now in operation or in the planning state, opening new frontiers in particle physics.
1991	John Reginald Richardson	For his original contributions to the development of cyclotrons. These include the first experimental demonstration of phase stability, the first synchrocyclotron, and the first sector-focused cyclotron. The work is the basis of the numerous cyclotrons that have had and continue to have major impact on nuclear physics, solid state physics, chemistry, and medicine.
1992	Rolf Wideröe	For his many contributions to accelerator physics and technology beginning in the 1920’s, including the development of betatrons, radio frequency acceleration in linacs and later in synchrotrons. Injection and extraction from circular accelerators and the colliding beam concept. His development of radio frequency acceleration was a fundamental step towards modern accelerators from linacs and synchrotrons to storage rings.
1993	John P. Blewett	For his many contributions, beginning in the 1930’s to accelerator physics and technology. These contributions include the experimental verification and first indirect observation of synchrotron radiation, the first application of the Alternating Gradient Focusing Concept to linear accelerators, and very many developments in the design and construction of accelerators and storage rings.
1994	Gustav-Adolf Voss, Thomas L. Collins	For seminal contributions to the principles of optical design that led to the development of high luminosity interaction regions for colliding-beam storage rings. The insight to suggest a simple way of introducing straight sections into otherwise periodic lattices was developed first at the Cambridge Electron Accelerator shortly after the invention of the alternating gradient principle. This important step was followed by the invention of the high-luminosity low-beta scheme. These combined efforts have led to the development of the high luminosity interaction regions of modern colliding-beam storage rings.
1995	Raphael Littauer	For his many contributions to accelerator technology, in particular his innovative conception and implementation of a mechanism to provide multifold increases in the luminosity of single-ring colliding beam facilities by the establishment of separated orbits of opposing, many-bunch, particle beams. This work has enabled toe Cornell Electron Storage Ring (CESR) to achieve record luminosities for electron-positron storage rings; the concept has been adopted, equally successfully, at the other high energy physics facilities of the world.
1996	Albert Josef Hofmann	For his numerous experimental techniques developed to elucidate collective phenomena in accelerators and storage rings; in particular, the experimental determination of beam impedances and methods for controlling the instabilities that limit beam intensities. His theoretical insights and experimental innovations have led directly to higher intensities in many circular accelerators and storage rings for both particle physics and synchrotron radiation production. As a superb teacher and mentor, he has been unfailingly generous in conveying his knowledge and insight to others, especially younger physicists and engineers.
1997	Andrew Sessler	For a broad range of theoretical and conceptual advances in particle beam dynamics, leading to important accelerator performance improvements; for contributions in the areas of synchrotron rings, including negative mass instability and resistive wall instability, and free electron lasers; for the two-beam accelerator concept; for helping shape the very language of beam physics; and for inspiring and guiding several generations of accelerator scientists and serving as a statesman of science.
1998	Matthew Sands	For his many contributions to accelerator physics and the development of electron-positron and proton colliders and for his importance as teacher and role model for many generations of scientists.
1999	Robert Brian Palmer	For his many diverse contributions and innovations in particle accelerator and detector technologies, including superconducting magnets, longitudinal stochastic cooling, bubble chambers and neutrino beam lines, crab crossing in lepton colliders, laser acceleration, and for leadership of the muon collider concept.
2000	Maury Tigner	For notable contributions to the accelerator field as an inventor, designer, builder, and leader, including early pioneering developments in superconducting radio-frequency systems, inspiration and intellectual leadership for the construction of CESR, and leadership of the SSC Central Design Group.
2001	Claudio Pellegrini	For his pioneering work in the analysis of instabilities in electron storage rings, and his seminal and comprehensive development of the theory of free electron lasers.
2002	Alexander N. Skrinsky	For his major contribution to the invention and development of electron cooling and for his development and for his contributions to the physics of the electron-positron colliders at the Budker Institute.
2003	Helen T. Edwards	For her pivotal achievement and critical contribution as the leader in the design, construction, commissioning and operation of the Tevatron and for her continued contributions to the development of high gradient superconducting linear accelerators as well as bright and intense electron sources.
2004	John T. Seeman, Katsunobu Oide	For technical leadership and direct contributions to the development of high luminosity B-factories at KEK and SLAC. These machines have set new world records for luminosities in colliding-beam storage rings.
2005	Keith Symon	For fundamental contributions to accelerator science including the FFAG concept and the invention of the RF phase manipulation technique that was essential to the success of the ISR and all subsequent hadron colliders.
2006	Glen Lambertson	For fundamental contributions to accelerator science and technology particularly in the area of beam electrodynamics including the development of beam instrumentation for the feedback systems that are essential for the operation of high luminosity electron and hadron colliders.
2007	Lee C. Teng	For invention of resonant extraction and transition crossing techniques critical to hadron synchrotrons and storage rings, for early and continued development of linear matrix theory of particle beams, and for leadership in the realization of a facility for radiation therapy with protons.
2008	Lyn Evans	For a sustained career of technical innovation and leadership in the SPS proton-antiproton collider, culminating in the construction and commissioning of the LHC.
2009	Satoshi Ozaki	For his outstanding contribution to the design and construction of accelerators that has led to the realization of major machines for fundamental science on two continents, and his promotion of international collaboration.
2010	John Peoples	For critical and enduring efforts in making the Tevatron Collider the outstanding high energy physics accelerator of the last two decades.
2011	Yaroslav Derbenev	For a broad range of seminal contributions and innovations in beam physics, including theory and control of polarization with "Siberian snakes," electron and ionization cooling, round-to-flat beam transformations, FELs, and electron-ion colliders.
2012	John Madey	For the invention and first experimental demonstration of the free electron laser and important contributions to its conceptual development.
2013	John Galayda	For his leadership and outstanding and pioneering contributions to the development, construction and commissioning of the LCLS, the first X-ray FEL to lase at 0.15nm, and his contribution of the Advanced Photon Source and the National Synchrotron Light Source.
2014	Kwang-Je Kim	For his pioneering theoretical work in synchrotron radiation and free electron lasers that laid the foundation for both third and fourth generation x-ray sources.
2015	Hasan Padamsee	For his leadership and pioneering world-renowned research in superconducting radiofrequency physics, materials science, and technology, which contributed to remarkable advances in the capability of particle accelerators.
2016	Vasily Parkhomchuk	For crucial contributions in the proof of principle of electron cooling, for leading contribution to the experimental and theoretical development of electron cooling, and for achievement of the planned parameters of coolers for facilities in laboratories around the world.
2017	Anton Piwinski, James Bjorken, Sekazi Mtingwa	For the detailed, theoretical description of intrabeam scattering, which has empowered major discoveries in a broad range of disciplines by a wide variety of accelerators, including hadron colliders, damping rings/linear colliders, and low emittance synchrotron light sources.
2018	Alexander Chao	for insightful, fundamental and broad-ranging contributions to accelerator physics, including polarization, beam-beam effects, nonlinear dynamics, and collective instabilities, for tireless community leadership and for inspiring and educating generations of accelerator physicists.
2019	Toshiki Tajima	For the invention and leading the first realization of laser wakefield acceleration, which opened the way to compact acceleration applications such as ultrafast radiolysis, brilliant x-rays, intra-operative radiation therapy, wakefield beam dump, and high energy cosmic acceleration.
2020	Bruce Carlsten	For the discovery and subsequent implementation of emittance compensation in photoinjectors that has enabled the development of high brightness, X-ray free electron lasers such as the Linac Coherent Light Source.
2021	Yuri Fyodorovich Orlov	For pioneering innovation in accelerator theory and practice, including the independent development of the synchrotron radiation partition sum rule; seminal contributions to the muon g-2 experiment; deep understanding of beam and spin dynamics; consistently unique and fruitful ideas, ranging from the practical to the visionary; and embodying the spirit of scientific freedom.
2022	G. William Foster, Stephen D. Holmes	For leadership in developing the modern accelerator complex at Fermilab, enabling the success of the Tevatron program that supports rich programs in neutrino and precision physics.
2023	Alexander J. Dragt Sr.	For pioneering contributions to the development and application of Lie methods in accelerator physics and nonlinear dynamics.
2024	Kaoru Yokoya	For seminal contributions to the theory and control of beam polarization in electron storage rings, beam-beam interactions in linear colliders, crab-crossing and coherent beam-beam interactions in circular colliders, and bunched beam instabilities.
2025	Alexander Zholents	For many important contributions to particle accelerators and light sources, including ultra-fast X-ray techniques for electron beams and beam cooling methods.
2026	Jie Wei	For seminal contributions in the physics of high-intensity hadron accelerators, and for leadership in the development, construction, and commissioning of the world's highest power hadron accelerators, particularly the first continuous-wave superconducting linac for heavy ions above 200 MeV/nucleon.
