= John Peoples Jr. =

American physicist (1933–2025)

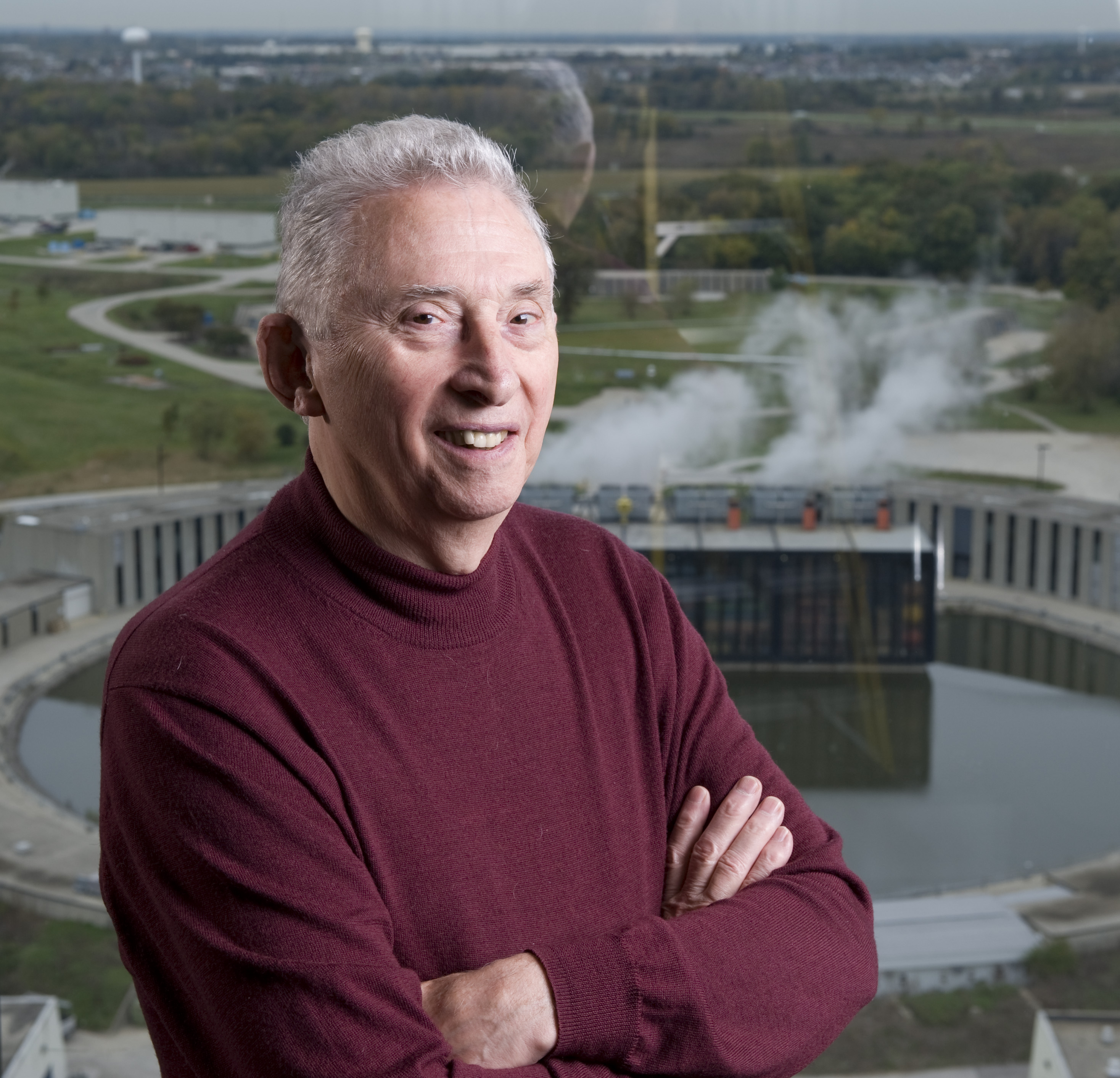
- Born: John Peoples Jr. January 22, 1933; New York City, U.S.
- Died: June 25, 2025 (aged 92); Bartlett, Illinois, U.S.
- Education: Columbia University
- Known for: Third director of Fermilab
- Scientific career
- Fields: Physics
- Workplaces: Columbia University; Cornell University; Fermilab
- Doctoral advisor: Allan Maxwell Sachs

John Peoples Jr. (January 22, 1933 – June 25, 2025) was an American physicist who served as Fermilab's third director, served as director of the Sloan Digital Sky Survey, and oversaw the shutdown of the Superconducting Super Collider.

== Early life and education ==
John Peoples Jr. was born in New York City on January 22, 1933. After graduating from Staten Island Academy in 1950, he received a BSEE from the Carnegie Institute of Technology in 1955. He worked as an engineer at Martin-Marietta Corporation until 1959, when he entered Columbia University.

== Research and teaching ==
Peoples received his PhD in physics in 1966 and remained at Columbia as assistant professor of physics until 1969, when he began teaching at Cornell University.

== Career at Fermilab ==
Peoples joined Fermilab as a physicist in 1971, eventually becoming head of the Proton Area and head of the Research Division in 1975. In 1981, Peoples became project manager of Tevatron I, which transformed the Tevatron from a fixed target accelerator to a proton-antiproton collider, and oversaw the construction of the Antiproton Source. Peoples left Fermilab briefly from 1987 to 1988 to assist the Central Design Group for the Superconducting Super Collider at Lawrence Berkeley Laboratory. When he returned to Fermilab in the fall of 1988, he became deputy director of the lab. After Leon M. Lederman stepped down from the Fermilab directorship, Peoples became director on July 1, 1989.

During Peoples's time as Fermilab's director, the lab increased the Tevatron's luminosity by a factor of 20 between 1990 and 1994, which made it possible for Fermilab's experiments CDF and D0 to discover the top quark. He also oversaw the construction of Fermilab's Main Injector from proposal in 1990 to completion in 1999, expanded the lab's work in experimental astrophysics, and modernized the lab's computing infrastructure to ensure it could handle the increasing demands of high-energy physics data. He stepped down from his position as Fermilab director in June 1999.

== Other positions ==
In addition to his work at Fermilab, Peoples managed the shutdown of Superconducting Super Collider between 1993 and 1994, served as chairman of the International Committee for Future Accelerators, a working group of the International Union of Pure and Applied Physics, from 1993 to 1997, and was director of the Sloan Digital Sky Survey from June 1998 to June 2003. He stepped down from his position as Fermilab director in June 1999 and retired from the lab in 2005. From 2003 to 2010, he served as director of the Dark Energy Survey. The American Physical Society awarded him the Robert R. Wilson Prize for Achievement in the Physics of Particle Accelerators in 2010.

== Death ==
Peoples died on June 25, 2025, in Bartlett, Illinois, at the age of 92.
