= Ian Shipsey =

British theoretical physicist (1959–2024)

Ian Shipsey FRS
- Born: 23 July 1959; London, England
- Died: 7 October 2024 (aged 65); Oxford, England
- Education: Queen Mary University of London (B.Sc); University of Edinburgh (PhD)
- Spouse: Daniela Bortoletto
- Children: 1
- Scientific career
- Fields: Particle physics
- Workplaces: University of Oxford; Purdue University; Syracuse University; Cornell University
- Thesis: Measurement of the two gamma decays of neutral K-mesons (1986)
- Doctoral advisor: Ken J. Peach

Ian P. J. Shipsey FRS (23 July 1959 – 7 October 2024) was a British experimental particle physicist who led many significant scientific collaborations associated with the CLEO, ATLAS, and CMS experiments, as well as being the head of the physics department at the University of Oxford between 2018 and 2024. He also helped discover the Higgs boson at CERN by development of a pixel detector that was used to detect it.

== Early life ==
Ian Shipsey was born on in Walthamstow, in East London, England on 23 July 1959. He graduated with a Bachelor of Science from Queen Mary University of London in 1982. He went on to do a PhD in particle physics at the University of Edinburgh under the supervision of Ken J. Peach and Donald Cundy, graduating in 1986. His thesis focused on measuring the decay width of neutral K-mesons into two photons using data from the NA31 experiment carried out at the Super Proton Synchrotron at CERN.

== Career ==
After graduating from the University of Edinburgh, Shipsey went to Syracuse University for three years postodctoral research position. After this he was appointed assistant professor at Purdue University, later elevated to the Julian Schwinger distinguished professorship in 2007. He moved to the University of Oxford in 2013 as Henry Moseley Centenary Professor and became the head of the physics department in 2018. He was a fellow at St Catherine's College.

During his time in the United States, he played a leading role in the CLEO experiment at Cornell University, being elected co-spokesperson three times. He constructed the muon detector and led studies into charmed baryon and bottom quark decay searches. Shipsey was one of the key proponents for and CLEO-c experiment, results from which were used to make the most precise tests for lattice QCD heavy quark calculations.

From 2001 onwards he was working on the CMS experiment, constructing silicon cameras for the detector, using which he made the first cross section measurements of the Upsilon meson. With his students he also measured Upsilon meson suppression in Large Hadron Collider heavy-ion collisions provided experimental evidence for quark-gluon plasma. Shipsey also formed one of two teams that were the first to observe strange B meson di-muon decays.

After arriving in Oxford, Shipsey became the Oxford ATLAS group leader where he oversaw the university's new silicon detector fabrication facility whose detector will be used for the high-luminosity LHC ATLAS upgrade. With his students he also managed to measure the Higgs mass and the Higgs decay width. In 2008 he became the principal investigator for the Vera C. Rubin Observatory at the Science and Technology Facilities Council, providing critical components for the observatory. He also worked on developing cameras for MAGIS in the United States and AION in the United Kingdom.

He was elected as a Fellow of the Royal Society (FRS) in 2022 along with an honorary fellowship at the Institute of Physics in 2023. Additionally he also won the James Chadwick Medal and Prize in 2019.

== Personal life and death ==
Shipsey met Daniela Bortoletto at CERN during his PhD, with them getting married in 1988. They had one daughter together. In 1989, Shipsey contracted a sudden and near-fatal illness while at Cornell that left him totally deaf. Twelve years later he acquired a cochlear ear implant that reinstated some of his hearing, following which he became a major advocate of the technology, giving over 100 public talks on it.

Shipsey died on 7 October 2024, at the age of 65.
