= Daniela Bortoletto =

Italian physicist

Daniela Bortoletto OBE
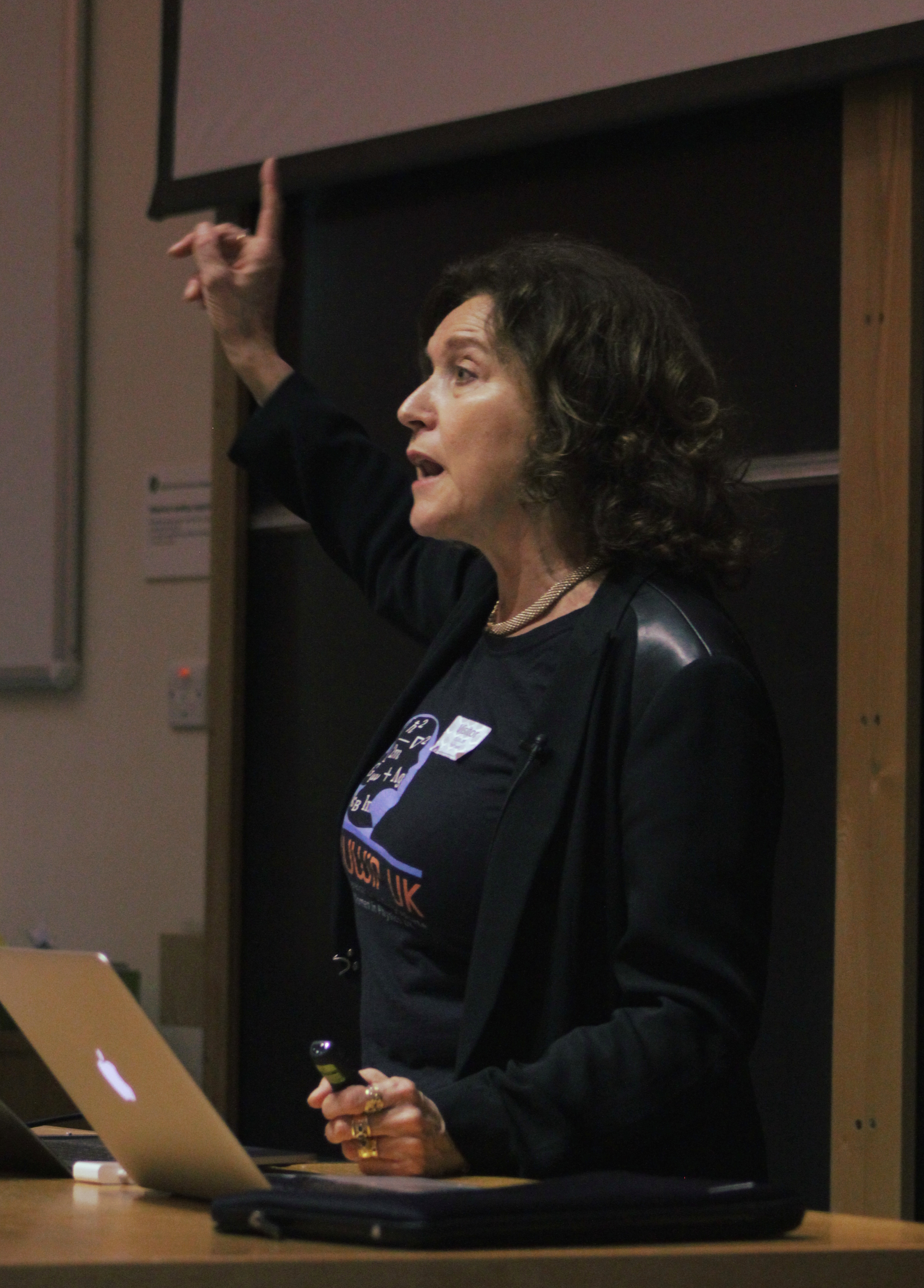
- Daniela Bortoletto speaking at the UK Conference for Undergraduate Women in Physics 2019
- Known for: Co-discovering the Higgs boson and the top quark
- Title: Nicholas Kurti Senior Research Fellow in Physics
- Spouse: Ian Shipsey

Academic background
- Education: University of Pavia
- Alma mater: Syracuse University
- Doctoral advisor: Sheldon Stone

Academic work
- Discipline: Physics
- Sub-discipline: Particle physics
- Institutions: University of Oxford, Purdue University, CERN
- Main interests: Silicon detector development

Daniela Bortoletto OBE is an Italian-British high energy physicist, head of Particle Physics at the University of Oxford and Nicholas Kurti Senior Research Fellow in Physics at Brasenose College, University of Oxford. She works in silicon detector development and was a co-discoverer of both the Higgs boson and the top quark.

== Early life and education ==
Bortoletto grew up in the Italian Alps and studied at the University of Pavia, graduating summa cum laude with a bachelor's degree in physics. She was a member of Collegio Ghislieri in Pavia. She earned her PhD in 1989 at Syracuse University, under the supervision of Sheldon Stone.

== Research ==
Bortoletto moved to Purdue University to pursue a postdoctoral fellowship. In 1994, she received a NSF Career Advancement Award and became the Alfred P. Sloan Research Fellow. While part of the CDF collaboration in 1995, she co-discovered the top quark. Two years later, she won a NSF Faculty Early Career Development Award. In 2004, she gained fellowship of the American Physical Society.

In 2010, Bortoletto became the E. M. Purcell Distinguished Professor of Physics at Purdue University. For seven years, she was the upgrade coordinator for the US CMS collaboration, part of the CMS experiment at the Large Hadron Collider at CERN. In 2013, she moved to the University of Oxford, and transferred from the CMS collaboration to the ATLAS collaboration, again working on the LHC. Her research focuses on silicon detector development. Bortoletto became a fellow of the Institute of Physics in 2015. She is an editor for the journal Nuclear Instruments and Methods in Physics Research Section A.

In 2015, Bortoletto set up the UK arm of the Conference for Undergraduate Women in Physics. The first five conferences were run by Bortoletto at Oxford from 2015 to 2019; the conference is annually held across the UK and Ireland.

Bortoletto was appointed Officer of the Order of the British Empire (OBE) in the 2024 New Year Honours for services to particle physics and gender equality.
