= Marina Artuso =

Particle physicist at Syracuse University

- Born: July 12, 1953; Mestre, Italy
- Education: Polytechnic University of Milan; Northwestern University
- Spouse: Sheldon Stone
- Awards: APS Fellow (2008); AAAS Fellow (2024)
- Scientific career
- Fields: Experimental particle physics High energy physics
- Workplaces: Syracuse University; CERN; Cornell University; Columbia University
- Website: artsandsciences.syracuse.edu/people/faculty/artuso-marina/

Marina Artuso is an experimental physicist and a Distinguished Professor of physics at Syracuse University. Her experimental particle physics research focuses on development of innovative instrumentation for use in studies of the B mesons.

Artuso joined Syracuse in 1991, and has worked on the ongoing, LHCb experiment at the CERN laboratory in Geneva, Switzerland since 2005. She is Syracuse team leader at LHCb, directing the high-energy physics group, since 2021.

Artuso was elected fellow of the American Association for the Advancement of Science in 2024.
