= CUSB =

CUSB (Columbia University-Stony Brook) was a particle detector at the Cornell Electron Storage Ring. CUSB, along with CLEO, discovered both the Υ(3S) and Υ(4S) meson resonances. They also produced studies of the photon transitions between the Upsilon states and B meson decays.
