= Alexander Skrinsky =

Russian physicist

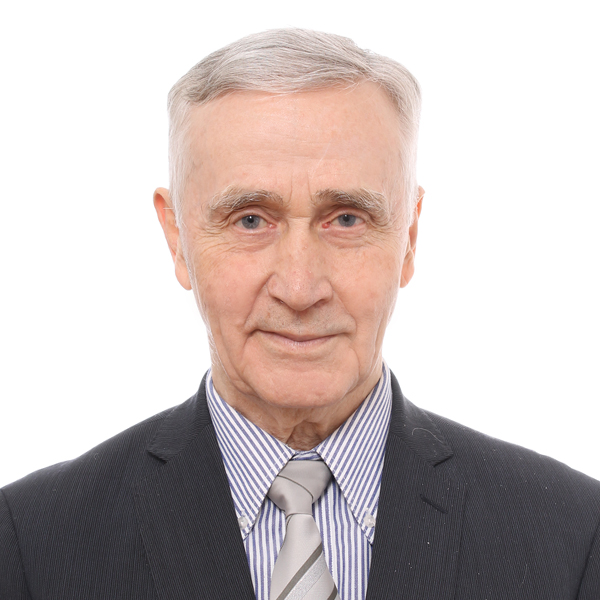
- Born: Alexander Nikolayevich Skrinsky; 15 January 1936 (age 90); Orenburg, Soviet Union
- Education: M. V. Lomonosov Moscow State University
- Awards: Demidov Prize; Lenin Prize; USSR State Prize
- Scientific career
- Fields: Nuclear physics
- Patrons: Gersh Budker

Alexander Nikolayevich Skrinsky (Russian: Александр Николаевич Скринский; born 15 January 1936) is a Soviet and Russian nuclear physicist.

== Biography ==
He was born in Orenburg and was educated at the high school in the city of Gorky and then at the Lomonosov Moscow State University.

In 1957 he joined the laboratory of Gersh Budker, which was a part of the I. V. Kurchatov Institute of Atomic Energy (now the Kurchatov Institute). Since 1962, Skrinsky has been connected with the Budker Institute of Nuclear Physics, where he was director from 1977 to 2015.

Skrinsky made a significant contribution to the development of the physics of accelerators and high-energy physics (in particular, he developed a method of colliding beams, he participated in the creation of new types of colliders in electron-electron, electron-positron and proton-antiproton beams).

In 1964, together with Budker, he developed the foundations of the method of colliding beams, on the basis of which the world's first VEP-1 collider was created at the Institute of Nuclear Physics of the Siberian Branch of the Academy of Sciences of the USSR for experiments in the physics of elementary particles and a series of studies on quantum electrodynamics was carried out. In 1966 an electron-positron collider VEPP-2 was constructed, experiments on which yielded valuable results on the physics of vector mesons and other hadrons. Later, the method of colliding beams became the basis of modern high-energy experimental physics; In particular, based on the technology of the colliding beams method, the Large Hadron Collider was built.

On November 26, 1968 he was elected a corresponding member, and on December 24, 1970 a full member, of the Academy of Sciences of the USSR (since 1991 the Russian Academy of Sciences) in the Division of Nuclear Physics (High Energy Physics). He is also a full member of the American Physical Society (1999) and a foreign member of the Royal Swedish Academy of Sciences (2000).

Skrinsky was a member of CERN's (European Organization for Nuclear Research) Scientific Policy Council from 1986 to 1992. He was chair of the International Committee for Future Accelerators, a working group of the International Union of Pure and Applied Physics, from 1990 to 1992.

== Awards and honors ==
- Lenin Prize (1967) – for participation in the development of the method of colliding beams
- Order of the Red Banner of Labour (1975)
- Order of the October Revolution (1982)
- USSR State Prize (1989)
- Order "For Merit to the Fatherland", 4th class (1996)
- Demidov Prize (1997)
- Order "For Merit to the Fatherland", 3rd class (2000)
- Robert R. Wilson Prize (2001)
- Two State Prizes of the Russian Federation (2002, 2006)
- Order "For Merit to the Fatherland", 2nd class (2007)
- Order of Honour (2018)
- Order "For Merit to the Fatherland", 1st class (2024)
