= Claudio Pellegrini =

Italian/American physicist

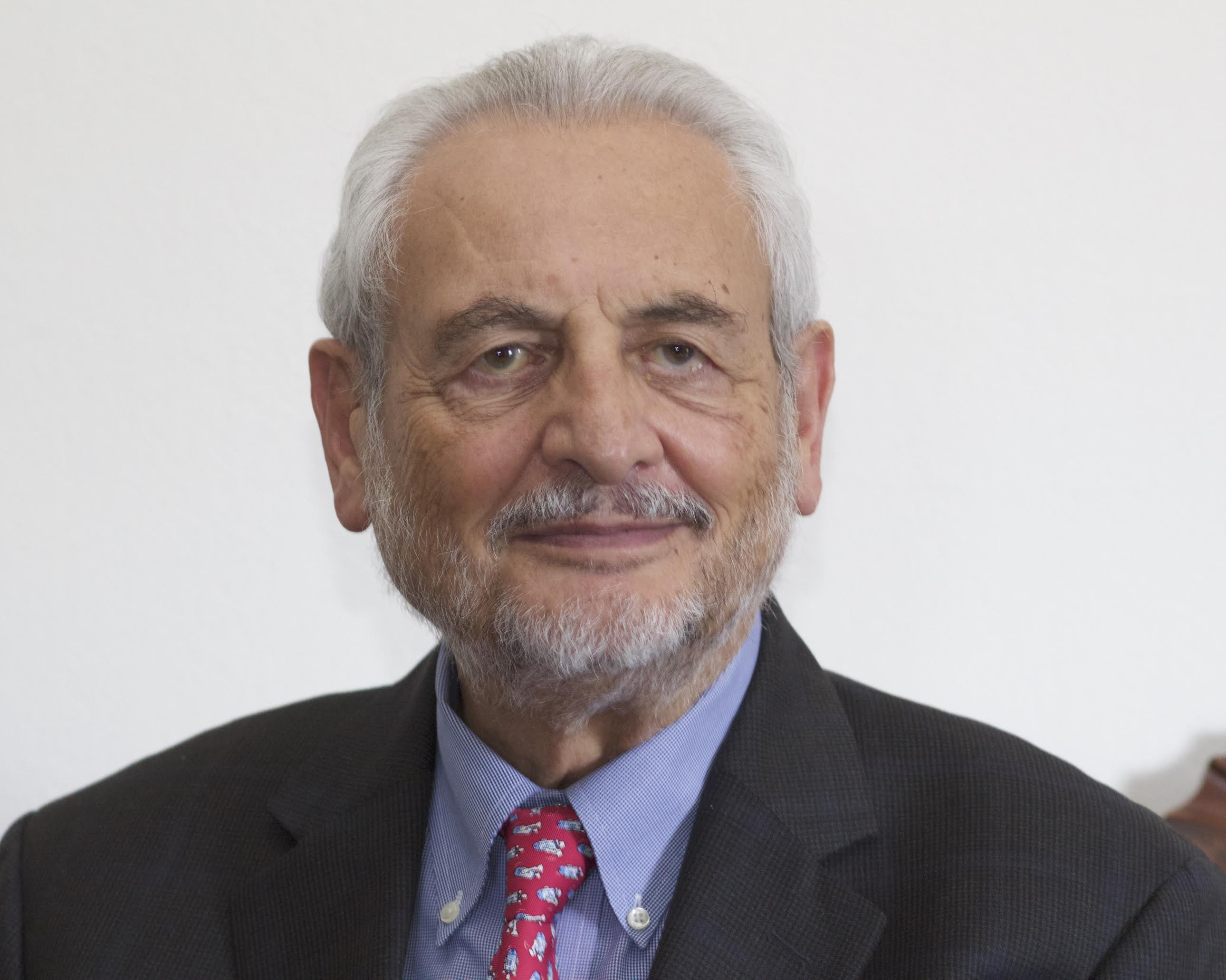
- Photo of Pellegrini in 2015
- Born: May 9, 1935 (age 91); Rome, Italy
- Education: Sapienza University of Rome
- Known for: X-ray free electron laser Head-tail instability
- Awards: 2001 Robert R. Wilson Prize; 2014 Enrico Fermi Award
- Scientific career
- Fields: Accelerator physics
- Workplaces: University of California at Los Angeles

Claudio Pellegrini (born May 9, 1935) is an Italian/American physics and emeritus professor at University of California, Los Angeles (UCLA), known for his pioneering work on X-ray free electron lasers and collective effects in relativistic particle beams.

== Career ==
He was educated at the Sapienza University of Rome where he received the Laurea in Fisica summa cum laude in 1958 and the Libera Docenza, in 1965.

From 1958 to 1978, he worked at the Laboratori Nazionali di Frascati for high energy and nuclear physics. In the early 1960s, he was at the Nordic Institute for Theoretical Physics (NORDITA) in Copenhagen, working on an alternative formulation of the theory of general relativity using tetrad fields to obtain, among other things, a better description of the energy-momentum complex. (See Teleparallelism for a summary of the theoretical context of this work.) In 1978, he moved to the United States and began work at Brookhaven National Laboratory, where he was an Associate Chairman of the National Synchrotron Light Source and co-director at the Center for Accelerator Physics. In 1989, he accepted an appointment at the University of California at Los Angeles (UCLA) as a professor of physics, and later became a distinguished professor.

At the Laboratori Nazionali di Frascati, he worked on the development of electron-positron colliders. He studied the physics of particle beams in accelerators, specifically instabilities and collective effects in high intensity particle beams resulting from the interaction of the particles with a self-generated electromagnetic field. In 1968 he discovered a novel collective effect, the head-tail instability, which limits the luminosity of a collider. The theory suggested a way to control the instability that has been applied to all colliders and storage rings, increasing the collider luminosity and extending their reach to explore elementary particle physics.

At Brookhaven, he studied free electron lasers (FELs) and their application to the generation of high intensity coherent X-ray pulses. In 1992, based on these studies, he proposed building an X-ray FEL at SLAC National Accelerator Laboratory based on self-amplified spontaneous emission (SASE) in order to create femtosecond long, one angstrom, coherent, X-ray pulses. From 1998 to 2001, Pellegrini and his collaborators demonstrated experimentally the validity of the SASE theory. This work and the 1992 proposal led to the construction of the Linac Coherent Light Source (LCLS), the first 1-angstrom X-ray laser, which has been successfully operating at SLAC since 2009. LCLS has opened a new window for the exploration of atomic and molecular science at the one angstrom-one femtosecond length and time scale characteristic of these phenomena.

== Honors and awards ==
He was elected a Fellow of the American Physical Society in 1987. In 2017 he has been elected to membership in the National Academy of Sciences.

In 1999, he received the International Free-Electron Laser (FEL) Prize for his work on X-ray free-electron lasers. In 2001, he received the Robert R. Wilson Prize of the American Physical Society. In 2014, he was awarded the Enrico Fermi Award by U.S. President Barack Obama with the citation “For pioneering research advancing understanding of relativistic electron beams and free-electron lasers, and for transformative discoveries profoundly impacting the successful development of the first hard x-ray free-electron laser, heralding a new era for science.”
