= John Reginald Richardson =

Canadian-American physicist (1912–1997)

J. R. Richardson
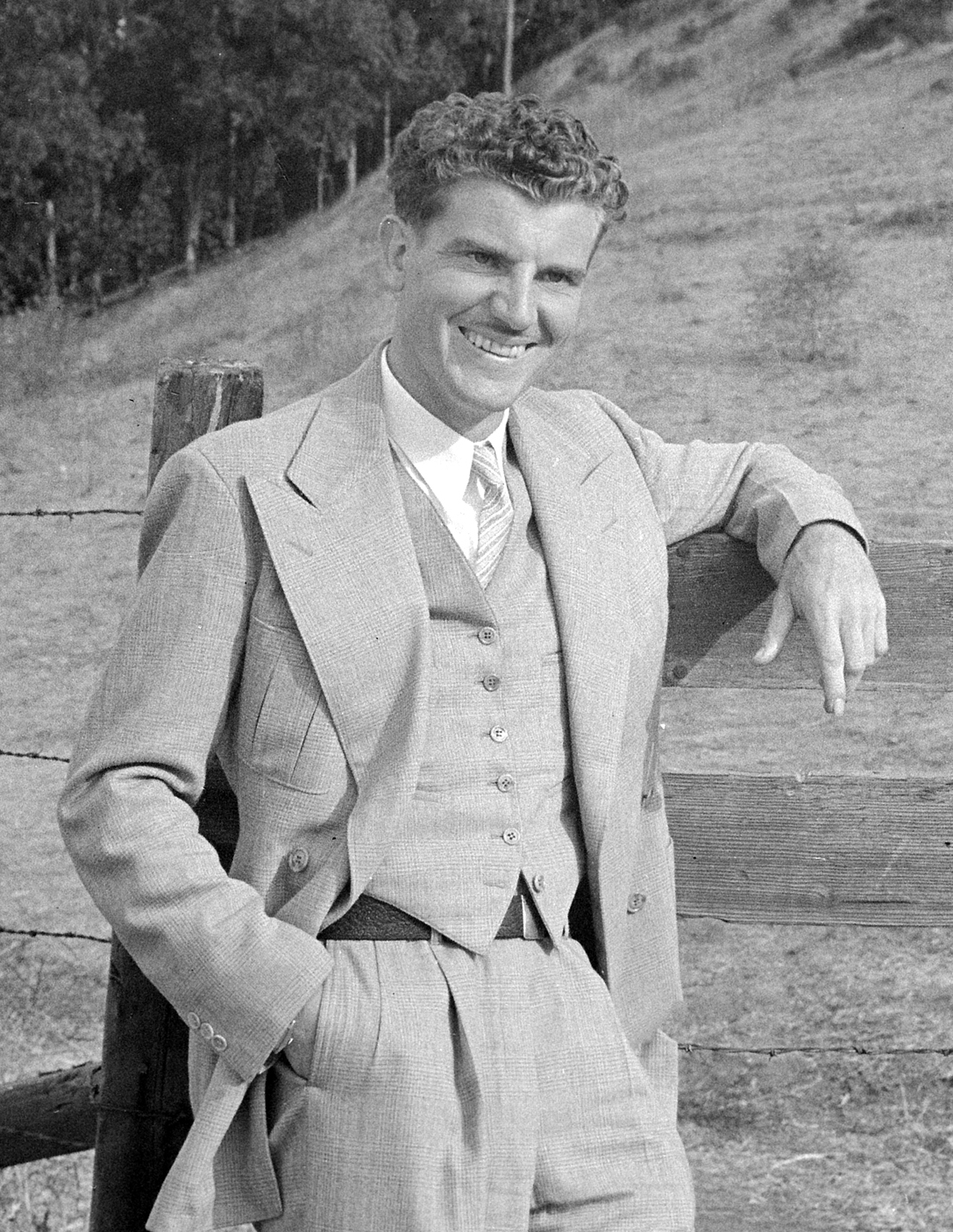
- Richardson in 1940
- Born: John Reginald Richardson; 1912; Edmonton, Alberta, Canada
- Died: November 25, 1997 (aged 84–85); Fremont, California, U.S.
- Education: University of California, Los Angeles; University of California, Berkeley (PhD)
- Awards: Robert R. Wilson Prize (1991)
- Scientific career
- Workplaces: University of Illinois

John Reginald Richardson (October 31 1912 in Edmonton, Alberta, Canada – 25 November 1997 in Fremont, California) was a Canadian-American physicist and one of the dominant figures in cyclotron development. His many achievements include participation in the first demonstration of phase stability, the development of the first synchrocyclotron and the first sector-focused cyclotron.

Richardson grew up in Vancouver until his family emigrated to the US in 1922. He studied physics at UCLA and was a doctoral student in nuclear physics of Ernest Orlando Lawrence at the University of California, Berkeley, receiving his PhD in 1937. After a year at the University of Michigan, he became assistant professor at the University of Illinois. From 1942, he worked on electromagnetic isotope separation for the Manhattan Project in Berkeley and Oak Ridge (calutron). In 1946, after the discovery of the phase stability and the synchrotron principle by Weksler and Edwin McMillan, he collaborated with a group of physicists consisting of Ed Lofgren, Ken MacKenzie, Bernard Peters, Fred Schmidt and Byron Wright in converting the fixed-frequency 37-inch cyclotron at Berkeley to the first synchrocyclotron. This success not only provided the first demonstration of the phase-stability principle but also confirmed the feasibility of converting the large Berkeley 184-inch cyclotron from a classical cyclotron to a synchrocyclotron.

An even bigger sector cyclotron with energies up to 520 MeV was built by Richardson's line at TRIUMF in Vancouver. From 1971 to 1976, Richardson was the director of the laboratory, where he oversaw the construction of the cyclotron.

In 1991 he received the Robert R. Wilson Prize.
