= Rutherford cable =

Type of superconducting electrical cable

A Rutherford cable is a way of forming a superconducting electrical cable, often used to generate magnetic fields in particle accelerators. The superconducting strands are arranged as a many-stranded helix that has been flattened into a rectangular cable. It can typically only be applied to flexible superconductors that can be drawn into wire such as the niobium-based superconductors used in the Large Hadron Collider. The cable is named after the Rutherford Laboratory at Harwell Campus where the cable design was developed.
