= Maury Tigner =

American physicist (born 1937)

Maury Tigner (born 22 April 1937) is an American physicist working on particle accelerators and experimental particle physics.

Tigner studied physics at the Rensselaer Polytechnic Institute until 1958 and received a PhD degree from Cornell University in 1964. He stayed there and became a professor of physics from 1977 to 1994. After a stay at DESY, he led the development and construction of the Cornell Electron Storage Ring, which started operation in 1979. From 1994 to 2000 Tigner worked at the Institute of High Energy Physics of the Chinese Academy of Sciences in Beijing, contributing to the development of BEPC II. In 2000, he moved back to Cornell, leading the laboratory of elementary particle physics until 2006.

Tigner played a major role in the development of the Superconducting Super Collider, leading the Central Design Group at the Lawrence Berkeley National Laboratory formed in 1984, and worked on development of the International Linear Collider.

Tigner became a member of the American Academy of Arts and Sciences in 1991 and a member of the National Academy of Sciences in 1993. He received the Robert R. Wilson Prize in 2000 and the Leo Szilard Lectureship Award of the American Physical Society in 2005.

== Literature ==
- Andrew Sessler, Edmund Wilson: Engines of discovery – a century of particle accelerators, World Scientific 2007, S. 89.
- Tigner, Alexander Chao (publisher): Handbook of Accelerator Physics and Engineering, World Scientific 1999.
