= Cornell Laboratory for Accelerator-based Sciences and Education =

Research institute at Cornell University in Ithaca, NY

Coordinates: 42°26′41.92″N 76°28′22.93″W

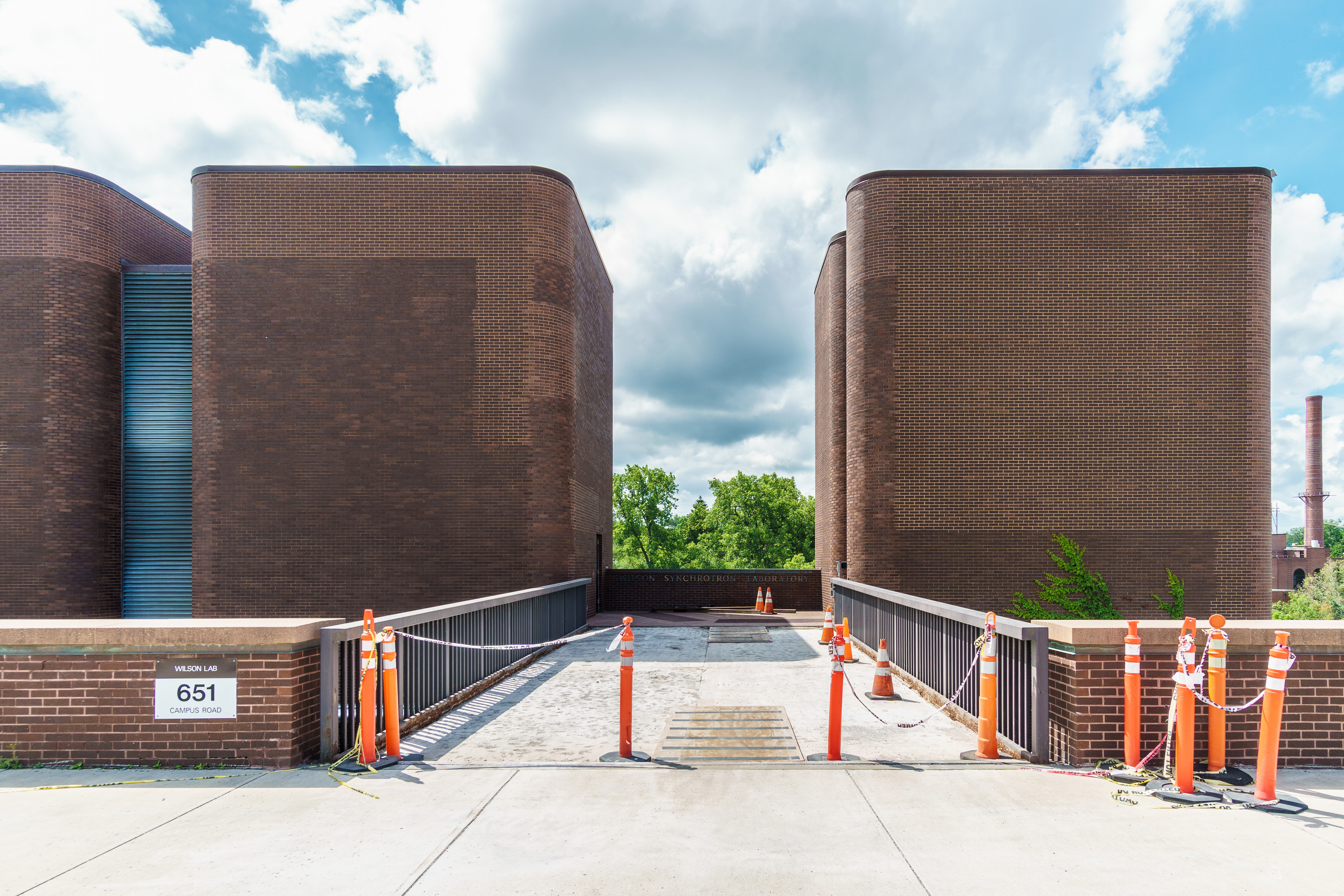
Wilson Laboratory, Campus Road entrance

The Cornell Laboratory for Accelerator-based ScienceS and Education (CLASSE) is a particle accelerator facility located in Wilson Laboratory on the Cornell University campus in Ithaca, New York. CLASSE was formed by merging the Cornell High-Energy Synchrotron Source (CHESS) and the Laboratory for Elementary-Particle Physics (LEPP) in July 2006. Nigel Lockyer is the Director of CLASSE in spring of 2023.

The Wilson Synchrotron Lab, which houses both the Cornell Electron Storage Ring (CESR) and CHESS, is named after Robert R. Wilson, known for his work as a group leader in the Manhattan Project, for being the first director of the Fermi National Accelerator Laboratory, and for contributing to the design of CESR.

== LEPP ==
The Laboratory for Elementary-Particle Physics (LEPP) is a high-energy physics laboratory studying fundamental particles and their interactions.

The 768-meter Cornell Electron Storage Ring (CESR) is in operation below the campus athletic fields. CESR is an electron-positron collider operating at a center-of-mass energy in the range of 3.5–12 GeV. Completed in 1979, CESR stores beams accelerated by the Cornell Synchrotron.

Adding to a long history of significant developments, such as superconducting radio frequency cavities and pretzel orbits, the accelerator group is now developing an entirely new type of superconducting linear accelerator called the Energy Recovery Linear accelerator (ERL). The group is also involved in the design of damping rings, tracking simulations, RF cavities, and accelerator operation for the International Linear Collider (ILC).

Cornell University has the largest graduate program in accelerator physics in the US.

== CHESS ==
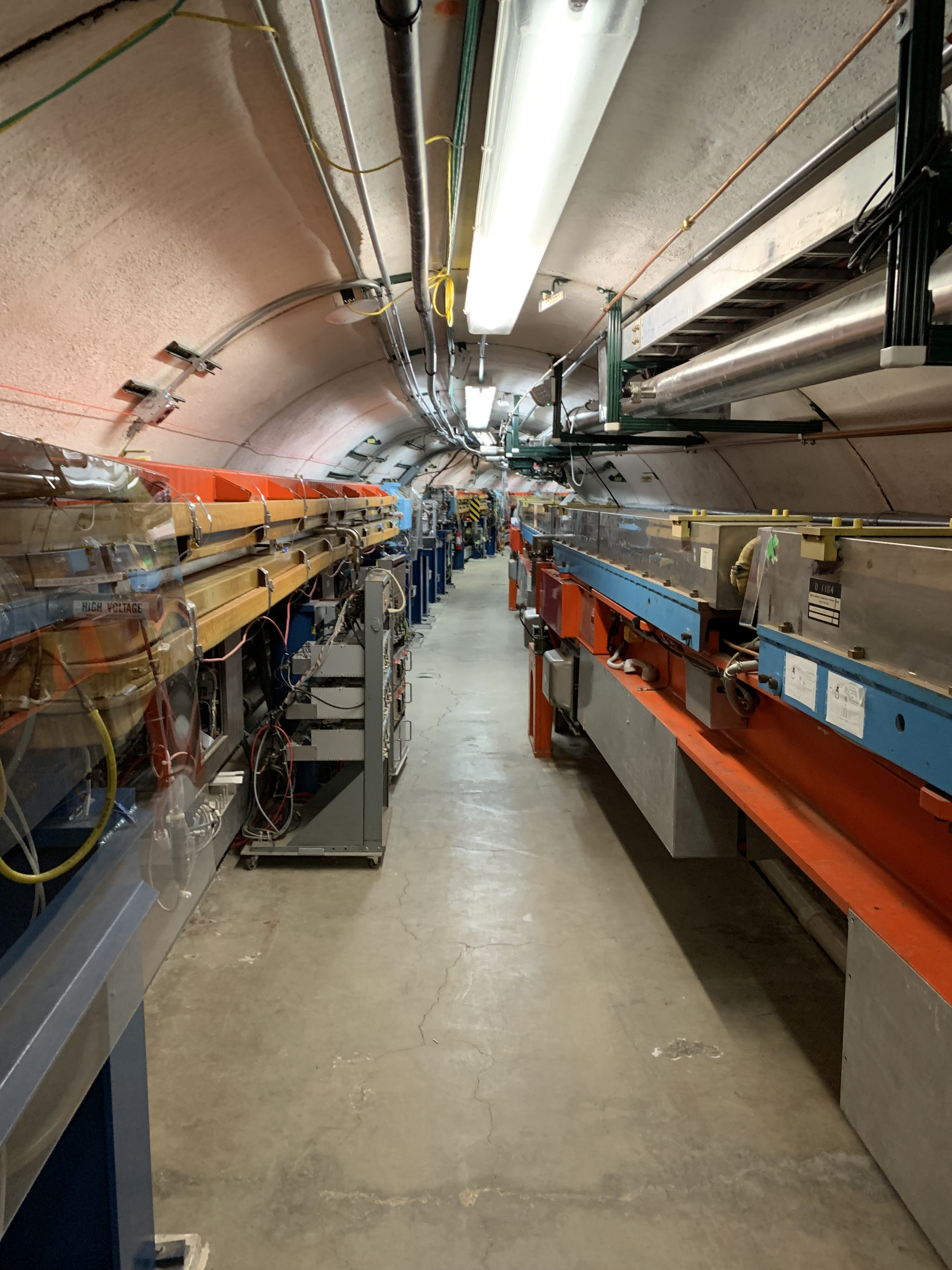
Inside the Cornell Electron Storage Ring (CESR) Tunnel

The Cornell High-Energy Synchrotron Source (CHESS) is a high-intensity, high-energy X-ray light source. The lab provides synchrotron radiation facilities for multidisciplinary scientific research, with a particular focus on protein crystallographic studies under the auspices of the National Institutes of Health (NIH).

CHESS was built between 1978 and 1980 as a synchrotron x-ray facility tied to the Cornell Electron Storage Ring (CESR) High-Energy Physics program (sometimes referred to, and better known as, particle physics), which produces an electron energy of 5.5 GeV.

The original laboratory, CHESS West, included three instrumented beamlines [with] six independent experimental stations. The CHESS East laboratory was constructed during 1988–1989, adding two beam lines and four instrumented experimental stations. CHESS East contains a biohazard level BL3 facility (built with funds from the NIH). Construction began in 1999 for an addition to the facility called the "G-line" to provide a new beam line and three additional experimental stations. This station, commissioned in 2002, was "constructed with extensive toxic gas handling capabilities advancing the prospects for in-situ crystal growth experiments."

Work performed at CHESS and at the National Synchrotron Light Source (NSLS) at Brookhaven National Laboratory led to the 2003 Nobel Prize in Chemistry, awarded to Dr. Roderick MacKinnon, M.D "for structural and mechanistic studies of ion channels".
