= CLEO (particle detector) =

Particle detector at Cornell University

The CLEO experiment was a particle detector that operated from 1979 to 2008 at the Cornell Electron Storage Ring (CESR). The experiment was designed to study the exotic and short-lived particles produced when beams of electrons and their antimatter counterparts, positrons, were smashed together at high energies. Functioning like a giant, multi-layered digital camera, the detector recorded the subatomic debris from these collisions. This allowed physicists to study the fundamental building blocks of matter, particularly particles known as mesons and leptons containing bottom quarks, charm quarks, and tau leptons. The name CLEO is not an acronym; it is short for Cleopatra and was chosen to complement the accelerator's name, CESR (pronounced Caesar).

Over its thirty-year lifetime, the CLEO detector and the international collaboration of physicists who ran it made significant contributions to particle physics. The experiment's primary focus was the study of B mesons, particles whose behavior provides key insights into the universe's matter-antimatter imbalance and the weak force. While later, more powerful B-factories like BaBar and Belle eventually surpassed its capabilities in B physics, CLEO remained a highly productive experiment. In its later years, under the name CLEO-c, it shifted focus to high-precision measurements of particles containing charm quarks, providing crucial data for testing theories of the strong force. At the time of its decommissioning, CLEO was one of the longest-running experiments in the history of particle physics.

== History ==
=== Proposal and construction ===
Cornell University had built a series of synchrotrons since the 1940s. The 10 GeV synchrotron in operation during the 1970s had conducted a number of experiments, but it ran at much lower energy than the 20 GeV linear accelerator at SLAC. As late as October 1974, Cornell planned to upgrade the synchrotron to reach energies of 25 GeV and build a new synchrotron to reach 40 GeV. After the discovery of the J/Ψ in November 1974 demonstrated that interesting physics could be done with an electron-positron collider, Cornell submitted a proposal in 1975 for an electron-positron collider operating up to center-of-mass energies of 16 GeV using the existing synchrotron tunnel. An accelerator at 16 GeV would explore the energy region between that of the SPEAR accelerator and the PEP and PETRA accelerators. CESR and CLEO were approved in 1977 and mostly finished by 1979. CLEO was built in the large experimental hall at the south end of CESR; a smaller detector named CUSB (for Columbia University-Stony Brook) was built at the north interaction region. Between the proposal for and construction of CESR and CLEO, Fermilab discovered the Υ resonances and suggested that as many as three states existed. The Υ(1S) and Υ(2S) were confirmed at the DORIS accelerator. The first order of business once CESR was running was to find the Υs. CLEO and CUSB found the Υ(1S) shortly after beginning to collect data, and used the mass difference from DORIS to quickly find the Υ(2S). CESR's higher beam energies allowed CLEO and CUSB to find the more massive Υ(3S) and discover the Υ(4S). Furthermore, the presence of an excess of electrons and muons at the Υ(4S) indicated that it decayed to B mesons. CLEO proceeded to publish over sixty papers using the original CLEO I configuration of the detector.

CLEO had competition in the measurement of B mesons, particularly from the ARGUS collaboration. The CLEO collaboration was worried that the ARGUS detector at DESY would be better than CLEO, therefore it began to plan for an upgrade. The improved detector would use a new drift chamber for tracking and dE/dx measurements, a cesium iodide calorimeter inside a new solenoid magnet, time of flight counters, and new muon detectors. The new drift chamber (DR2) had the same outer radius as the original drift chamber to allow it to be installed before the other components were ready.

CLEO collected data for two years in the CLEO I.V configuration: new drift chamber, ten layer vertex detector (VD) inside the drift chamber, three layer straw tube drift chamber insert (IV) inside the VD, and a prototype CsI calorimeter replacing one of the original pole-tip shower detectors. The highlight of the CLEO I.V era was the observation of semi-leptonic B decays to charmless final states, submitted less than three weeks before a similar observation from ARGUS. The shutdown for the installation of DR2 allowed ARGUS to beat CLEO to the observation of B mixing, which was the most cited measurement of any of the symmetric B experiments.

=== CLEO II ===
CLEO shut down in April 1988 to begin the remainder of the CLEO II installation, and finished the upgrade in August 1989. A six layer straw chamber precision tracker (PT) replaced the IV, and the time-of-flight detectors, CsI calorimeter, solenoid magnet and iron, and muon chambers were all installed. This would be the CLEO II configuration of the detector. During the CLEO II era, the collaboration observed the flavor changing neutral current decays B^{+,0}→ K^{*+,0} γ and b → s γ. Decays of B mesons to two charmless mesons were also discovered during CLEO II. These decays were of interest because of the possibilility to observe CP violation in decays such as K^{±}π^{0}, although such a measurement would require large amounts of data.

Observation of time-dependent asymmetries in the production of certain flavor-symmetric final states (such as J/Ψ K^{0}_{S}) was an easier way to detect CP violation in B mesons, both theoretically and experimentally. An asymmetric accelerator, one in which the electrons and positrons had different energies, was necessary to measure the time difference between B^{0} and B̅^{0} decays. CESR and CLEO submitted a proposal to build a low energy ring in the existing tunnel and upgrade the CLEO II detector with NSF funding. SLAC also submitted a proposal to build a B factory with DOE funds. The initial designs were first reviewed in 1991, but DOE and NSF agreed that insufficient funds were available to build either facility and a decision on which one to build was postponed. The proposals were reconsidered in 1993, this time with both facilities competing for DOE money. In October 1993, it was announced that the B factory would be built at SLAC.

After losing the competition for the B factory, CESR and CLEO proceeded with a two-part plan to upgrade the accelerator and the detector. The first phase was the upgrade to the CLEO II.V configuration between May and October 1995, which included a silicon detector to replace the PT and a change of the gas mixture in the drift chamber from an argon-ethane mix to a helium-propane mix. The silicon detector provided excellent vertex resolution, allowing precise measurements of D^{0}, D^{+}, D_{s} and τ lifetimes and D mixing. The drift chamber had better efficiency and momentum resolution.

=== CLEO III ===
The second phase of the upgrade included new superconducting quadrupoles near the detector. The VD and DR2 detectors would need to be replaced to make room for the quadrupole magnets. A new silicon detector and particle identification chamber would also be included in the CLEO-III configuration.

The CLEO III upgrade replaced the drift chamber and silicon detector and added a ring-imaging Cherenkov (RICH) detector for enhanced particle identification. The CLEO III drift chamber (DR3) achieved the same momentum resolution as the CLEO II.V drift chamber, despite having a shorter lever arm to accommodate the RICH detector. The mass of the CLEO III endplates was also reduced to allow better resolution in the endcap calorimeters.

CLEO II.V had stopped collecting data in February 1999. The RICH detector was installed beginning in June 1999, and DR3 was installed immediately afterwards. The silicon detector was to be installed next, but it was still being built. An engineering run was taken until the silicon detector was ready for installation in February 2000. CLEO III collected 6 fb^{−1} of data at the Υ(4S) and another 2 fb^{−1} below the Υ(4S).

With the advent of the high luminosity BaBar and Belle experiments, CLEO could no longer make competitive measurements of most of the properties of the B mesons. CLEO decided to study the various bottom and charm quarkonia states and charm mesons. The program began by revisiting the Υ states below the B meson threshold and the last data collected with the CLEO-III detector was at the Υ(1-3S) resonances.

=== CLEO-c ===
CLEO-c was the final version of the detector, and it was optimized for taking data at the reduced beam energies needed for studies of the charm quark. It replaced the CLEO III silicon detector, which suffered from lower-than-expected efficiency, with a six layer, all stereo drift chamber (ZD). CLEO-c also operated with the solenoid magnet at a reduced magnetic field of 1 T to improve the detection of low momentum charged particles. The low particle multiplicities at these energies allowed efficient reconstruction of D mesons. CLEO-c measured properties of the D mesons that served as inputs to the measurements made by the B factories. It also measured many of the quarkonia states that helped verify lattice QCD calculations.

== Detector ==
CLEO's subdetectors perform three main tasks: tracking of charged particles, calorimetry of neutral particles and electrons, and identification of charged particle type.

=== Tracking ===
CLEO has always used a solenoid magnet to allow the measurement of charged particles. The original CLEO design called for a superconducting solenoid, but it was clear that one could not be built in time. A conventional 0.42 T solenoid was installed first, then replaced by the superconducting magnet in September 1981. The superconducting coil was designed to operate at 1.2 T, but it was never operated above 1.0 T. A new magnet was built for the CLEO II upgrade and was placed between the calorimeter and the muon detector. It operated at 1.5 T until CLEO-c, when the magnetic field was reduced to 1.0 T.

==== Wire chambers ====
The original CLEO detector used three separate tracking chambers. The innermost chamber (IZ) was a three layer proportional wire chamber that occupied the region between a radius of 9 cm and 17 cm. Each layer had 240 anode wires to measure track azimuth and 144 cathode strip hoops 5 mm wide inside and outside the anode wires (864 cathode strips total) to measure track z.

The CLEO I drift chamber (DR) was immediately outside the IZ and occupied the region between a radius of 17.3 cm and 95 cm. It consisted of seventeen layers of 11.3 mm × 10.0 mm cells with 42.5 mm between the layers, for a total of 5304 cells. There were two layers of field wires for every layer of sense wires. The odd-numbered layers were axial layers, and the even-numbered layers were alternating stereo layers.

The last CLEO I dedicated tracking chamber was the planar outer Z drift chamber (OZ) between the solenoid magnet and the dE/dx chambers. It consisted of three layers separated radially by 2.5 cm. The innermost layer was perpendicular to the beamline, and the outer two layers were at ±10° relative to the innermost chamber to provide some azimuthal tracking information. Each octant was equipped with an OZ chamber.

A new drift chamber, DR2, was built to replace the original drift chamber. The new drift chamber had the same outer radius as the original one so that it could be installed before the rest of the CLEO II upgrades were ready. DR2 was a 51 layer detector, with a 000+000- axial/stereo layer arrangement. DR2 had only one layer of field wires between each layer of sense wires, allowing many more layers to fit in the allotted space. The axial sense wires had a half-cell stagger to help resolve the left-right ambiguity of the original drift chamber. The inner and outer field layers of the chamber were cathode strips to make measurements of the longitudinal coordinate of tracks. DR2 was also designed to make dE/dx measurements in addition to tracking measurements.

The IZ chamber was replaced with a ten-layer drift chamber (VD) in 1984. When the beampipe radius was reduced from 7.5 to 5.0 cm in 1986, a three-layer straw chamber (IV) was built to occupy the newly available space. The IV was replaced during the CLEO II upgrade with a five-layer straw tube with a 3.5 cm inner radius.

The CLEO III drift chamber (DR3) was designed to have similar performance as the CLEO II/II.V drift chamber even though it would be smaller to allow space for the RICH detector. The innermost sixteen layers were axial, and the outermost 31 layers were grouped in alternating stereo four-layer superlayers. The outer wall of the drift chamber was instrumented with 1 cm wide cathode pads to provide additional z measurements.

The last drift chamber built for CLEO was the inner drift chamber ZD for the CLEO-c upgrade. Its six layer, all stereo layer design would provide longitudinal measurements of low-momentum tracks that would not reach stereo layers of the main drift chamber. With the exception of the larger stereo angle and smaller cell size, the ZD design was very similar to the DR3 design.

==== Silicon detectors ====
CLEO built its first silicon vertex detector for the CLEO II.V upgrade. The silicon detector was a three-layer device, arranged in octants. The innermost layer was at a radius of 2.4 cm and the outermost layer was at a radius of 4.7 cm. A total of 96 silicon wafers were used, with a total of 26208 readout channels.

The CLEO III upgrade included a new four layer, double-sided silicon vertex detector. It was made of 447 identical 1 in × 2 in wafers with a 50 micrometre strip pitch on the r-φ side and a 100 micrometre pitch on the z side. The silicon detector achieved 85% efficiency after installation, but soon began to suffer increasingly large inefficiencies. The inefficiencies were found in roughly semi-circular regions on the wafers. The silicon detector was replaced for CLEO-c because of its poor performance, the reduced need for vertexing capabilities, and the desire to minimize the material near the beampipe.

=== Calorimetry ===
CLEO I had three separate calorimeters. All used layers of proportional tubes interleaved with sheets of lead. The octant shower detectors were outside the time-of-flight detectors in each of the octants. Each octant detector had 44 layers of proportional tubes, alternating parallel and perpendicular to the beampipe. Wires were ganged together to reduce the number of readout channels for a total of 774 gangs. The octant end shower detectors were sixteen layer devices placed at either end of the dE/dx chambers. The layers followed an azimuthal, positive stereo, azimuthal, negative stereo pattern. The stereo wires were parallel to the slanted sides of the detector. The layers were ganged in a similar fashion as the octant shower detectors. The pole tip shower detector was placed between the ends of the drift chamber and the pole tips of the magnet flux return. The pole tip shower detector had 21 layers, with seven groups of vertical, +120°, -120° layers. The shower detector on each side was built in two halves to allow access to the beampipe.

The calorimetry was significantly improved during the CLEO II upgrade. The new electromagnetic calorimeter used 7784 CsI crystals doped with thallium. Each crystal was roughly 30 cm deep and had a 5 cm × 5 cm face. The central region of the calorimeter was a cylinder placed between the drift chamber and the solenoid magnet, and two endcap calorimeters were placed at either end of the drift chamber. The crystals in the endcap were oriented parallel to the beam line. The crystals in the central calorimeter faced a point displaced from the interaction point both longitudinally and transversely by a few centimeters to avoid inefficiencies from particles passing between neighboring crystals. The calorimeter primarily measured the energy of photons or electrons, however it was also used to detect antineutrons. All versions of the detector from CLEO-II through CLEO-c used the CsI calorimeter.

=== Particle identification ===
Five types of long-lived, charged particles are produced at CLEO: electrons, pions, muons, kaons and protons. Proper identification of each of these types significantly improves the capabilities of the detector. Particle identification was done by both dedicated subdetectors and by the calorimeter and drift chamber.

The outer portion of the CLEO detector was divided into independent octants that were primarily dedicated to charged particle identification. No clear consensus was reached on the choice of technology for particle identification, therefore two octants were equipped with dE/dx ionization chambers, two octants were equipped with high pressure gas Cerenkov detectors, and four octants were equipped with low pressure gas Cerenkov detectors. The dE/dx system demonstrated superior particle identification performance and aided in tracking, therefore in September 1981 all eight octants were equipped with dE/dx chambers. The dE/dx chambers measured the ionization of charged particles as they passed through a multiwire proportional chamber (MWPC). Each dE/dx octant was made with 124 separate modules, and each module contained 117 wires. Groups of ten modules were ganged together to minimize the number of readout channels. The first two and last two modules were not instrumented, therefore each octant had twelve cells.

The time-of-flight detector was directly outside the dE/dx chambers. It identified a charged particle by measuring its velocity and comparing it to the momentum measurement from the tracking chambers. Scintillating bars were arranged parallel to the beamline, with six bars for each half of the octant. The six bars in each octant half overlapped to avoid having any uninstrumented regions. The scintillation photons were detected by photomultiplier tubes. Each bar was 2.03 m × 0.312 m× 0.025 m.

The CLEO I muon drift chambers were the outermost detectors. Two layers of muon detectors were outside the magnet iron on either end of CLEO. The barrel region had two additional layers of muon chambers after 15 cm and 30 cm of magnet iron. The muon detectors were between 4 and 10 radiation lengths deep and were sensitive to muons with energies of at least 1-2 GeV. The magnet yoke weighed 580 tons, and each of four movable carts at each corner of the detector weighed 240 tons, for a total of 1540 tons.

CLEO II used time-of-flight detectors between the drift chamber and the calorimeter, one in the barrel region, the other in the endcap region. The barrel region consisted of 64 Bicron bars with light guides leading to photomultiplier tubes outside the magnetic field region. A similar system covered the endcap region. The TOF system had a timing resolution of 150 cm. The central and endcap TOF detectors combined covered 97% of the solid angle.

The CLEO I muon detector was far away enough from the interaction region that in-flight decays of pions and kaons were a significant background. The more compact structure of the CLEO II detector allowed the muon detectors to be moved closer to the interaction point. Three layers of muon detectors were placed behind layers of iron absorbers. The streamer counters were read out from each end to determine the z position.

The CLEO III upgrade included the addition of the RICH subdetector, a dedicated particle identification subdetector. The RICH detector was required to be less than 20 cm in the radial direction, between the drift chamber and the calorimeter, and less than 12% of a radiation length. The RICH detector used the Cerenkov radiation of charged particles to measure their velocity. Combined with the momentum measurement from the tracking detectors, the mass of the particle, and therefore its identity, could be determined. Charged particles produced Cerenkov light as they pass through a LiF window. Fourteen rings of thirty LiF crystals comprised the radiator of the RICH, and the four centermost rings had a sawtooth pattern to prevent total internal reflection of the Cerenkov photons. The photons traveled through a nitrogen expansion volume, which allowed the cone angle to be precisely determined. The photons were detected by 7.5 mm × 8.0 mm cathode pads in a multi-wire chamber containing a methane-triethylamine gas mixture.

== Physics program ==
CLEO has published over 200 articles in Physical Review Letters and more than 180 articles in Physical Review. The reports of inclusive and exclusive b → s γ have both been cited over 500 times. B physics was usually CLEO's top priority, but the collaboration has made measurements across a wide spectrum of particle physics topics.

=== B mesons ===
CLEO's most cited paper reported the first measurement of the flavor-changing neutral current decay b→sγ. The measurement agreed well with the Standard Model and placed significant constraints on numerous beyond the Standard Model proposals, such as charged Higgs and anomalous WWγ couplings. The analogous exclusive decay B^{+,0}→ K^{*+,0} γ was also measured. CLEO and ARGUS reported nearly simultaneous measurements of inclusive charmless semileptonic B meson decays, which directly established a non-zero value of the CKM matrix element |V_{ub}|. Exclusive charmless semileptonic B meson decays were first observed by CLEO six years later in the modes B → πlν, ρlν, and were used to determine |V_{ub}|. CLEO also discovered many of the hadronic analogs: B^{+,0}→ K(892)^{+}π^{−}, φ K^{(*)}, K^{+}π^{0}, K^{0}π^{0}, π^{+}π^{−}, π^{+}ρ^{0}, π^{+}ρ^{−}, π^{+}ω η K^{*}, η′ K and K^{0}π^{+}, K^{+}π^{−}. These charmless hadronic decay modes can probe CP violation and are sensitive to the angles α and γ of the unitarity triangle. Finally, CLEO observed many exclusive charmed decays of B mesons, including several that are sensitive to |V_{cb}|: B→ D^{(*)}K^{*−}, B̅^{0}→ D^{*0}π^{0} B→ Λ^{+}_{c}p̅π^{−}, Λ^{+}_{c}p̅π^{+}π^{−}, B̅^{0}→ D^{*0}π^{+}π^{+}π^{−}π^{−}, B̅^{0}→ D^{*}ρ′^{−}, B^{0}→ D^{*−}pp̅π^{+}, D^{*−}pn̅, B→ J/Ψ φ K, B^{0}→ D^{*+}D^{*−}, and B^{+}→ D̅^{0} K^{+}.

=== Charm hadrons ===
Although CLEO ran mainly near the Υ(4S) to study B mesons, it was also competitive with experiments designed to study charm hadrons. The first measurement of charm hadron properties by CLEO was the observation of the D_{s}. CLEO measured a mass of 1970±7 MeV, considerably lower than previous observations at 2030±60 MeV and 2020±10 MeV. CLEO discovered the D_{sJ}(2573) and the D_{sJ}(2463). CLEO was the first experiment to measure the doubly Cabibbo suppressed decay D^{0}→ K^{+}π^{−}, and CLEO performed Dalitz analyses of D^{0,+} in several decay modes. CLEO studied the D^{*}(2010)^{+}, making the first measurement of its width and the most precise measurement of the D^{*}-D^{0} mass difference. CLEO-c made many of the most accurate measurements of D meson branching ratios in inclusive channels, μ^{+}ν_{μ,} semileptonic decays, and hadronic decays. These branching fractions are important inputs to B meson measurements at BaBar and Belle. CLEO first observed the purely leptonic decay D^{+}_{s}→μ^{+}ν̅, which provided an experimental measure of the decay constant f_{D_{s}}. CLEO-c made the most precise measurements of f_{D^{+}} and f_{D_{s}}. These decay constants are in turn a key input to the interpretation of other measurements, such as B mixing. Other D^{+}_{s} decay modes discovered by CLEO are pn̅, ωπ^{+}, η ρ^{+}, η'ρ^{+}, φρ^{+}, η π^{+}, η'π^{+}, and φ l ν. CLEO discovered many charmed baryons and discovered or improved the measurement of many charmed baryon decay modes. Before BaBar and Belle began discovering new charm baryons in 2005, CLEO had discovered thirteen of the twenty known charm baryons: Ξ^{0}_{c}, Ξ^{0,+}_{c}(2790), Ξ^{0,+}_{c}(2815), Ξ^{'0,+}_{c}, Σ^{0,+,++}_{c}(2520), Ξ^{+}_{c}(2645), Ξ^{0}_{c}(2645), and Λ^{+}_{c}(2593). Charmed baryon decay modes discovered at CLEO are Ω^{0}_{c}→ Ω^{−}e^{+}ν̅_{e}; Λ^{+}_{c}→ pK̅^{0}η, Ληπ^{+}, Σ^{+}η, Σ^{*+}η, ΛK̅^{0}K^{+}, Σ^{+}π^{0}, Σ^{+}ω, Λπ^{+}π^{+}π^{−}π^{0}, Λωπ^{+}; and Ξ^{+}_{c}→Ξ^{0}e^{+} ν̅_{e}.

=== Quarkonium ===
Quarkonium states provide experimental input for lattice QCD and non-relativistic QCD calculations. CLEO studied the Υ system until the end of the CUSB and CUSB-II experiments, then returned to the Υ system with the CLEO III detector. CLEO-c studied the lower mass ψ states. CLEO and CUSB published their first papers back-to-back, reporting observation of the first three Υ states. Earlier claims of the Υ(3S) relied on fits of one peak with three components; CLEO and CUSB's observation of three well separated peaks dispelled any remaining doubt about the existence of the Υ(3S). The Υ(4S) was discovered shortly after by CLEO and CUSB and was interpreted as decaying to B mesons because of its large decay width. An excess of electrons and muons at the Υ(4S) demonstrated the existence of weak decays and confirmed the interpretation of the Υ(4S) decaying to B mesons. CLEO and CUSB later reported the existence of the Υ(5S) and Υ(6S) states.

CLEO I through CLEO II had significant competition in Υ physics, primarily from the CUSB, Crystal Ball and ARGUS experiments. CLEO was able, however, to observe a number of Υ(1S) decays: τ^{+}τ^{−}, J/Ψ X and γ X X̅ with X = π^{+}, π^{0}, 2π^{+}, π^{+}K^{+}, π^{+}p, 2K^{+}, 3π^{+}, 2π^{+}K^{+}, and 2π^{+}p. The radiative decays are sensitive to the production of glueballs.

CLEO collected more data at the Υ(1-3S) resonances at the end of the CLEO III era. CLEO III discovered the Υ(1D) state, the χ_{b1,2}(2P)→ωΥ(1S) transitions, and Υ(3S)→τ^{+}τ^{−} decays among others.

CLEO-c measured many of the properties of the charmonium states. Highlights include confirmation of η_{c}', confirmation of Y(4260), pseudoscalar-vector decays of ψ(2S), ψ(2S)→J/ψ decays, observation of thirteen new hadronic decays of ψ(2S), observation of h_{c}(^{1}P_{1}), and measurement of the mass and branching fractions of η in ψ(2S)→J/ψ decay.

=== Tau leptons ===
CLEO discovered six decay modes of the τ:

- τ → K^{−}π^{0}ν_{τ},
- e^{−}ν_{τ}ν̅_{e}γ,
- π^{−}π^{−}π^{+}η ν_{τ}, π^{−}π^{0}π^{0}η ν_{τ}, f_{1}π ν_{τ,}
- K^{−}η ν_{τ} and K^{−}ων_{τ}.

CLEO measured the lifetime of the τ three times with a precision comparable or better than any other measurements at the time. CLEO also measured the mass of the τ twice. CLEO set limits on the mass of ν_{τ} several times, although the CLEO limit was never the most stringent one. CLEO's measurements of the Michel parameters were the most precise for their time, many by a substantial margin.

=== Other measurements ===
CLEO has studied two-photon physics, where both an electron and positron radiate a photon. The two photons interact to produce either a vector meson or hadron-antihadron pairs. CLEO published measurements of both the vector meson process and the hadron-antihadron process.

CLEO performed an energy scan for center-of-mass energies between 7 GeV and 10 GeV to measure the hadronic cross section ratio. CLEO made the first measurements of the π^{+} and K^{+} electromagnetic form factors above Q^{2} > 4 GeV^{2}.

Finally, CLEO has performed searches for Higgs and beyond SM particles: Higgs bosons, axions, magnetic monopoles, neutralinos, fractionally charged particles, bottom squarks, and familons.

== Collaboration ==
Initial design of a detector for the south interaction region of CESR began in 1975. Physicists from Harvard University, Syracuse University and the University of Rochester had worked at the Cornell synchrotron, and were natural choices as collaborators with Cornell. They were joined by groups from Rutgers University and Vanderbilt University, along with collaborators from LeMoyne College and Ithaca College. Additional institutions were assigned responsibility for detector components as they joined the collaboration. Cornell appointed a physicist to oversee development of the portion of the detector inside the magnet, outside the magnet, and of the magnet itself. The structure of the collaboration was designed to avoid perceived shortcomings at SLAC, where SLAC physicists were felt to dominate operations by virtue of their access to the accelerator and detector and to computing and machine facilities. Collaborators were free to work on the analysis of their choosing, and the approval of results for publication was by collaboration-wide vote. The spokesperson (later spokespeople) were also selected by collaboration-wide vote, including graduate students. The other officers in the collaboration were an analysis coordinator and a run manager, then later also a software coordinator.

The first CLEO paper listed 73 authors from eight institutions. Cornell University, Syracuse University and the University of Rochester have been members of CLEO for its entire history, and forty-two institutions have been members of CLEO at one time. The collaboration was its largest in 1996 at 212 members, before collaborators began to move to the BaBar and Belle experiments. The largest number of authors to appear on a CLEO paper was 226. A paper published near the time CLEO stopped taking data had 123 authors.
