= Superconducting Super Collider =

Unfinished Texas particle accelerator canceled in 1993

Superconducting Super Collider (SSC)
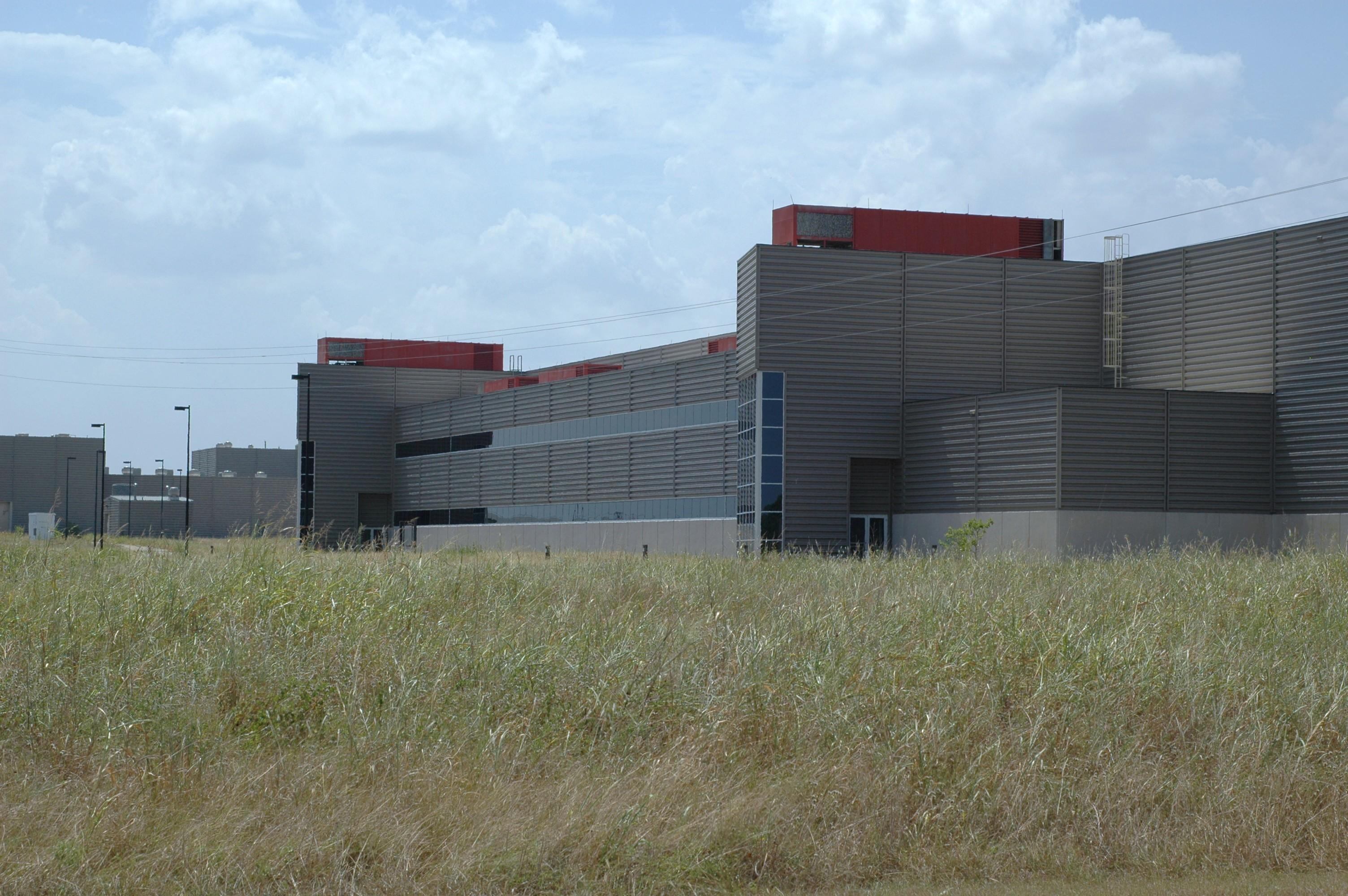
- The abandoned Superconducting Super Collider site in 2008

General properties
- Accelerator type: Synchrotron
- Beam type: proton
- Target type: Collider

Beam properties
- Maximum energy: ~40TeV
- Maximum luminosity: 1×10^{33}/(cm^{2}⋅s)

Physical properties
- Circumference: 87.1 kilometers (54.1 mi)
- Location: Waxahachie, Texas
- Coordinates: 32°21′51″N 96°56′38″W
- Institution: United States Department of Energy
- Dates of operation: Never completed

The Superconducting Super Collider (SSC), nicknamed Desertron, was a particle accelerator complex under construction from 1991 to 1993 near Waxahachie, Texas, United States. Its planned ring circumference was 87.1 kilometers (54.1 mi) with an energy of 20 TeV per proton and was designed to be the world's largest and most energetic particle accelerator. The laboratory director was Roy Schwitters, a physicist at the University of Texas at Austin. Department of Energy administrator Louis Ianniello served as its first project director, followed by Joe Cipriano, who came to the SSC Project from the Pentagon in May 1990. After 22.5 km (14 mi) of tunnel had been bored and about US$2 billion spent, the project was canceled by the US Congress in 1993.

== Proposal and development ==
The supercollider was formally discussed in the 1984 National Reference Designs Study, which examined the technical and economic feasibility of a machine with the design energy of 20 TeV per proton.

Early in 1983, the High-Energy Physics Advisory Panel (HEPAP) formed a subpanel on New Facilities for the US High-Energy Physics Program. Led by Stanford University physicist Stanley Wojcicki, and charged with making recommendations “for a forefront United States High Energy Physics Program in the next five to ten years,” the HEPAP subpanel recommended that the US build the Superconducting Super Collider.

Fermilab director and subsequent Nobel Prize in Physics winner Leon Lederman was a very prominent early supporter – some sources say the architect or proposer – of the Superconducting Super Collider project, as well as a major proponent and advocate throughout its lifetime.

A Central Design Group (CDG) was organized in California at the Lawrence Berkeley Laboratory, which became the gathering place for physicists to come and support the SSC design effort. In the mid-1980s, many leading high-energy physicists, including theorist J. David Jackson of Berkeley, Chris Quigg of Fermilab, Maury Tigner of Cornell, Stanley Wojcicki, as well as Lederman, Chicago’s James Cronin, Harvard theorist Sheldon Glashow, and Roy Schwitters, continued their efforts to promote the Super Collider.

An extensive U.S. Department of Energy review was also done during the mid-1980s. Seventeen shafts were sunk and 23.5 km (14.6 mi) of tunnel were bored by late 1993.

== Partial construction and financial issues ==
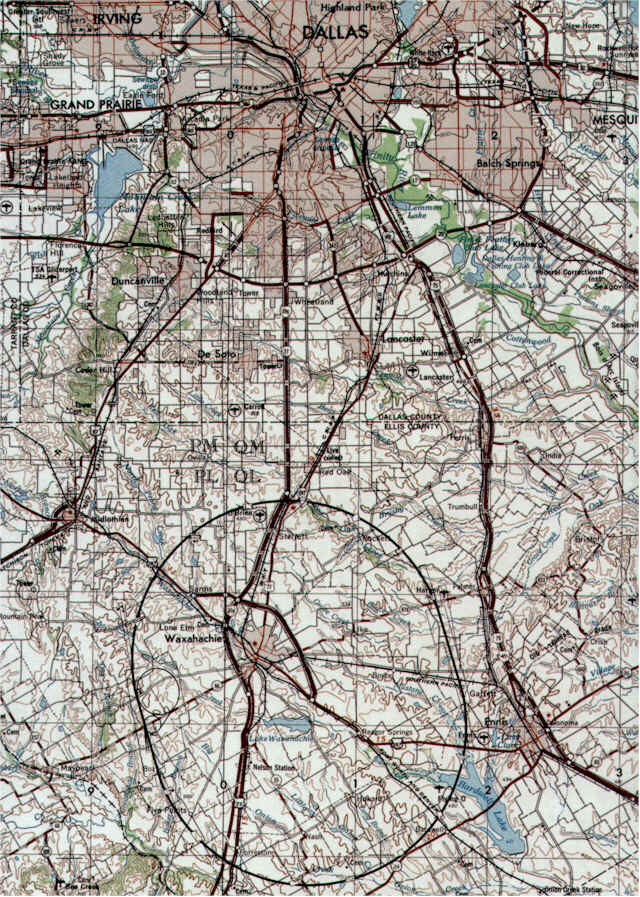
A high-level schematic of the lab landscape during the final planning phases

During the design and the first construction stage, a heated debate ensued about the high cost of the project. In 1987, Congress was told the project could be completed for $4.4 billion, and it gained the enthusiastic support of Speaker Jim Wright of nearby Fort Worth, Texas. A recurring argument was the contrast with NASA's contribution to the International Space Station (ISS), a similar dollar amount. Critics of the project (Congressmen representing other US states and scientists working in non-SSC fields who felt the money would be better spent on their own fields) argued that the US could not afford both of them.

Estimates of the additional cost caused by not using existing physical and human infrastructure at Fermilab in Illinois range from $495 million to $3.28 billion.

Leaders hoped to get financial support from Europe, Canada, Japan, Russia, and India. This was hindered by promotion of the project as promoting American superiority. European funding remained at CERN, which was already working on the Large Hadron Collider. India pledged $50 million, but talks with Japan floundered over trade tensions in the automobile industry. A US-Japanese trade mission where SSC funding was supposed to be discussed ended in the George H. W. Bush vomiting incident.

Construction began in 1991. Congress began appropriating annual funding for the project. In 1992, it was opposed by the majority of the House of Representatives (231–181), but was included in the final reconciled budget due to support in the Senate (62–32). Early in 1993, a group supported by funds from project contractors organized a public relations campaign to lobby Congress directly in support of the project. In February, the General Accounting Office reported a $630 million overrun in the $1.25 billion construction budget. By March, the New York Times reported the estimated total cost had grown to $8.4 billion. In June, the non-profit Project on Government Oversight released a draft audit report by the Department of Energy's Inspector General heavily criticizing the Super Collider for its high costs and poor management by officials in charge of it. The Inspector General investigated $500,000 in questionable expenses over three years, including $12,000 for Christmas parties, $25,000 for catered lunches, and $21,000 for the purchase and maintenance of office plants. The report also concluded that there was inadequate documentation for $203 million in project spending, or 40% of the money spent up to that point.

In 1993, U.S. President Bill Clinton tried to prevent the cancellation by asking Congress to continue "to support this important and challenging effort" through completion because "abandoning the SSC at this point would signal that the United States is compromising its position of leadership in basic science".

== Cancellation ==
After $2 billion had been spent ($400 million by the host state of Texas, the rest by the Department of Energy), the House of Representatives rejected funding on October 19, 1993, and Senate negotiators failed to restore it. Following Rep. Jim Slattery's successful orchestration in the House, President Clinton signed the bill that finally canceled the project on October 30, 1993, stating regret at the "serious loss" for science.

Many factors contributed to the cancellation:

- Rising cost estimates (to $12bn)
- Poor management by physicists and Department of Energy officials
- The end of the need to prove the supremacy of American science with the collapse of the Soviet Union and the end of the Cold War
- Belief that many smaller scientific experiments of equal merit could be funded for the same cost
- Congress's desire to generally reduce spending (the United States had a $255bn budget deficit)
- The reluctance of Texas Governor Ann Richards
- President Bill Clinton's initial lack of support for the project began during the administrations of Richards's predecessor, Bill Clements, and Clinton's predecessors, Ronald Reagan and George H. W. Bush

The project's cancellation was also eased by opposition from within the scientific community. Prominent condensed matter physicists, such as Philip W. Anderson and Nicolaas Bloembergen, testified before Congress opposing the project. They argued that, although the SSC would certainly conduct high-quality research, it was not the only way to acquire new fundamental knowledge, as some of its supporters claimed, and so was unreasonably expensive. Scientific critics of the SSC pointed out that basic research in other areas, such as condensed matter physics and materials science, was underfunded compared to high energy physics, despite the fact that those fields were more likely to produce applications with technological and economic benefits.

=== Reactions to the cancellation ===
Steven Weinberg, a Nobel laureate in Physics, placed the cancellation of the SSC in the context of a bigger national and global socio-economic crisis, including a general crisis in funding for science research and for the provision of adequate education, healthcare, transportation and communication infrastructure, and criminal justice and law enforcement.

Leon Lederman, a leading promoter and advocate of the SSC, wrote a popular science book in the context of the project's last years and loss of congressional support. Published in 1993, The God Particle: If the Universe Is the Answer, What Is the Question? sought to promote awareness of the significance of the scientific work which the SSC would have supported. The book popularized the nickname "the God particle" for the Higgs boson.

The closing of the SSC had adverse consequences for the southern part of the Dallas–Fort Worth Metroplex, contributing to a mild recession especially in those parts of Dallas which lay south of the Trinity River. When the project was canceled, 22.5 km (14.0 mi) of tunnel and 17 shafts to the surface were already dug, and nearly two billion dollars had already been spent on the massive facility.

== Comparison with the Large Hadron Collider ==
The SSC's planned collision energy of 2 x 20 = 40 TeV was roughly three times that of the 2 x 6.8 = 13.6 TeV (as of 2023) of its European counterpart, the Large Hadron Collider (LHC) at CERN in Geneva. However, the planned luminosity was only one tenth of the design luminosity of the LHC.

Although some claimed that the SSC cost was largely due to the massive civil engineering project of digging a huge tunnel, that was somewhat of a distortion. The tunneling and conventional facility buildout budget was only about ten percent of the total budgeted cost (1.1 billion dollars out of a total cost of 10 billion). The major cost item was the magnets, still in laboratory development phase, consequently with a higher level of uncertainty attached to the final cost. The ring circumference of the LHC is 27 km (17 mi), compared to the planned 87.1 kilometers (54.1 mi) of the SSC.

The LHC's advantage in terms of cost was the use of the pre-existing engineering infrastructure and 27 km long cavern of the Large Electron–Positron Collider, and its use of a different, innovative magnet design to bend the higher energy particles into the available tunnel. The LHC eventually cost the equivalent of about 5 billion US dollars to build. The total operating budget of CERN runs to about $1 billion per year. The Large Hadron Collider became operational in August 2008.

In a 2021 interview, Schwitters speculated that, had the project been completed, it would have led to the discovery of the Higgs boson particle 10 years before its eventual discovery in Switzerland and attracted an equivalent number of visitors to North Texas as CERN's 120,000 per year.

== Cross sections of preform superconductor rods from sample runs ==
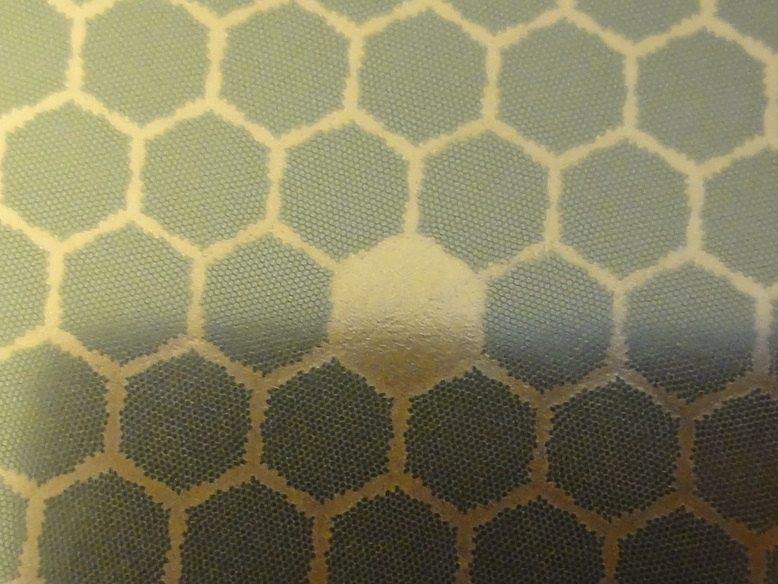

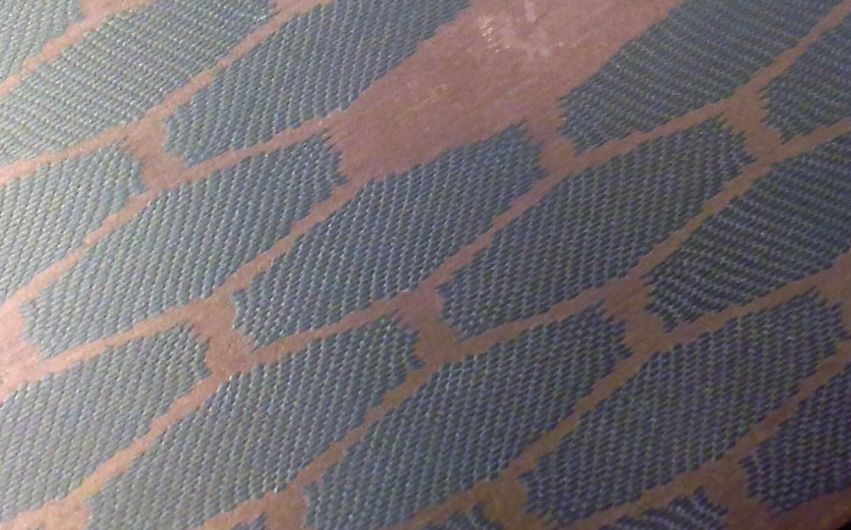

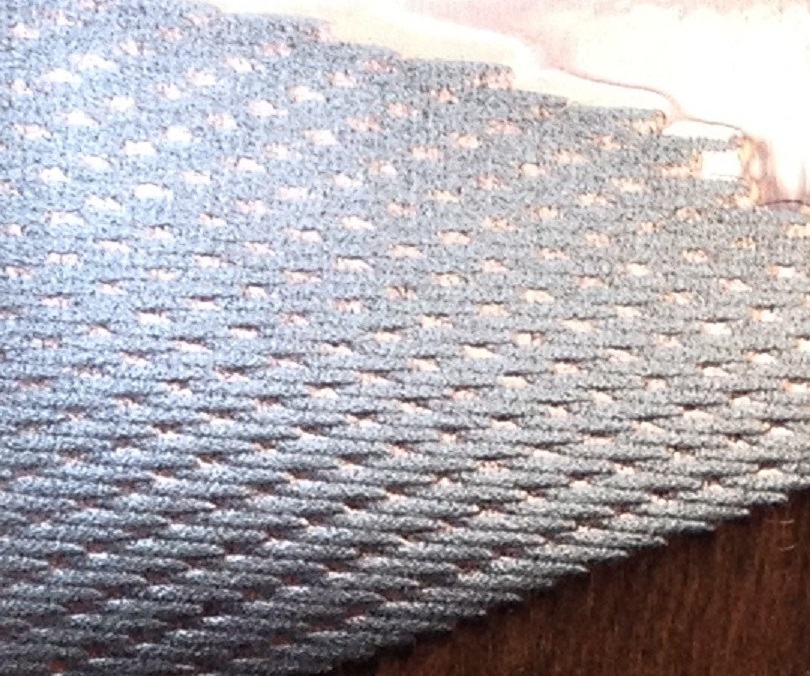

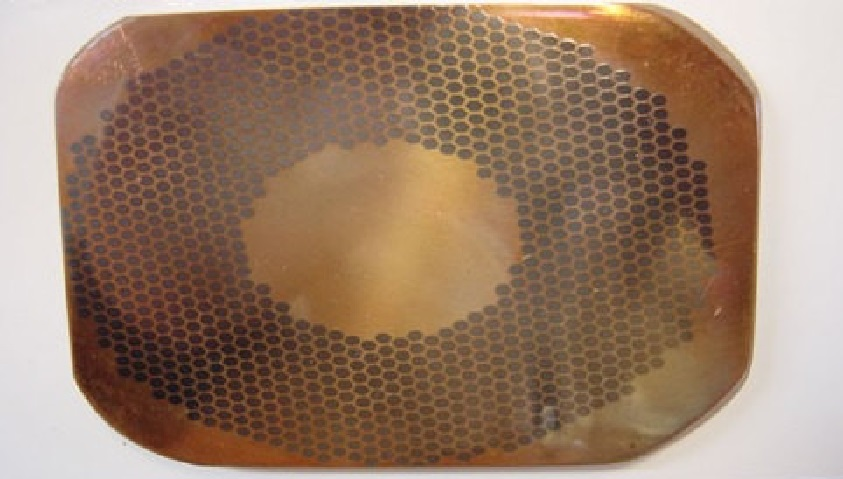

== Fate of the site ==
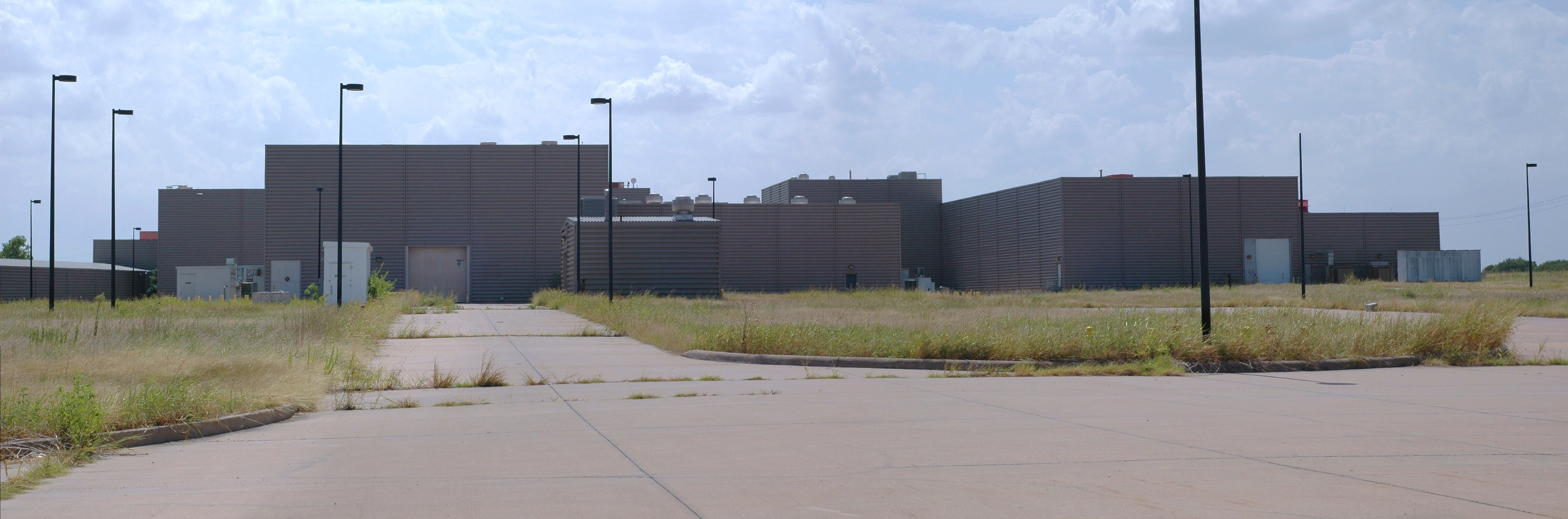
SSC site in 2008

After the project was canceled, the main site was deeded to Ellis County, Texas, and the county tried numerous times to sell the property. The property was sold in August 2006 to an investment group, Collider Data Center, LLC, led by the late J.B. Hunt.

In 2009, Collider Data Center had contracted with GVA Cawley to market the site as a data center. In 2012, chemical company Magnablend bought the property and facilities in the face of some opposition from the local community. The buildings in the facility, which had become prime spots for thieves and parties, were renovated and were re-opened in 2013 by Magnablend. The facility makes a range of oil field products for the energy service industry.

== See also ==
- DESY
- Facility for Rare Isotope Beams – a particle accelerator which uses a superconducting linear accelerator
- Fermilab
- Future Circular Collider study – design project (as of 2017) including the concept of a circular collider with a circumference of 100 km
- Large Hadron Collider
- UNK proton accelerator – a similar competing Soviet project discontinued at about the same time in Russia
