= Cornell Electron Storage Ring =

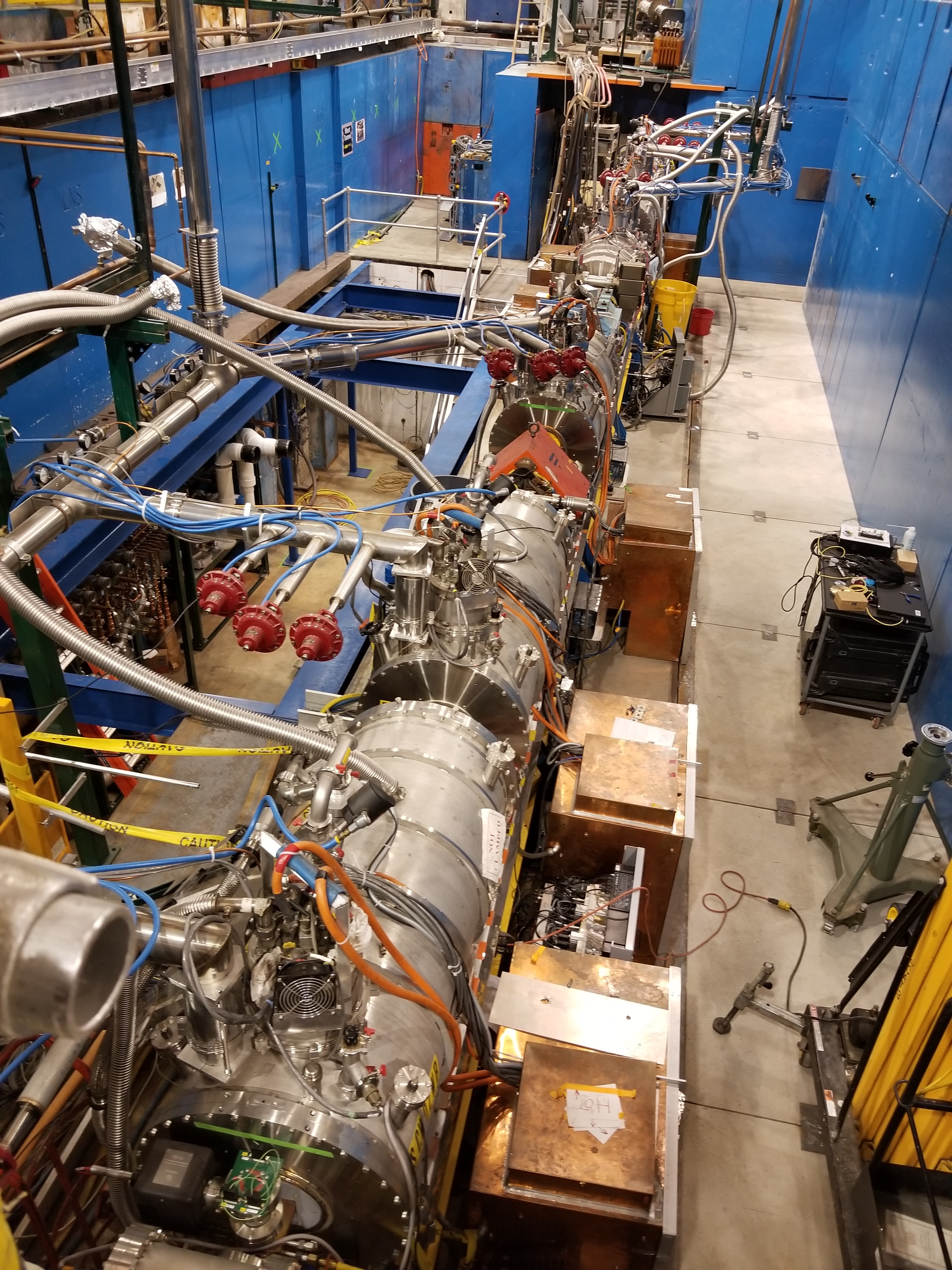
A section of the CESR beamline.

The Cornell Electron Storage Ring (CESR, pronounced Caesar) is a particle accelerator operated by Cornell University and located 40 feet beneath a football field on their Ithaca campus. The accelerator has contributed to fundamental research in high energy physics and accelerator physics, as well as solid state physics, biology, art history and other fields through its use as a synchrotron light source. For many years, CESR held the world luminosity record for electron-positron collisions.

CESR pioneered several new accelerator techniques, including superconducting radio-frequency cavities and pretzel orbits.

== Electron Positron Collider ==
CESR was built in the already existing tunnel for the 10 GeV synchrotron and was originally constructed as an electron-positron collider. The project was led by Cornell physicist Maury Tigner who devised a "fiendishly clever" method of filling the ring with positrons generated by the synchrotron. It delivered its first collisions in April 1979 setting the world record for the highest luminosity electron-positron collisions. From this point on, the accelerator provided a reliable beam of high energy electrons and positrons to the CLEO and CUSB particle detectors. The name CLEO is a play on words and not an acronym. The name was chosen because it is short for Cleopatra due to her relationship with Caesar.

Collisions occurred at a center of mass energy ranging from 3.5 GeV to 12 GeV at its peak. This turned out to be ideal for the study of the B meson and data from these collisions provided physicists with many new insights into the physics of fundamental particles. The CLEO detector alone resulted in over 200 publications in Physical Review Letters. CESR installed sets of wiggler magnets in the early 2000s to allow operation at lower energies for the CLEO-c project. The accelerator continued to provide useful data until the early 2000s when it was superseded by more powerful machines.

== Cornell High Energy Synchrotron Source (CHESS) ==
CESR now powers the state of the art synchrotron light source called CHESS. This NSF user facility is one of only five in the world that can generate the high energy x-rays needed for research in fields such as solid state physics, biology, material science, art history, among others. Over 1000 scientists from all over the world visit CHESS to perform their research every year. Data gathered at CHESS has contributed to the multiple Nobel Prizes including the 2003 and 2009 Nobel Prize in Chemistry. In 2017, CHESS received a $15 million award (called CHESS-U) from the state of New York to help upgrade their facility. CHESS-U will increase the brightness of the x-ray source by a factor of 1,000 allowing CHESS to maintain world leadership as an x-ray user facility. In addition, several more x-ray hutches will be added to the facility which will enable more scientists to share the powerful x-ray beam at the same time.

== See also ==
- List of accelerators in particle physics
