= Donald J. Summers =

American physicist (1951–2021)

- Born: March 24, 1951; Santa Clara County, California
- Died: March 3, 2021 (aged 69); Oxford, Mississippi
- Education: University of California, Santa Barbara
- Known for: Physics
- Scientific career
- Fields: Physics
- Workplaces: University of California, Santa Barbara; Fermilab; University of Wisconsin, Madison; University of Mississippi
- Doctoral advisor: Rollin John Morrison

Donald J. Summers (March 24, 1951 – March 3, 2021) was a particle physicist who worked on experiments at several labs, including Fermilab, CERN, SLAC, and KEK.

== Education ==
Summers received his undergraduate degree from the University of California, Santa Cruz. He completed his PhD from the University of California, Santa Barbara in 1984, where his PhD advisor was Rollin John Morrison. While he was a graduate student, Summers worked on Fermilab's experiment E-516, a pioneering study of charmed particles, which are hadron particles containing one or more charm quarks. He helped with the design, construction, and reconstruction program for the experiment's SLIC (segmented liquid ionization calorimeter) and assisted Michael Witherell with data analysis for this experiment.

== Career ==
After completing his PhD, Summers held a postdoctoral position with the University of Wisconsin, Madison at CERN from 1984 to 1987, where he worked on UA1, the experiment that had discovered the W and Z bosons. He held another postdoctoral position at Fermilab from 1987 to 1989. He was a professor at the University of Mississippi from 1989 until his death in 2021. During this time, he also worked on the Compact Muon Solenoid Experiment at CERN, the BaBar Experiment at SLAC, the Belle II Experiment at KEK, and the Deep Underground Neutrino Experiment at Fermilab, among others.
