= Asymmetry =

Absence of, or a violation of, symmetry

In geometry and other fields, asymmetry is an absence or violation of symmetry in an object or process, such that some transformation (such as reflection in space) results in an observable difference. Symmetry is an important property of both physical and abstract systems and it may be displayed in precise terms or in more aesthetic terms. The absence of or violation of symmetry that are either expected or desired can have important consequences for a system.

== In organisms ==
Due to how cells divide in organisms, asymmetry in organisms is fairly usual in at least one dimension, with biological symmetry also being common in at least one dimension.

Louis Pasteur proposed that biological molecules are asymmetric because the cosmic [i.e. physical] forces that preside over their formation are themselves asymmetric. While at his time, and even now, the symmetry of physical processes are highlighted, it is known that there are fundamental physical asymmetries, starting with time.

=== Asymmetry in biology ===
Asymmetry is an important and widespread trait, having evolved numerous times in many organisms and at many levels of organization (ranging from individual cells, through organs, to entire body shapes). Benefits of asymmetry sometimes have to do with improved spatial arrangements, such as the left human lung being smaller, and having one fewer lobe than the right lung to make room for the asymmetrical heart. In other examples, division of function between the right and left half may have been beneficial and has driven the asymmetry to become stronger. Such an explanation is usually given for mammalian hand or paw preference (handedness), an asymmetry in skill development. Training the neural pathways in a skill with one hand (or paw) may take less effort than doing the same with both hands.

Nature also provides several examples of handedness in traits that are usually symmetric. The following are examples of animals with obvious left-right asymmetries:

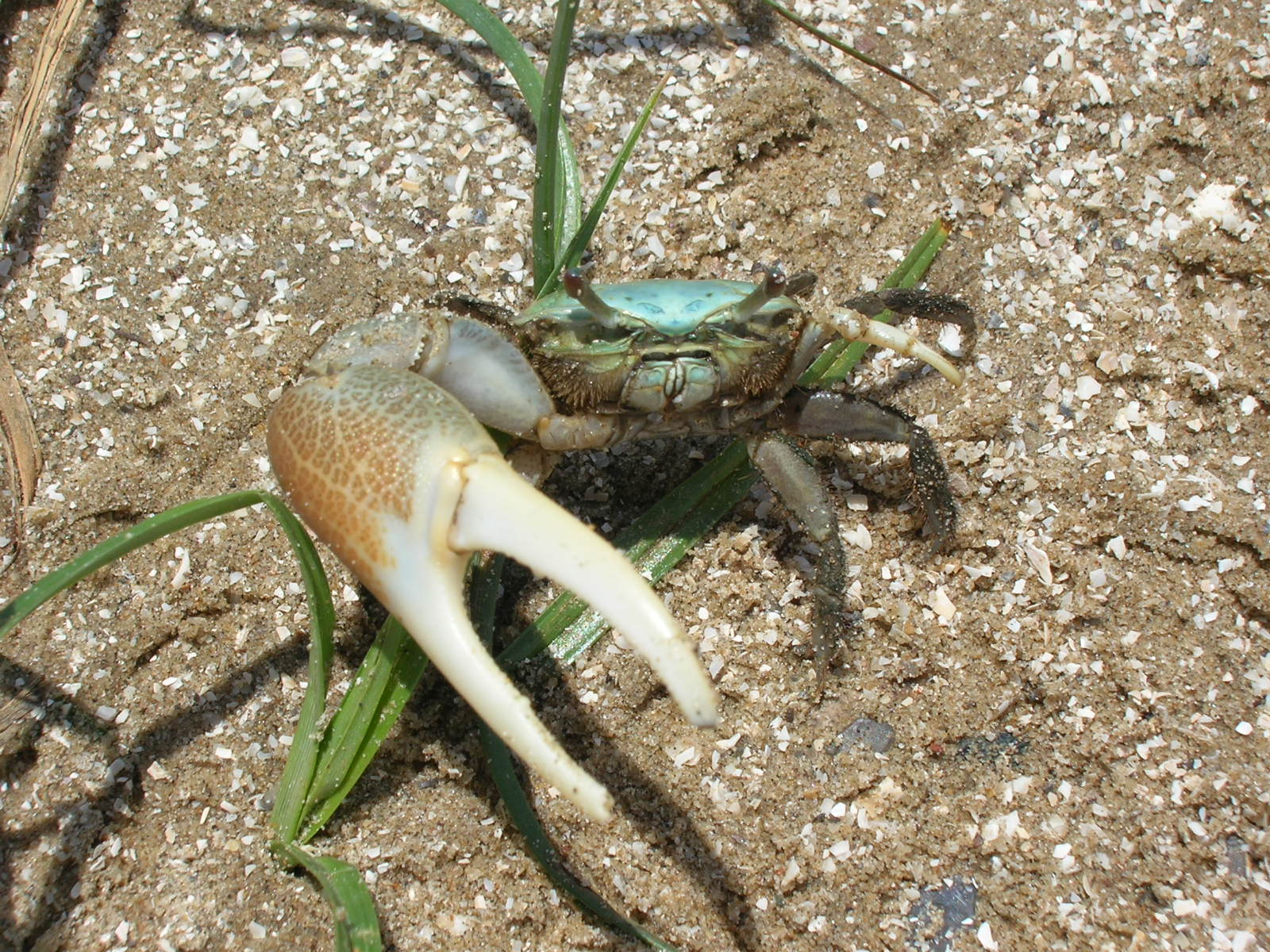
Male fiddler crab, Uca pugnax

- Most snails, because of torsion during development, show remarkable asymmetry in the shell and in the internal organs.
- Male fiddler crabs have one big claw and one small claw.
- The narwhal's tusk is a left incisor which can grow up to ten feet in length and forms a left-handed helix.
- Flatfish have evolved to swim with one side upward, and as a result have both eyes on one side of their heads.
- Several species of owls exhibit asymmetries in the size and positioning of their ears, which is thought to help locate prey.
- Many animals (ranging from insects to mammals) have asymmetric male genitalia. The evolutionary cause behind this is, in most cases, still a mystery.

=== As an indicator of unfitness ===
- Certain disturbances during the development of the organism, resulting in birth defects.
- Injuries after cell division that cannot be biologically repaired, such as a lost limb from an accident.

Since birth defects and injuries are likely to indicate poor health of the organism, defects resulting in asymmetry often put an animal at a disadvantage when it comes to finding a mate. For example, a greater degree of facial symmetry is seen as more attractive in humans, especially in the context of mate selection. In general, there is a correlation between symmetry and fitness-related traits such as growth rate, fecundity and survivability for many species. This means that, through sexual selection, individuals with greater symmetry (and therefore fitness) tend to be preferred as mates, as they are more likely to produce healthy offspring.

== In structures ==
Pre-modern architectural styles tended to place an emphasis on symmetry, except where extreme site conditions or historical developments lead away from this classical ideal. To the contrary, modernist and postmodern architects became much more free to use asymmetry as a design element.

While most bridges employ a symmetrical form due to intrinsic simplicities of design, analysis and fabrication and economical use of materials, a number of modern bridges have deliberately departed from this, either in response to site-specific considerations or to create a dramatic design statement.

Some asymmetrical structures

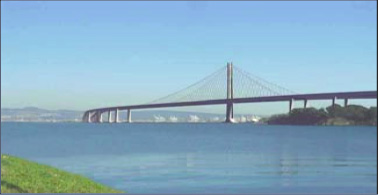
Eastern span replacement of the San Francisco – Oakland Bay Bridge

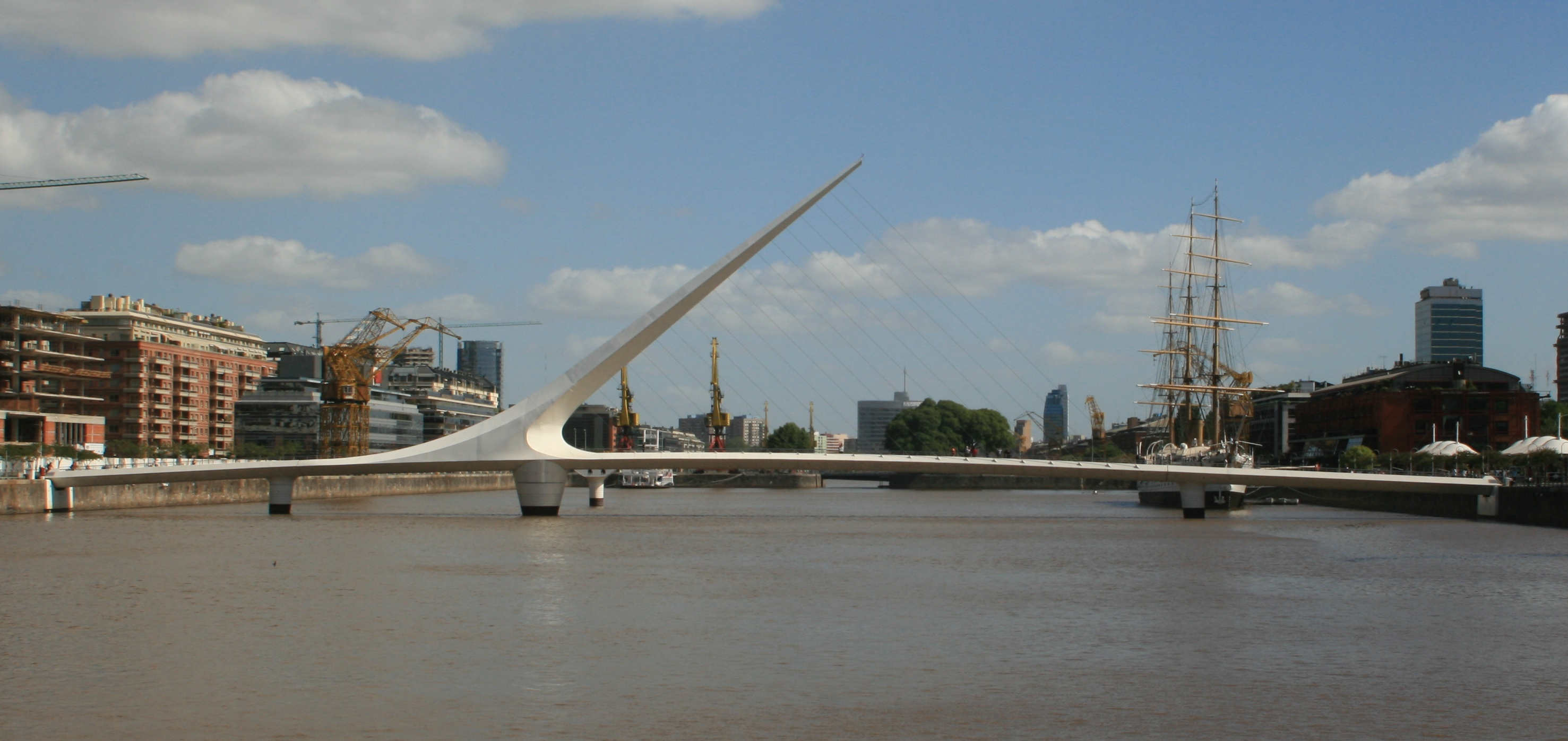
Puente de la Mujer

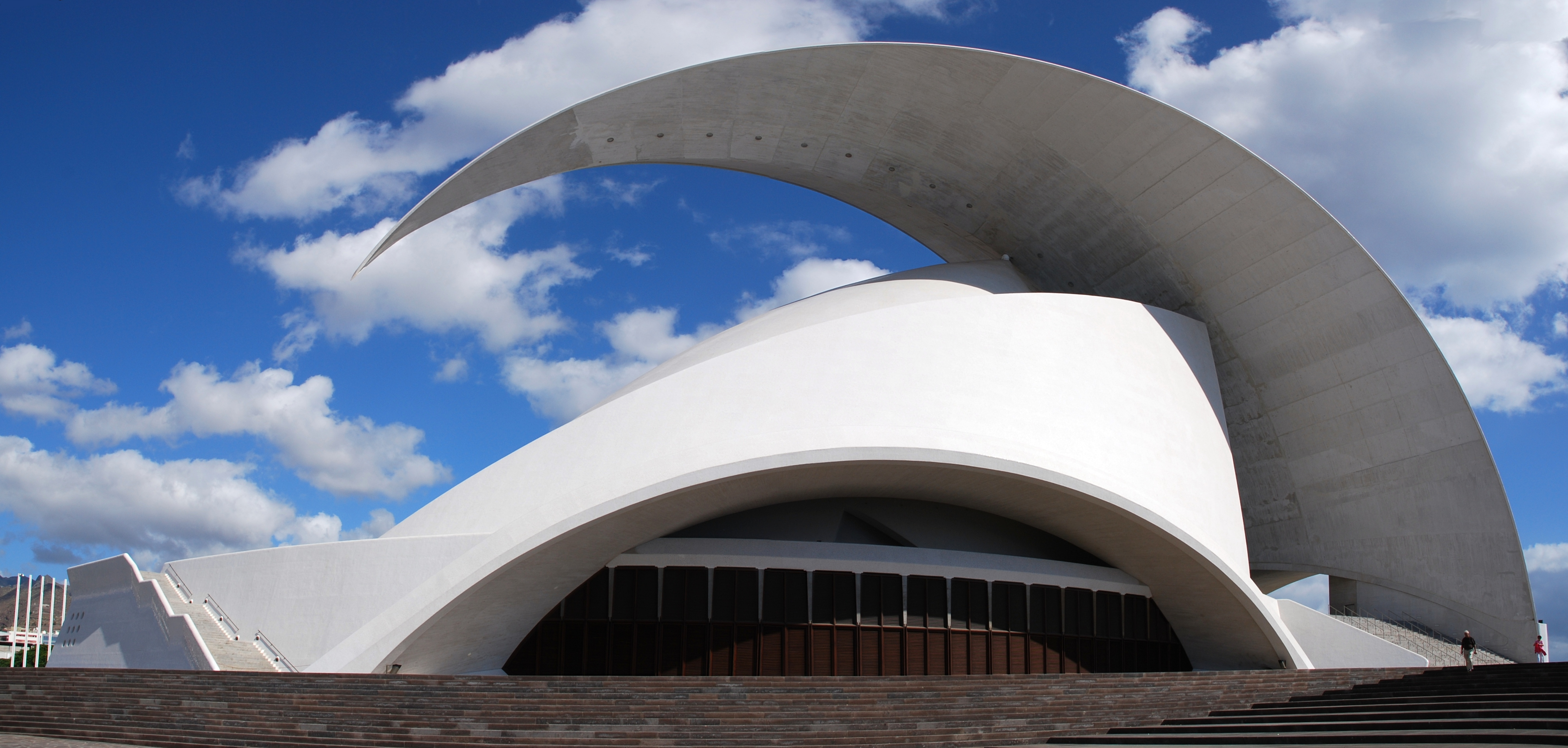
Auditorio de Tenerife

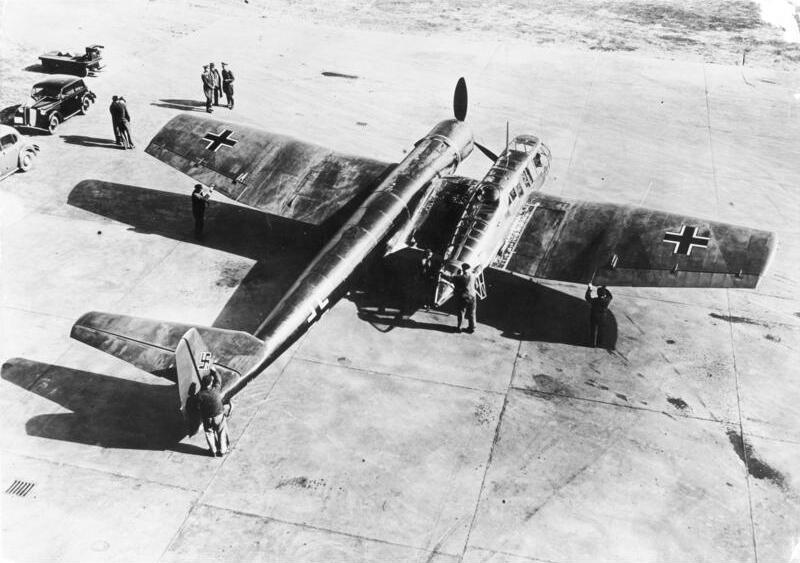
Blohm & Voss BV 141 aircraft

A proa, a form of outrigger canoe

=== In fire protection ===
In fire-resistance rated wall assemblies, used in passive fire protection, including, but not limited to, high-voltage transformer fire barriers, asymmetry is a crucial aspect of design. When designing a facility, it is not always certain, that in the event of fire, which side a fire may come from. Therefore, many building codes and fire test standards outline, that a symmetrical assembly, need only be tested from one side, because both sides are the same. However, as soon as an assembly is asymmetrical, both sides must be tested and the test report is required to state the results for each side. In practical use, the lowest result achieved is the one that turns up in certification listings. Neither the test sponsor, nor the laboratory can go by an opinion or deduction as to which side was in more peril as a result of contemplated testing and then test only one side. Both must be tested in order to be compliant with test standards and building codes.

== In mathematics ==
In mathematics, asymmetry can arise in various ways. Examples include asymmetric relations, asymmetry of shapes in geometry, asymmetric graphs et cetera.

In geometry, a figure is asymmetric if it does not have any reflectional, rotational, or translational symmetry (eg. a scalene triangle, where all sides and angles differ).

=== Lines of symmetry ===
When determining whether an object is asymmetrical, look for lines of symmetry. For instance, a square has four lines of symmetry, while a circle has infinite. If a shape has no lines of symmetry, then it is asymmetrical, but if an object has any lines of symmetry, it is symmetrical.

=== Asymmetric Relation ===
An asymmetric relation is a binary relation $R$ defined on a set of elements such that if $a R b$ holds for elements $a$ and $b$, then $b R a$ must be false. Stated differently, an asymmetric relation is characterized by a necessary absence of symmetry of the relation in the opposite direction.

Inequalities exemplify asymmetric relations. Consider elements $a$ and $b$. If $a$ is less than $b$ ($a < b$), then $a$ cannot be greater than $b$ ($a \ngtr b$). This highlights how the relations "less than", and similarly "greater than", are not symmetric.

In contrast, if $a$ is equal to $b$ ($a = b$), then $b$ is also equal to $a$ ($b = a$). Thus the binary relation "equal to" is a symmetric one.

=== Asymmetric Tensors ===
In general an Asymmetric tensor is defined by the change of signs$(-/+)$ of its solution under the interchange of two indexes.

The Epsilon-tensor is an example of an asymmetric tensor. It is defined as:
$$\epsilon_{ijk}= \begin{cases}
1 & \text{if } (i,j,k) \in \{(123),(231),(312)\} \\
-1 & \text{if } (i,j,k) \in \{(213),(321),(132)\}\\
0 & \text{else}
\end{cases}$$

, with $i,j,k \in \{1,2,3\}$. For even or uneven permutations of the indexes the tensor is either 1 or -1.

== In chemistry ==
Certain molecules are chiral; that is, they cannot be superposed upon their mirror image. Chemically identical molecules with different chirality are called enantiomers; this difference in orientation can lead to different properties in the way they react with biological systems.

== In physics ==
Asymmetry arises in physics in a number of different realms.

=== Thermodynamics ===
The original non-statistical formulation of thermodynamics was asymmetrical in time: it claimed that the entropy in a closed system can only increase with time. This was derived from the Second Law (any of the two, Clausius' or Lord Kelvin's statement can be used since they are equivalent) and using the Clausius' Theorem (see Kerson Huang ISBN 978-0471815181). The later theory of statistical mechanics, however, is symmetric in time. Although it states that a system significantly below maximum entropy is very likely to evolve towards higher entropy, it also states that such a system is very likely to have evolved from higher entropy.

=== Particle physics ===
Symmetry is one of the most powerful tools in particle physics, because it has become evident that practically all laws of nature originate in symmetries. Violations of symmetry therefore present theoretical and experimental puzzles that lead to a deeper understanding of nature. Asymmetries in experimental measurements also provide powerful handles that are often relatively free from background or systematic uncertainties.

==== Parity violation ====
Until the 1950s, it was believed that fundamental physics was left-right symmetric; i.e., that interactions were invariant under parity. Although parity is conserved in electromagnetism, strong interactions and gravity, it turns out to be violated in weak interactions. The Standard Model incorporates parity violation by expressing the weak interaction as a chiral gauge interaction. Only the left-handed components of particles and right-handed components of antiparticles participate in weak interactions in the Standard Model. A consequence of parity violation in particle physics is that neutrinos have only been observed as left-handed particles (and antineutrinos as right-handed particles).

In 1956–1957 Chien-Shiung Wu, E. Ambler, R. W. Hayward, D. D. Hoppes, and R. P. Hudson found a clear violation of parity conservation in the beta decay of cobalt-60. Simultaneously, R. L. Garwin, Leon Lederman, and R. Weinrich modified an existing cyclotron experiment and immediately verified parity violation.

==== CP violation ====
After the discovery of the violation of parity in 1956–57, it was believed that the combined symmetry of parity (P) and simultaneous charge conjugation (C), called CP, was preserved. For example, CP transforms a left-handed neutrino into a right-handed antineutrino. In 1964, however, James Cronin and Val Fitch provided clear evidence that CP symmetry was also violated in an experiment with neutral kaons.

CP violation is one of the necessary conditions for the generation of a baryon asymmetry in the early universe.

Combining the CP symmetry with simultaneous time reversal (T) produces a combined symmetry called CPT symmetry. CPT symmetry must be preserved in any Lorentz invariant local quantum field theory with a Hermitian Hamiltonian. As of 2006, no violations of CPT symmetry have been observed.

==== Baryon asymmetry of the universe ====
The baryons (i.e., the protons and neutrons and the atoms that they comprise) observed so far in the universe are overwhelmingly matter as opposed to anti-matter. This asymmetry is called the baryon asymmetry of the universe.

==== Isospin violation ====
Isospin is the symmetry transformation of the weak interactions. The concept was first introduced by Werner Heisenberg in nuclear physics based on the observations that the masses of the neutron and the proton are almost identical and that the strength of the strong interaction between any pair of nucleons is the same, independent of whether they are protons or neutrons. This symmetry arises at a more fundamental level as a symmetry between up-type and down-type quarks. Isospin symmetry in the strong interactions can be considered as a subset of a larger flavor symmetry group, in which the strong interactions are invariant under interchange of different types of quarks. Including the strange quark in this scheme gives rise to the Eightfold Way scheme for classifying mesons and baryons.

Isospin is violated by the fact that the masses of the up and down quarks are different, as well as by their different electric charges. Because this violation is only a small effect in most processes that involve the strong interactions, isospin symmetry remains a useful calculational tool, and its violation introduces corrections to the isospin-symmetric results.

==== In collider experiments ====
Because the weak interactions violate parity, collider processes that can involve the weak interactions typically exhibit asymmetries in the distributions of the final-state particles. These asymmetries are typically sensitive to the difference in the interaction between particles and antiparticles, or between left-handed and right-handed particles. They can thus be used as a sensitive measurement of differences in interaction strength and/or to distinguish a small asymmetric signal from a large but symmetric background.

- A forward-backward asymmetry is defined as A_{FB}=(N_{F}-N_{B})/(N_{F}+N_{B}), where N_{F} is the number of events in which some particular final-state particle is moving "forward" with respect to some chosen direction (e.g., a final-state electron moving in the same direction as the initial-state electron beam in electron-positron collisions), while N_{B} is the number of events with the final-state particle moving "backward". Forward-backward asymmetries were used by the LEP experiments to measure the difference in the interaction strength of the Z boson between left-handed and right-handed fermions, which provides a precision measurement of the weak mixing angle.
- A left-right asymmetry is defined as A_{LR}=(N_{L}-N_{R})/(N_{L}+N_{R}), where N_{L} is the number of events in which some initial- or final-state particle is left-polarized, while N_{R} is the corresponding number of right-polarized events. Left-right asymmetries in Z boson production and decay were measured at the Stanford Linear Collider using the event rates obtained with left-polarized versus right-polarized initial electron beams. Left-right asymmetries can also be defined as asymmetries in the polarization of final-state particles whose polarizations can be measured; e.g., tau leptons.
- A charge asymmetry or particle-antiparticle asymmetry is defined in a similar way. This type of asymmetry has been used to constrain the parton distribution functions of protons at the Tevatron from events in which a produced W boson decays to a charged lepton. The asymmetry between positively and negatively charged leptons as a function of the direction of the W boson relative to the proton beam provides information on the relative distributions of up and down quarks in the proton. Particle-antiparticle asymmetries are also used to extract measurements of CP violation from B meson and anti-B meson production at the BaBar and Belle experiments.

== See also ==
- Asymmetric multiprocessing
- Chirality
- Information asymmetry
