= Belle experiment =

1999-2010 Japanese particle physics experiment

Coordinates: 36°09′28″N 140°04′31″E

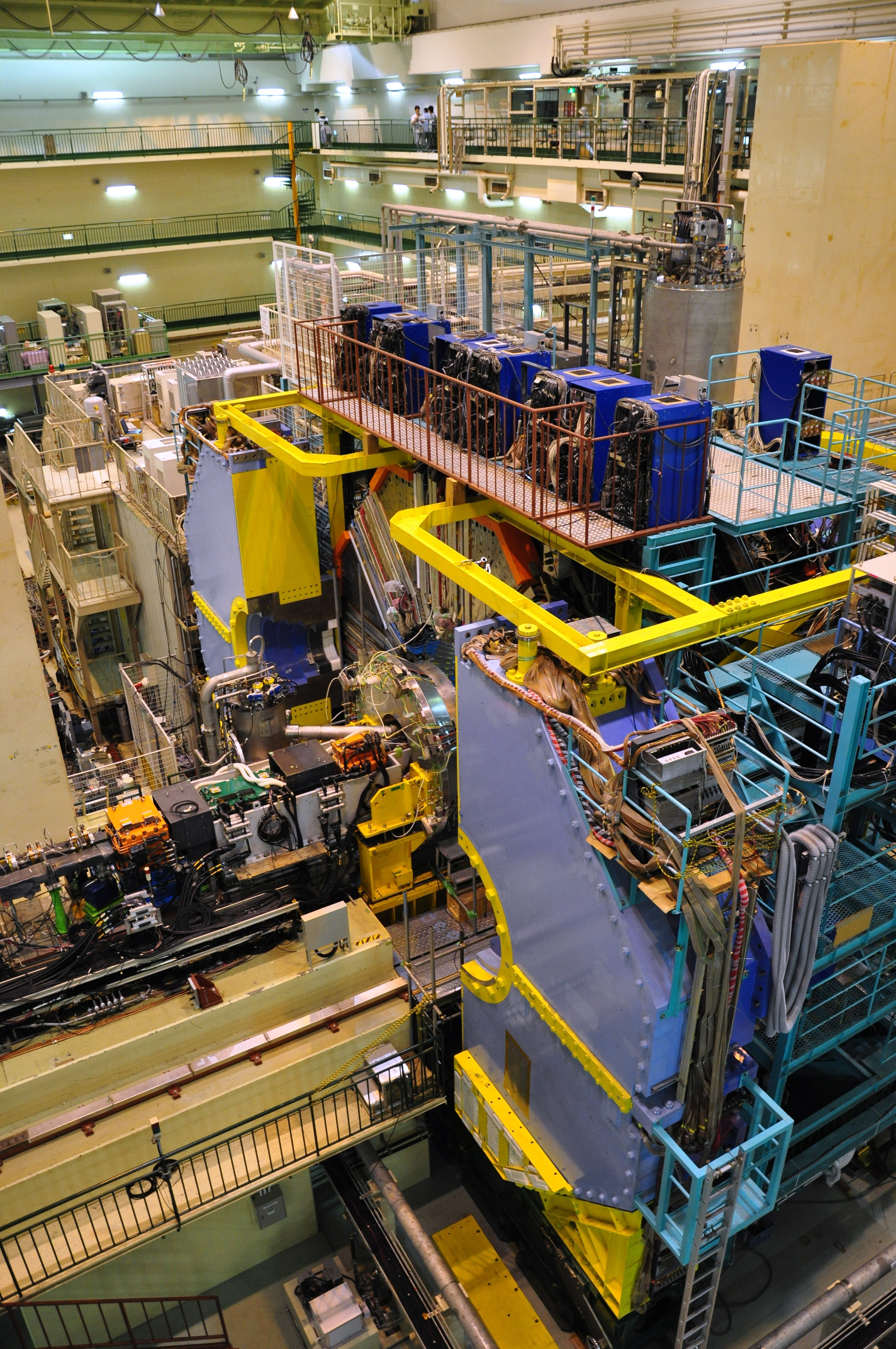
The Belle detector in Tsukuba Hall, KEK

The Belle experiment was a particle physics experiment conducted by the Belle Collaboration, an international collaboration of more than 400 physicists and engineers, at the High Energy Accelerator Research Organisation (KEK) in Tsukuba, Ibaraki Prefecture, Japan. The experiment ran from 1999 to 2010.

The Belle detector was located at the collision point of the asymmetric-energy electron–positron collider, KEKB. Belle at KEKB together with the BaBar experiment at the PEP-II accelerator at SLAC were known as the B-factories as they collided electrons with positrons at the center-of-momentum energy equal to the mass of the ϒ(4S) resonance which decays to pairs of B mesons.

The Belle detector was a hermetic multilayer particle detector with large solid angle coverage, vertex location with precision on the order of tens of micrometres (provided by a silicon vertex detector), good distinction between pions and kaons in the momenta range from 100 MeV/c to few GeV/c (provided by a Cherenkov detector), and a few-percent precision electromagnetic calorimeter (made of CsI(Tl) scintillating crystals).

The Belle II experiment is an upgrade of Belle that was approved in June 2010 and began operations in 2018. Belle II is located at SuperKEKB (an upgraded KEKB accelerator) which offers a 40-fold increase in instantaneous luminosity over its predecessor.

== Results ==
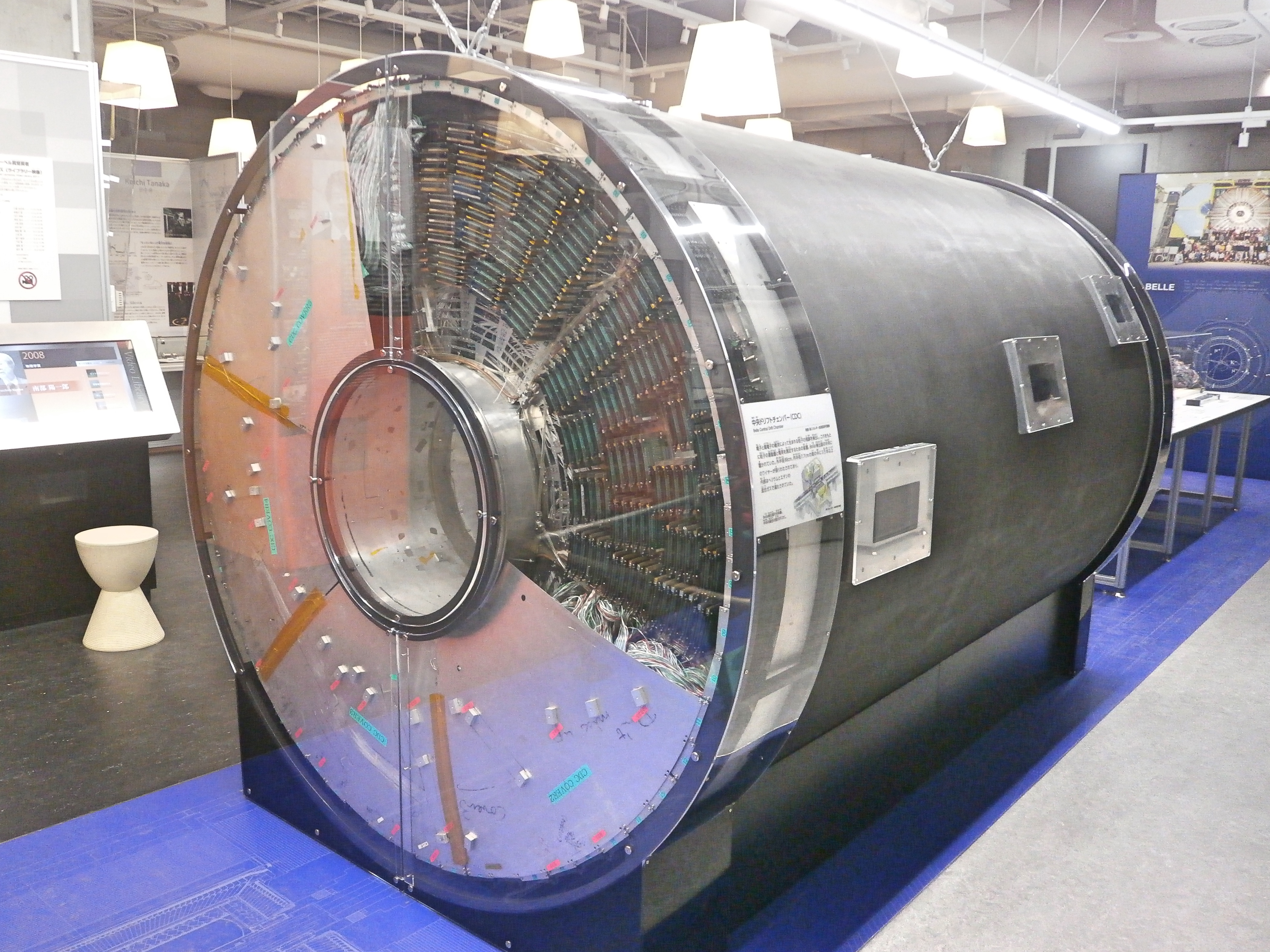
The retired central drift tracking chamber from Belle, now exhibited at the National Museum of Nature and Science.

The experiment was motivated by the search for CP-violation. However the experiment also performed extensive studies of rare decays, searches for exotic particles and precision measurements of the properties of D mesons, and tau particles. The experiment has resulted in almost 300 publications in physics journals.

Highlights of the Belle experiment include

- an observation of large CP-violation in the neutral B meson system
- measurement of the branching fraction of inclusive $B\to X_{s}\gamma$ decays
- observation of the $b\to sl^+l^-$ transition with $B \to K l^+ l^-$ and $B \to K^* l^+ l^-$
- measurement of $\phi_3$ using the $B \to D K, D \to K_S \pi^+ \pi^-$ Dalitz plot
- measurement of the CKM quark mixing matrix elements $|V_{ub}|$ and $|V_{cb}|$
- observation of direct CP-violation in $B^0 \to \pi^+ \pi^-$ and $B^0 \to K^- \pi^+$
- observation of $b \to d$ transitions
- evidence for $B \to \tau \nu$
- observations of a number of new particles including the X(3872)

== Data samples ==
The KEKB accelerator was the world's highest luminosity machine at the time. A large fraction of the data was collected at the ϒ(4S). The instantaneous luminosity exceeded 2.11×10^{34} cm^{−2}·s^{−1}. The integrated luminosity collected at the ϒ(4S) mass was about 710 fb^{−1} (corresponding to 771 million BB̅ meson pairs). About 10% of the data was recorded below the ϒ(4S) resonance in order to study backgrounds. In addition, KEKB carried out special runs at the ϒ(5S) resonance to study B_{s} mesons as well as on the ϒ(1S), ϒ(2S) and ϒ(3S) resonances to search for evidence of Dark Matter and the Higgs Boson. The samples of ϒ(1S), ϒ(2S) and ϒ(5S) collected by Belle are the world largest samples available.

== See also ==
- B-factory
- B–B̅ oscillation
