= Crab cavity =

Particle accelerator technology

Schematic of the beam crossing with the tilt from the crab cavities. To provide maximum tilt at the crossing point, there is a 90 degree phase advance from the first cavity to the interaction point (IP). The correcting crab cavity must then be placed a further 90 degrees from the IP to correct the tilt, since a kick can only be done to the momentum. Therefore, there is a total of 180 degrees phase advance between the crab cavities, meaning that the momentum after the IP has the opposite sign as it was initially given. The correcting kick should thus have the same sign as the kick that created the crabbing.

Crab cavities are a form of electromagnetic cavity used in particle accelerators to provide a transverse deflection to particle bunches. They can be used to provide rotation to a charged particle bunch by applying a time varying magnetic field. This rotation of the bunch can be used as a diagnostic tool to measure the length of a bunch (the longitudinal dimension is projected into the transverse plane, and imaged) or as a means of increasing the luminosity at an interaction point of a collider if the colliding beams cross each other at an angle (then called crab crossing). The KEKB accelerator introduced this technology in its last upgrade.

== See also ==
- Cavity resonator
