= BaBar experiment =

Nuclear physics experiment

The BaBar experiment, or simply BaBar, is an international collaboration of more than 500 physicists and engineers studying the subatomic world at energies of approximately ten times the rest mass of a proton (~10 GeV). Its design was motivated by the investigation of charge-parity violation. BaBar is located at the SLAC National Accelerator Laboratory, which is operated by Stanford University for the Department of Energy in California.

== Physics ==
BaBar was set up to understand the disparity between the matter and antimatter content of the universe by measuring Charge Parity violation. CP symmetry is a combination of Charge-conjugation symmetry (C symmetry) and Parity symmetry (P symmetry), each of which are conserved separately except in weak interactions. BaBar focuses on the study of CP violation in the B meson system. The name of the experiment is derived from the nomenclature for the B meson (symbol B) and its antiparticle (symbol B̅, pronounced B bar). The experiment's mascot was accordingly chosen to be Babar the Elephant.

If CP symmetry holds, the decay rate of B mesons and their antiparticles should be equal. Analysis of secondary particles produced in the BaBar detector showed this was not the case – in the summer of 2002, definitive results were published based on the analysis of 87 million B/B̅ meson-pair events, clearly showing the decay rates were not equal. Consistent results were found by the Belle experiment at the KEK laboratory in Japan.

CP violation was already predicted by the Standard Model of particle physics, and well established in the neutral kaon system (K/K̅ meson pairs). The BaBar experiment has increased the accuracy to which this effect has been experimentally measured. Currently, results are consistent with the Standard Model, but further investigation of a greater variety of decay modes may reveal discrepancies in the future.

The BaBar detector is a multilayer particle detector. Its large solid angle coverage (near hermetic), vertex location with precision on the order of 10 μm (provided by a silicon vertex detector), good pion–kaon separation at multi-GeV momenta (provided by a novel Cherenkov detector), and few-percent precision electromagnetic calorimetry (CsI(Tl) scintillating crystals) allow a list of other scientific searches apart from CP violation in the B meson system. Studies of rare decays and searches for exotic particles and precision measurements of phenomena associated with mesons containing bottom and charm quarks, as well as phenomena associated with tau leptons are possible.

The BaBar detector ceased operation on 7 April 2008, but data analysis is ongoing.

== Detector description ==
Principle of silicon vertex detectors: the particles' origin, where the event that created them occurred, can be found by extrapolating backwards from the charged regions (red) left on the sensors.

The BaBar detector is cylindrical with the interaction region at the center. In the interaction region, 9 GeV electrons collide with 3.1 GeV antielectrons (sometimes called positrons) to produce a center-of-mass collision energy of 10.58 GeV, corresponding to the ϒ(4S) resonance. The ϒ(4S) decays immediately into a pair of B mesons – half the time B^{+}B^{−} and half the time B^{0}B̅^{0}. To detect the particles there are a series of subsystems arranged cylindrically around the interaction region. These subsystems are as follows, in order from inside to outside:

- Silicon Vertex Tracker (SVT)

Made from 5 layers of double-sided silicon strips, the SVT records charged particle tracks very close to the interaction region inside BaBar.

- Drift Chamber (DCH)

Less expensive than silicon, the 40 layers of wires in this gas chamber detect charged particle tracks out to a much larger radius, providing a measurement of their momenta. In addition, the DCH also measures the energy loss of the particles as they pass through matter. See Bethe-Bloch formula.

- Detector of Internally Reflected Cherenkov Light (DIRC)

The DIRC is composed of 144 fused silica bars which radiate and focus Cherenkov radiation to differentiate between kaons and pions.

- Electromagnetic Calorimeter (EMC)

Made from 6580 CsI crystals, the EMC identifies electrons and antielectrons, which allows for the reconstruction of the particle tracks of photons (and thus of neutral pions (π^{0})) and of "long Kaons" (K_{L}), which are also electrically neutral.

- Magnet

The Magnet produces a 1.5 T field inside the detector, which bends the tracks of charged particles allowing deduction of their momentum.

- Instrumented Flux Return (IFR)

The IFR is designed to return the flux of the 1.5 T magnet, so it is mostly iron but there is also instrumentation to detect muons and long kaons. The IFR is broken into 6 sextants and two endcaps. Each of the sextants has empty spaces which held the 19 layers of Resistive Plate Chambers (RPC), which were replaced in 2004 and 2006 with Limited Streamer Tubes (LST) interleaved with brass. The brass is there to add mass for the interaction length since the LST modules are so much less massive than the RPCs. The LST system is designed to measure all three cylindrical coordinates of a track: which individual tube was hit gives the φ coordinate, which layer the hit was in gives the ρ coordinate, and finally the z-planes atop the LSTs measure the z coordinate.

== Notable events ==
On 9 October 2005, BaBar recorded a record luminosity just over 1 × 10^{34} cm^{−2}s^{−1} delivered by the PEP-II positron-electron collider. This represents 330% of the luminosity that PEP-II was designed to deliver, and was produced along with a world record for stored current in an electron storage ring at 1.73 A, paired with a record 2.94 A of positrons. "For the BaBar experiment, higher luminosity means generating more collisions per second, which translates into more accurate results and the ability to find physics effects they otherwise couldn't see."

In 2008, BaBar physicists detected the lowest energy particle in the bottomonium quark family, η_{b}. Spokesperson Hassan Jawahery said: "These results were highly sought after for over 30 years and will have an important impact on our understanding of the strong interactions."

In May 2012 BaBar reported that their recently analyzed data may suggest deviations from predictions of the Standard Model of particle physics. The experiments see two particle decays, $B \to D^* \tau \nu$ and $B \to D \tau \nu$, happen more often than the Standard Model predicts. In this type of decay, a B meson decays into a D or D* meson, a tau-lepton and an antineutrino. While the significance of the excess (3.4 sigma) is not enough to claim a break from the Standard Model, the results are a potential sign of something amiss and are likely to impact existing theories. In 2015 results from LHCb and the Belle experiment strengthen the evidence (to 3.9 sigma) of possible physics beyond the Standard Model in these decay processes, but still not at the gold standard 5 sigma level of significance.

== Data record ==
Run	Period	Integrated luminosity (fb^{−1})
1	22 October 1999 – 28 October 2000	22.93
2	2 February 2001 – 30 June 2002	68.19
3	8 December 2002 – 27 June 2003	34.72
4	17 September 2003 – 31 July 2004	109.60
5	16 April 2005 – 17 August 2006	146.61
6	25 January 2007 – 4 September 2007	86.06
7	13 December 2007 – 7 April 2008	45.60
Total	22 October 1999 – 7 April 2008	513.70

== See also ==
- B-factory
- B-Bbar oscillation
