= KEKB (accelerator) =

Japanese particle accelerator

Coordinates: 36°9′17″N 140°4′19″E

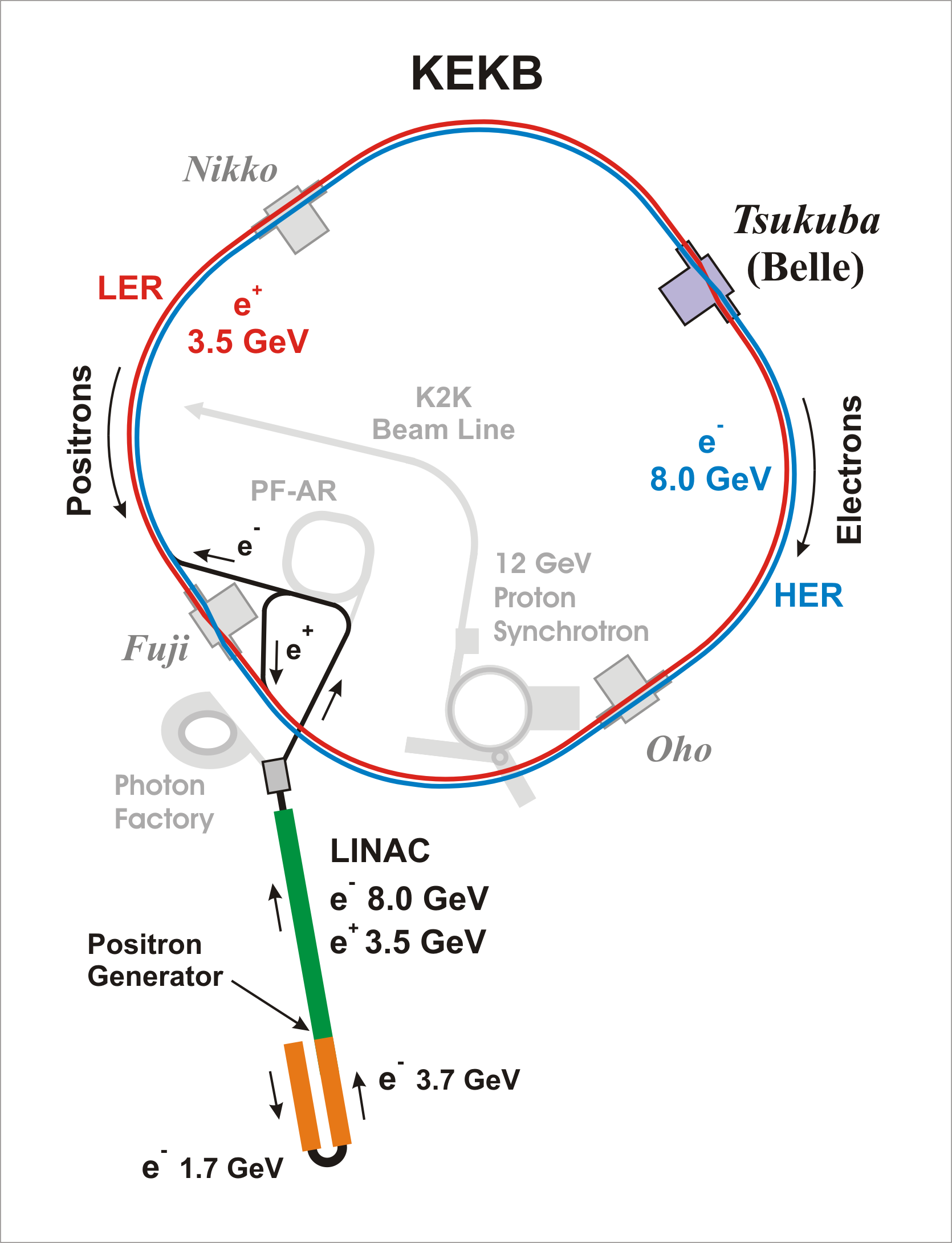
A schematic of the KEKB accelerator complex.

KEKB was a particle accelerator used in the Belle experiment to study CP violation. KEKB was located at the KEK (High Energy Accelerator Research Organisation) in Tsukuba, Ibaraki Prefecture, Japan. It has been superseded by its upgrade, the SuperKEKB accelerator (located at the same site). The SuperKEKB is a luminosity upgrade of KEKB. SuperKEKB had its first particle collisions in 2018. The SuperKEKB accelerator produces particle beams for the Belle II experiment, which is an upgrade of the Belle experiment (located at the same site as Belle). The Belle experiments studied b-quark hadrons to research CP violation.

KEKB was called a B-factory for its copious production of B-mesons which provide a golden mode to study and measure the CP violation due to its property of decaying into other lighter mesons. KEKB was basically an asymmetric electron–positron collider, with electrons having the energy of 8 GeV and positrons having the energy of 3.5 GeV, giving 10.58 GeV centre-of-mass energy, which is equal to the mass of the Υ(4S) meson.

There are basically two rings for accelerating electrons and positrons. The ring for electrons, having energy of 8 GeV, is called the high-energy ring (HER), while the ring for positrons, having energy of 3.5 GeV, is called low-energy ring (LER). The HER and LER are constructed side by side in the tunnel, which has been excavated already in the past for the former TRISTAN accelerator. TRISTAN was the first site to confirm vacuum polarization around an electron and operated at center-of-mass energies between 50 and 61.4 GeV. There were three experiments at the old TRISTAN accelerator: Venus, Topaz, and AMY. The RF cavities in the HER use superconducting RF (SRF) technology, whereas the RF cavities in the LER use a normal conducting design denoted ARES. The circumference of each ring is 3016 m, having four straight sections. In the KEKB, there is only one interaction point in the "Tsukuba area", where the Belle experiment is located. The other areas (called "Fuji", "Nikko" and "Oho") are currently not actively used by an experiment.

Since the energy of the electrons and positrons is asymmetric, the B meson pairs are created with a Lorentz boost βγ of 0.425, allowing measurements of the B meson decay times via the distance from the (known) collision point.

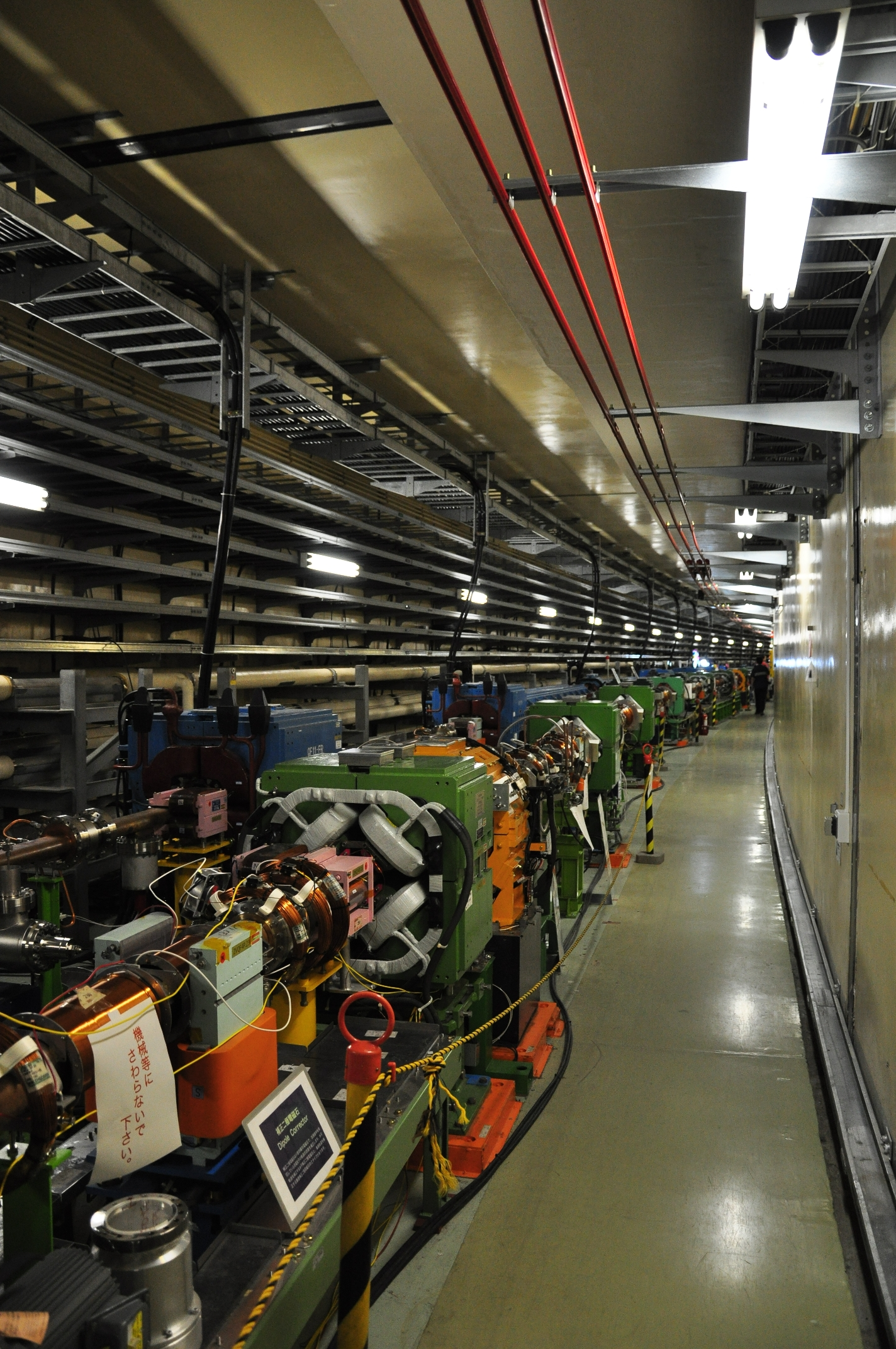
A section of the KEKB accelerator. The left-hand ring (blue) is for electrons, and the right-hand ring (green) is for positrons.

KEKB's leading finite crossing angle interaction design provides its high luminosity. In the last upgrade, KEKB installed crab cavities on each of its accelerating beams to rotate the bunches of accelerating electrons or positrons, hoping to further increase its luminosity. However, the improvement is not clear and currently under tuning.

== See also ==
- SuperKEKB
- Crab cavity
- Superconducting radio frequency
