= Belle II experiment =

Japanese particle physics experiment

Coordinates: 36°9′28″N 140°4′30″E

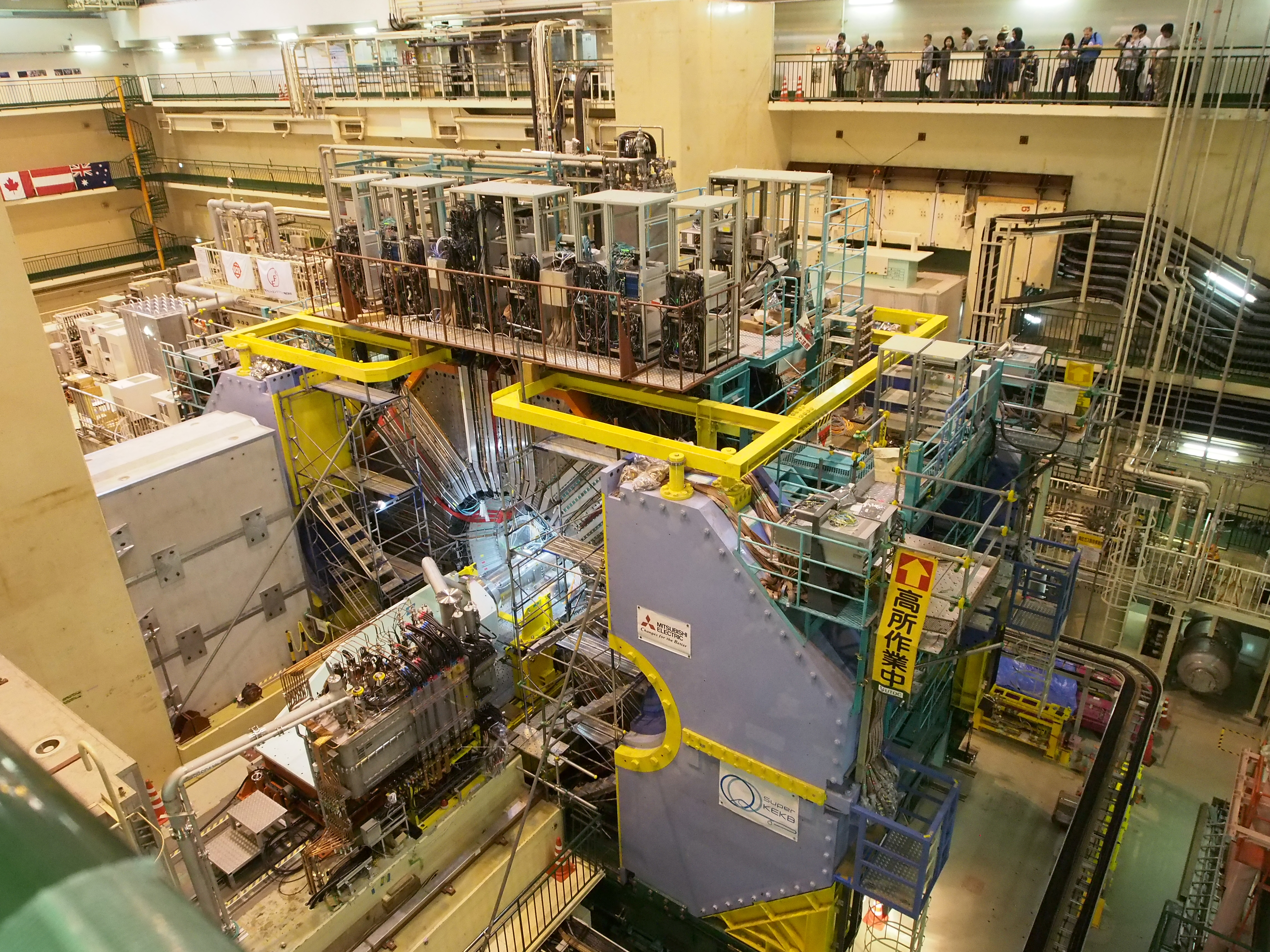
The opened Belle II detector before installation of the inner tracking detectors.

The Belle II experiment is a particle physics experiment designed to study the properties of B mesons (heavy particles containing a bottom quark) and other particles. Belle II is the successor to the Belle experiment, and commissioned at the SuperKEKB accelerator complex at KEK in Tsukuba, Ibaraki prefecture, Japan. The Belle II detector was "rolled in" (moved into the collision point of SuperKEKB) in April 2017. Belle II started taking data in early 2018. Over its running period, Belle II is expected to collect around 50 times more data than its predecessor, mostly due to a 40-fold increase in an instantaneous luminosity provided by SuperKEKB as compared to the previous KEKB accelerator.

== Physics program ==
Many interesting analyses of the Belle and BaBar experiments were limited by statistical uncertainties, which was the main motivation to build a new generation of B-factory - Belle II.

The target dataset is 50,000 fb^{−1} at Belle II compared to 988 fb^{−1} (with 711 fb^{−1} at the Υ(4S) energy) at Belle. The dataset of good runs from Belle II before Long shutdown 1 was 424 fb^{−1} (with 363 fb^{−1} at the Υ(4S) energy.) Belle II's dataset at the Υ(4S) energy surpassed that of Belle's on May 17, 2026, and as of the 4th of June, it had reached 757 fb^{−1}.

This immense dataset would allow studies of rare physics processes, which were out of reach for the previous e^{+} e^{−} experiments and improve precision on the already measured physics observables.

The physics program of Belle II includes the studies of the following particles or processes:

- B-meson
- Charm meson
- Bottomonium
- Charmonium
- Tau-lepton
- Dark sector
- Low-multiplicity processes

The majority of the Belle II dataset will be recorded at Upsilon(4S) center-of-mass energy, while a small portion of it will be taken at Upsilon(5S) and as energy scans.

== Detector composition ==
Belle II is a general purpose high-energy particle detector with almost full solid angle coverage. It has a cylindrical shape to cover the e^{+} e^{−} collisions happening on the central axis of the detector. The detector is asymmetric in beam direction, because the initial energy of the electron beam is larger than the positron beam. Much of the original Belle detector has been upgraded to cope with the higher instantaneous luminosity provided by the SuperKEKB accelerator.

The main components are the following, from the innermost to the outermost systems.:

- Beryllium beam pipe at a minimum radius of 10 mm from the beam
- PiXel Detector (PXD) is composed of two cylindrical layers of depleted field effect transistor (DEPFET) pixels, provide as precise position measurement of the charged particle trajectories. First layer is only 14 mm away from the beam. So far, only two ladders of the second PXD layer have been installed.
- Silicon Vertex Detector (SVD) - 8 layers of silicon strip sensors arranged in cylindrical barrel and an inclined endcap towards electron direction for better coverage. The SVD and PXD detectors sometimes are referred as VerteX Detector (VXD). The total VXD size has been tuned to cover most of the typical $K^0_S$ travel distance.
- Central Drift Chamber (CDC) is a wire chamber central tracking system, which provides the measurement of momentum and charge of the charged particles produced by the collisions as well as particle type identification (PID) via their energy depositions.
- Aerogel ring-imaging Cherenkov detector (aRICH) provides PID information about the charged particle going into the forward direction.
- Time Of Propagation (TOP) counter consisting of quartz bars utilising totally internally reflected Cherenkov photons and measuring the time of propagation, which is used for PID.
- Electromagnetic calorimeter (ECL) a highly segmented array of thallium-doped caesium iodide CsI(Tl) crystals assembled in a projective geometry to measure energies of the neutral final state particles such as photons, $K^0_L$ and neutrons, as well as PID.
- Superconducting solenoid, which provides a 1.5 tesla magnetic field, which bends the trajectories of the final state charged particles to measure their charge and momentum.
- $K^0_L$ and Muon detector (KLM) used to identify $K^0_L$ energy depositions as well as for muon PID.

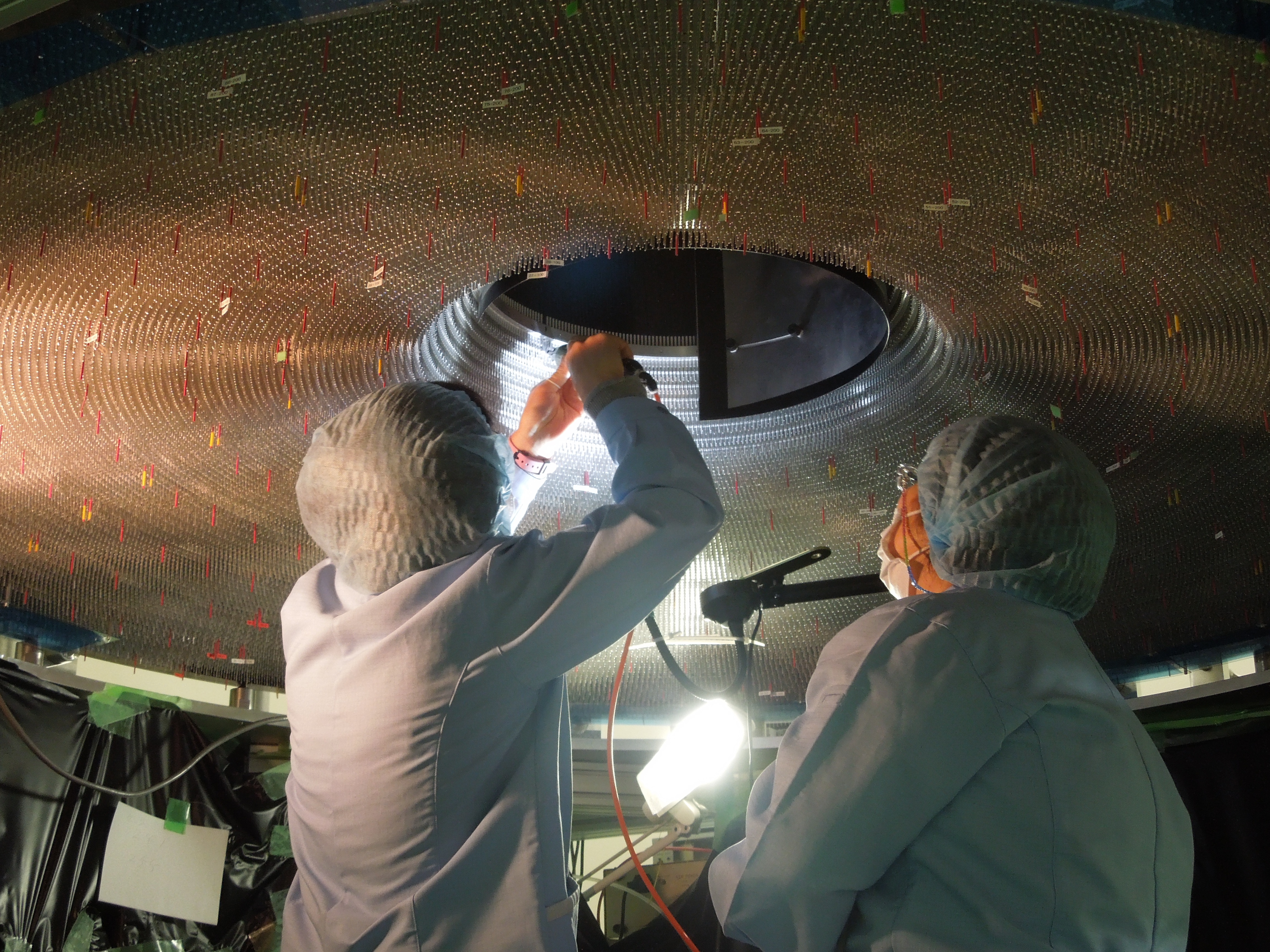
Construction work on the Central Drift Chamber (CDC) of the Belle II experiment

== Timeline ==
The Belle II experiment data taking is separated into three phases:

- Phase I — completed Feb–June 2016: SuperKEKB commissioning to characterize the beam environment;
- Phase II — started early 2018, running without the nominal inner silicon-based VXD tracking system to measure the beam-induced background radiation in the innermost tracking system. During this phase the VXD subdetector has been replaced by Beam Exorcism for a Stable ExperimenT II or BEAST II system which was used to test various tracking technologies and a total integrated luminosity of 500 pb$^{-1}$ has been collected;
- Phase III — started 2019: data taking with the complete Belle II detector;

On November 22, 2018, the Belle II detector was completed with the installation of the VerteX Detector (VXD). On March 25, 2019, the first collisions of the actual physics program were detected.

On 15 June 2020, the SuperKEKB reached an instantaneous luminosity of 2.22×10^{34} cm^{−2}s^{−1} — surpassing the LHC's record of 2.14×10^{34} cm^{−2}s^{−1} set with proton–proton collisions in 2018. A few days later, SuperKEKB pushed the luminosity record to 2.4×10^{34} cm^{−2}s^{−1}. In June 2022 the luminosity record was nearly doubled to 4.7×10^{34} cm^{−2}s^{−1}.

== Scientific personnel ==
The Belle II experiment is being governed by Belle II Collaboration, which is an international worldwide scientific community.

The Belle II Collaboration has designed, produced, assembled and is currently operating the Belle II experiment. The collaboration handles the collision data recorded at the experiment, performs the data analysis and delivers the results in form of scientific journal articles, conference talks, etc.

As on October 5, 2023, it included 1,174 members from 124 institutes and 27 countries around the globe.

== Experiment software ==
In October 2021 the Software development team within the Belle II Collaboration has published Belle II Analysis Software Framework or basf2, as open-source software on GitHub.

This is the main package used to simulate, reconstruct and analyse the recorded collision events at the Belle II experiment and there are several other separate satellite packages, used for DAQ, computation of the systematic uncertainties, etc.

The backend of the reconstruction and analysis libraries are written in C++, while the analysis steering and facade are implemented in Python language.

== See also ==
- B-factory
- B–B̅ oscillation
- LHCb experiment
