= Trunov House =

Historic house in Rostov-on-Don, Russia

Coordinates: 47°13′01″N 39°42′10″E

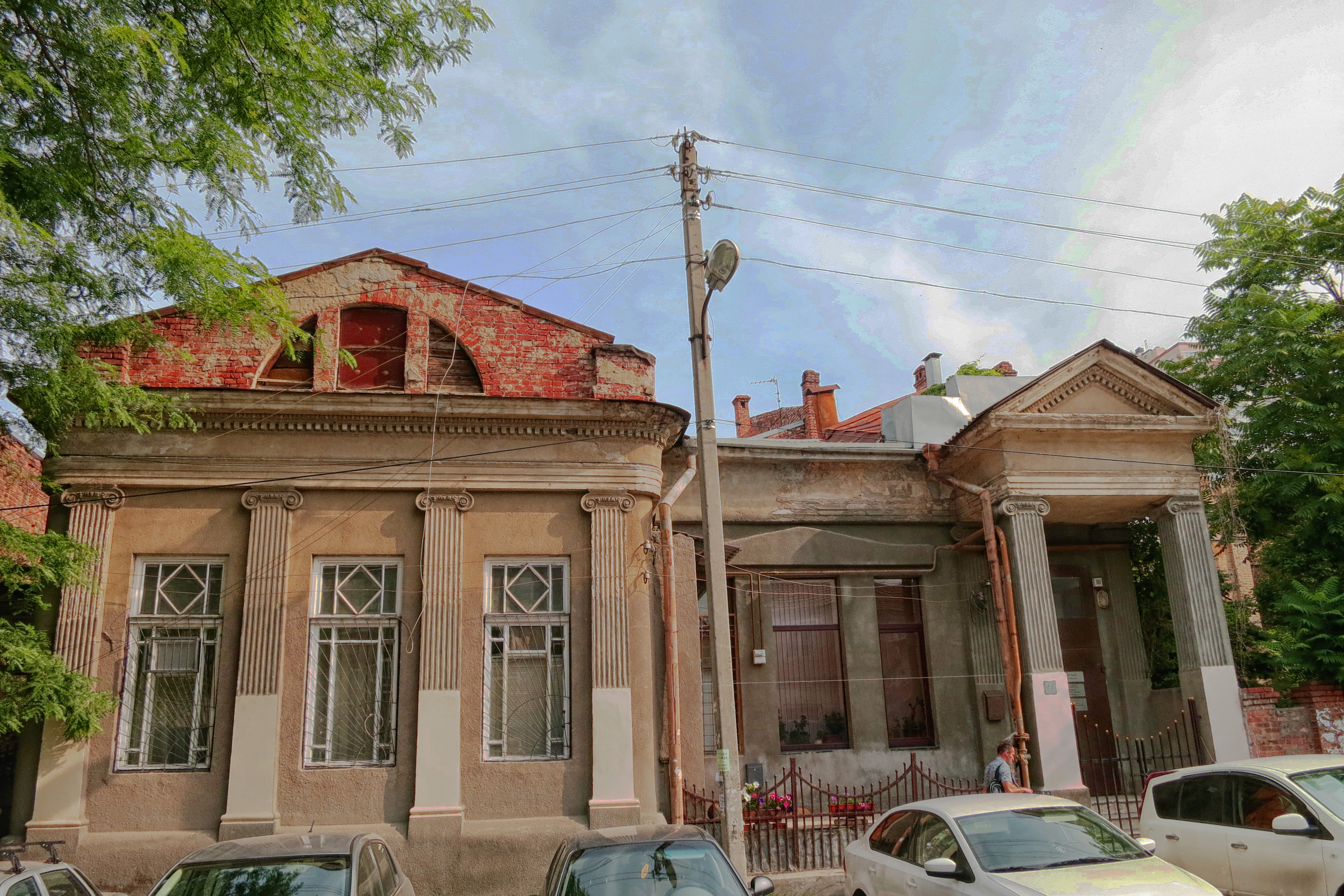
Trunov House. Rostov-on-Don, Temernitskaya street, 13. 2015

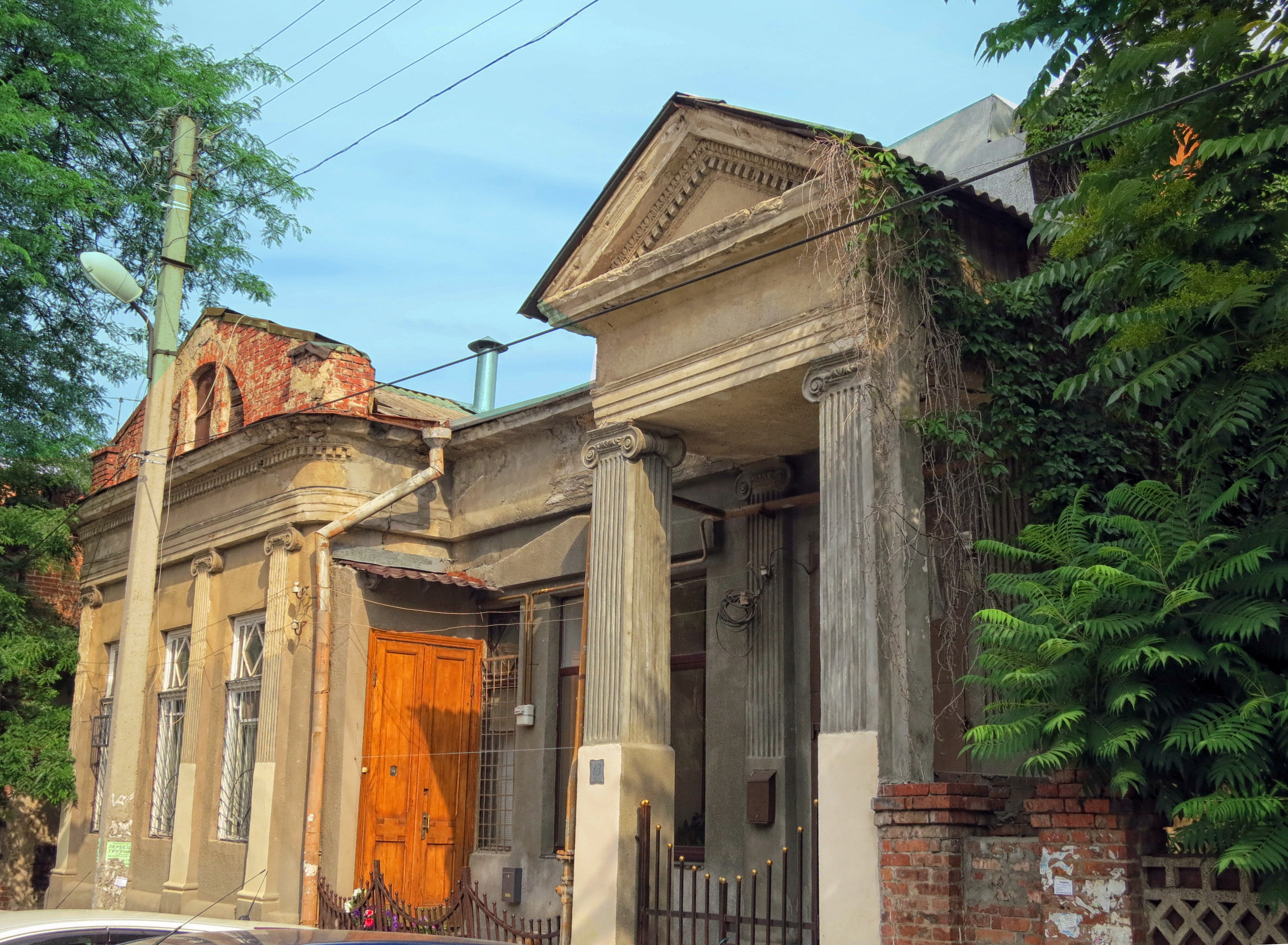
Rostov-on-Don, Trunov House, 2015

Trunov House (Russian: Особняк Трунова, romanized: Osobnyak Trunova) is a historic house built in the late 19th - early 20th century, located at 13 Temernitskaya Street in Rostov-on-Don, Russia.

== History ==
In the 1880s the building was owned by Nakhchivan wine trader Jeremiah Ayvazov. In 1888 the house was bought by George Trunov.

After 1907 the house was owned by George's brother Ivan. After a few years Ivan Trunov mortgaged the house and got in the Bank 2,500 rubles. In 1914, the house was bought by Eudoxia Rudukhina for 5,000 rubles. The house was nationalized in 1920 and Rudukhina. In the twenty-first century, the building was used for law offices.

== Design ==
The asymmetrical building is constructed of brick-covered plaster.
