= Resistive plate chamber =

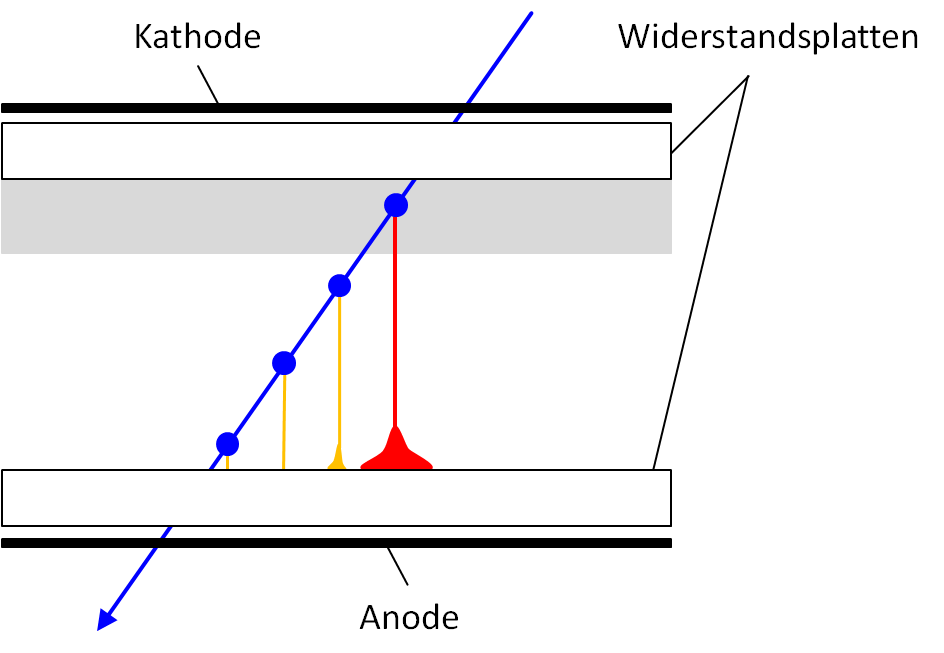
RPC detector visualization

A Resistive plate chamber (RPC) is a particle detector widely used in high energy physics. They are used for detecting muons in most of the modern experiments including ALICE,ATLAS, CMS, Belle II and BES III.
