= SuperKEKB =

Particle collider in Tsukuba, Japan

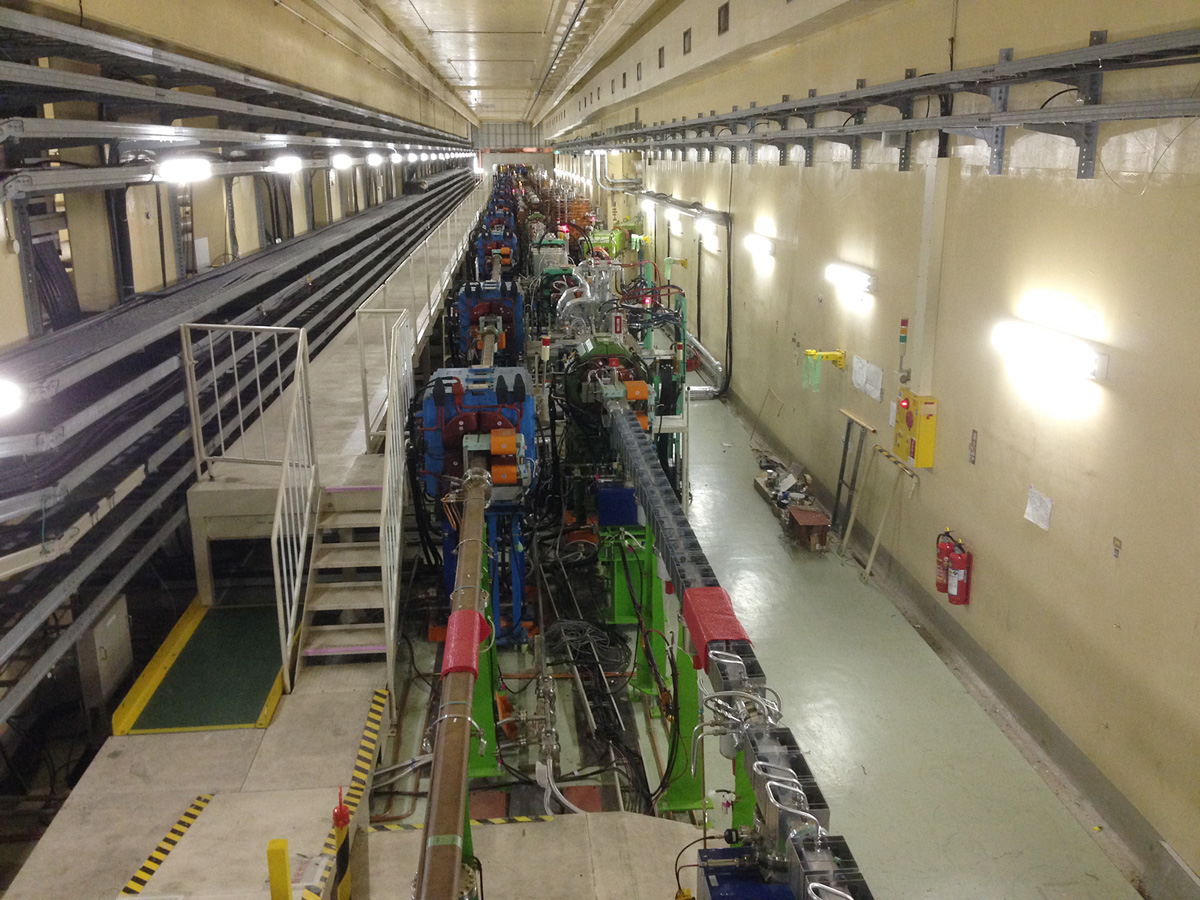

SuperKEKB is a particle collider located at KEK (High Energy Accelerator Research Organization) in Tsukuba, Ibaraki Prefecture, Japan. SuperKEKB collides electrons with positrons at the centre-of-momentum energy close to the mass of the Υ(4S) resonance making it a second-generation B-factory for the Belle II experiment. The accelerator is an upgrade to the KEKB accelerator, providing approximately 40 times higher luminosity, due mostly to superconducting quadrupole focusing magnets. The accelerator achieved "first turns" (first circulation of electron and positron beams) in February 2016. First collisions occurred on 26 April 2018. At 20:34 on 15 June 2020, SuperKEKB achieved the world's highest instantaneous luminosity for a colliding-beam accelerator, setting a record of 2.22×10^{34} cm^{−2}s^{−1}.

== Description ==
The SuperKEKB design reuses many components from KEKB. Under normal operation, SuperKEKB collides electrons at 7 GeV with positrons at 4 GeV (compared to KEKB at 8 GeV and 3.5 GeV respectively). The centre-of-momentum energy of the collisions is therefore at the mass of the Υ(4S) resonance (10.58 GeV/c^{2}). The accelerator will also perform short runs at energies of other Υ resonances, in order to obtain samples of other B mesons and baryons. The asymmetry in the beam energy provides a relativistic Lorentz boost to the B meson particles produced in the collision. The direction of the higher-energy beam determines the 'forward' direction, and that affects the design of much of the Belle II detector.

As with KEKB, SuperKEKB consists of two storage rings: one for the high-energy electron beam (the High Energy Ring, HER) and one for the lower energy positron beam (the Low Energy Ring, LER). The accelerator has a circumference of 3016 m with four straight sections and experimental halls in the centre of each, named "Tsukuba", "Oho", "Fuji", and "Nikko". The Belle II experiment is located at the single interaction point in Tsukuba Hall.

== Luminosity ==
The target luminosity for SuperKEKB is 6.5×10^{35} cm^{−2}s^{−1}, this is 30 times larger than the luminosity at KEKB. The improvement is mostly due to a so-called 'nano-beam' scheme, originally proposed for the cancelled SuperB experiment. In the nano-beam scheme at SuperKEKB, the beams are squeezed in the vertical direction and the crossing angle is increased, which reduces the area of the crossing. The luminosity is further increased by a factor of two, due to a higher beam current than KEKB. The focus and crossing angle is achieved by two new superconducting quadrupole magnets at the interaction point that were installed in February 2017.

On 15 June 2020, SuperKEKB set a new world record for the highest instantaneous luminosity for a colliding-beam accelerator: 2.22×10^{34} cm^{−2}s^{−1}. The previous world record of 2.14×10^{34} cm^{−2}s^{−1} was achieved by LHC in 2018. Since then, SuperKEKB has improved its own record, reaching 5.1×10^{34} cm^{−2}s^{−1} in December 2024.

== See also ==
- KEKB
- Large Electron-Positron Collider
- Large Hadron Collider
