= Hassan Jawahery =

Iranian-American physicist

- Born: Iran
- Education: University of Tehran; Tufts University
- Awards: Elected Fellow of the American Physical Society (APS) (2004)
- Scientific career
- Fields: Particle physics
- Workplaces: University of Maryland, College Park; Syracuse University; SLAC; CERN

Hassan Jawahery is an Iranian-American physicist and former spokesperson for the BaBar Collaboration. He received his B.S. in Physics from Tehran University in Iran and his Ph.D. in Physics from Tufts University. He is a professor of Physics at the University of Maryland and has worked on OPAL, CLEO, BaBar, SuperB, LHCb and the PDG.

The BaBar Collaboration comprises about 600 physicists from institutions in 10 countries, and his position as its spokesman has made him internationally known. He is also an editor of the Annual Review of Nuclear and Particle Science.

During his spokesmanship of the BaBar Collaboration, the accelerator detected and measured the lowest energy state of the bottomonium quark family (ηb). Jawahery stated: "These results were highly sought after for over 30 years and will have an important impact on our understanding of the strong interactions."
