= B-factory =

Particle collider experiment

In particle physics, a B-factory, or sometimes a beauty factory, is a particle collider experiment designed to produce and detect a large number of B mesons so that their properties and behavior can be measured with small statistical uncertainty. Tau leptons and D mesons are also copiously produced at B-factories.

== History and development ==
A sort of "prototype" or "precursor" B-factory was the HERA-B experiment at DESY that was planned to study B-meson physics in the 1990–2000s, before the actual B-factories were constructed/operational. However, usually HERA-B is not considered a B-factory.

Two B-factories were designed and built in the 1990s, and they operated from late 1999 onward: the Belle experiment at the KEKB collider in Tsukuba, Japan, and the BaBar experiment at the PEP-II collider at SLAC in California, United States. They were both electron-positron colliders with the center of mass energy tuned to the ϒ(4S) resonance peak, which is just above the threshold for decay into two B mesons (both experiments took smaller data samples at different centers of mass energies). BaBar prematurely ceased data collection in 2008 due to budget cuts, but Belle ran until 2010, when it stopped data collection both because it had reached its intended integrated luminosity and because construction was to begin on upgrades to the experiment (see below).

== Current experiments ==
Three "next generation" B-factories were to be built in the 2010s and 2020s: SuperB near Rome in Italy; Belle II, an upgrade to Belle, and SuperPEP-II, an upgrade to the PEP-II accelerator. SuperB was canceled, and the proposal for SuperPEP-II was never acted upon. However, Belle II successfully started taking data in 2018 and is currently the only next-generation B-factory in operation.

In addition to Belle II there is the LHCb-experiment at the LHC (CERN), which started operations in 2010 and studies primarily the physics of bottom-quark containing hadrons, and thus could be understood to be a B-factory of this "next generation." But LHCb is not usually referred to as a B-factory as the experiment and (perhaps more importantly) the corresponding collider (that is, the LHC) are not used solely for the study of b-quark particles but have other purposes beside b-quark physics.

== See also ==
- B–B̅ oscillations
- b-tagging
- HERA-B
- KEKB
- SuperKEKB
- Belle experiment
- Belle II
- Stanford Linear Accelerator
- BaBar experiment
- Neutrino Factory
- Higgs factory
