= Photon Factory =

Synchrotron in Tsukuba, Japan

The Photon Factory (PF) is a synchrotron located at KEK, in Tsukuba, Japan, about fifty kilometres from Tokyo.

== History ==
The Photon Factory turned on its synchrotron for the first time in 1982, becoming the first light source accelerator in Japan to produce x-rays. In 1997, it joined the Institute of Materials Structure Science (IMSS), a Japanese-run international particle physics organization based at KEK.

The current head of the Photon Factory is N. Igarashi.

== Research and design ==
There are two major facilities, the Photon Factory itself which is a 2.5GeV synchrotron with a beam current of around 450mA, and the PF-AR 'Advanced Ring for Pulsed X-Rays', which is a 6.5GeV machine running in a single-bunch mode with a beam current of around 60mA. It operates with a pulse width of about 100 picoseconds.

The Photon Factory's photon accelerator is one of the Institute of Materials Structure Science's four quantum beams used for particle physics research. Its macromolecular crystallography beam is used substantially for Japan's structural genomics project. More recently, the Photon Factory has partnered with the Saha Institute and Jawaharlal Nehru Centre in India to create the Indian Beam, which is open to Indian particle and nuclear physicists to use for experiments in power diffraction, scattering, and reflectivity.
