= Accelerator Test Facility (Japan) =

The Accelerator Test Facility (KEK-ATF) is a test accelerator in the KEK laboratory in Tsukuba, Japan. It is a test bed for production of the beam for the proposed International Linear Collider (ILC) linear electron-positron collider. Its main goal is to create the super-low-emittance beam which is needed for the ILC.
