= Oops-Leon =

Mistaken subatomic particle discovery

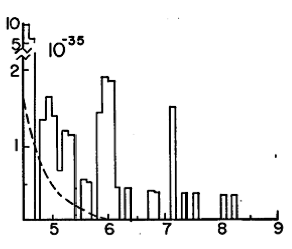
A plot counting the rate of production of electron–positron pairs as a function of invariant mass (in GeV/c^{2}). The apparent peak around 6 GeV/c^{2} was initially identified as a new particle, but named Oops-Leon when it turned out not to exist.

Oops-Leon is the name given by particle physicists to what was thought to be a new subatomic particle "discovered" at Fermilab in 1976. The E288 experiment team, a group of physicists led by Leon Lederman who worked on the E288 particle detector, announced that a particle with a mass of about 6.0 GeV/c^{2}, which decayed into an electron and a positron, was being produced by the Fermilab particle accelerator. The particle's initial name was the Greek letter Upsilon ($\Upsilon$). After taking further data, the group discovered that this particle did not exist, and the "discovery" was named "Oops-Leon" as a pun on the original name and the first name of the E288 collaboration leader.

The original publication was based on an apparent peak (resonance) in a histogram of the invariant mass of electron-positron pairs produced by protons colliding with a stationary beryllium target, implying the existence of a particle with a mass of 6 GeV/c^{2} which was being produced and decaying into two leptons. An analysis showed that there was "less than one chance in fifty" that the apparent resonance was simply the result of a coincidence. Subsequent data collected by the same experiment in 1977 revealed that the resonance had been such a coincidence after all. However, a new resonance at 9.5 GeV/c^{2} was discovered using the same basic logic and greater statistical certainty, and the name was reused (see Upsilon particle).

Today's commonly accepted standard for announcing the discovery of a particle is that the number of observed events is 5 standard deviations (σ) above the expected level of the background. Since for a normal distribution of data, the measured number of events will fall within 5σ over 99.9999% of the time, this means a less than one in a million chance that a statistical fluctuation would cause the apparent resonance. Under this standard, the Oops-Leon "discovery" might have gone unpublished.
