= KEK digital accelerator =

The High Energy Accelerator Research Organization KEK digital accelerator (KEK-DA) is a renovation of the KEK 500 MeV booster proton synchrotron, which was shut down in 2006. The existing 40 MeV drift tube LINAC and RF cavities have been replaced by an electron cyclotron resonance (ECR) ion source embedded in a 200 kV high-voltage terminal and induction acceleration cells, respectively.

In principle, a DA is capable of accelerating any species of ion in all possible charge states. The KEK-DA is characterized by specific accelerator components such as a permanent magnet X-band ECR ion source, a low-energy transport line, an electrostatic injection kicker, an extraction septum magnet operated in air, combined-function main magnets, and an induction acceleration system. The induction acceleration method, integrating modern pulse power technology and state-of-art digital control, is crucial for the rapid-cycle KEK-DA. The key issues of beam dynamics associated with low-energy injection of heavy ions are beam loss caused by electron capture and stripping as results of the interaction with residual gas molecules and the closed orbit distortion resulting from relatively high remanent fields in the bending magnets.

Disturbing as it may sound, imagine cancer cells located near a human organ, cells that need to be treated. One of the most promising treatments is to irradiate cancer cells with high energy particles in order to ionize the DNA molecules in the cancer cells, breaking the molecules and killing the cells. Doctors can use radiation to damage the cancer cells but not the healthy cells around them. Particle therapy uses a property of particles called the Bragg peak of energy disposition. When a particle travels through a material, it deposits energy to its surroundings as it travels, before it comes to a complete halt. It turns out that ions lose most of their energy immediately before they come to stop. This property can be used to target cancer cells that are located at certain distance from the skin, without affecting healthy tissues on its way. Another well known radiation therapy for cancer, X-ray therapy, cannot do this. The energy loss spectrum is much broader so that much of the energy gets absorbed by the surrounding, damaging unwanted regions. This feature remains the same for the recently developed technique called intensity-modulated radiotherapy CHHIP.

Sense and response would be the right words to describe the principle behind the digital particle accelerator. Instead of radio-frequency cavities, a digital accelerator ring is equipped with devices called induction accelerating cells. Particles travel around the ring in a form of a bunch. When a charged particle bunch passes a beam sensor, the system picks up the signals and calculates the timing to generate the pulse voltage required to accelerate the bunch, and then produces the pulse voltage energizing a transformer.

Using the intense, well-controlled heavy ion beam, scientists will be able to make mesh filters with nanometer-sized holes. Such a material could be used as a hemoglobin filter for blood. The intense ion beam can also alter material properties in diamond when shot into it to change the crystalline structure, making an insulator a conductor. This will allow production of three-dimensional nanometer-sized circuits. Applications of such circuit might completely change the industry of semiconductor devices, and may be useful for such future technologies as a quantum computer. Because heavy ions transfer energy to their surroundings much more efficiently than gamma-rays or X-rays, a digital accelerator will also make an excellent tool to induce mutations, by breaking off the DNA's double helix. This has important applications in environmental science. Combining induced mutation with genetic engineering is a promising approach to developing crops with larger yields of food and biofuels. On the other hand, astrophysicists plan to use the digital accelerator technology to create high-temperature, high-pressure conditions like those in Jupiter's core. Biologists also plan to use the digital accelerator to produce the interstellar environment and explore how life can be formed in the interstellar environment of the cosmic rays and cosmic medium.

== Sources ==
- T. Iwashita; T. Adachi; K. Takayama; K. W. Leo; T. Arai; Y. Arakida; M. Hashimoto; E. Kadokura; M. Kawai; T. Kawakubo; Tomio Kubo; K. Koyama; H. Nakanishi; K. Okazaki; K. Okamura; H. Someya; A. Takagi; A. Tokuchi; M. Wake (2011). "KEK digital accelerator". Physical Review Special Topics - Accelerators and Beams. 14 (7) 071301. Bibcode:2011PhRvS..14g1301I. doi:10.1103/PhysRevSTAB.14.071301. ISSN 1098-4402.
