= Leon M. Lederman =

American mathematician and physicist (1922–2018)

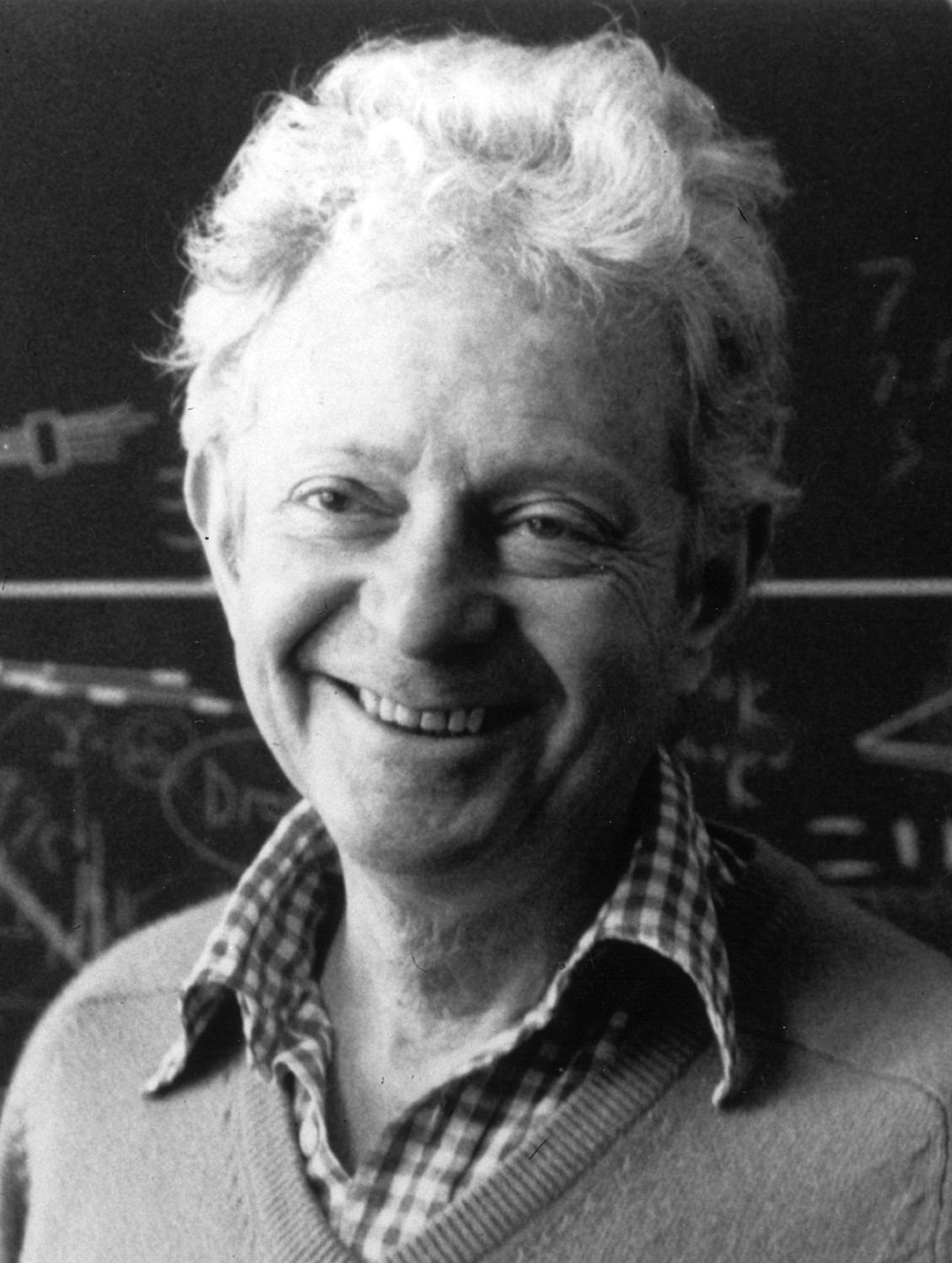
- Lederman in 1988
- Born: Leon Max Lederman; July 15, 1922; New York City, New York, U.S.
- Died: October 3, 2018 (aged 96); Rexburg, Idaho, U.S.
- Education: City College of New York (BA); Columbia University (PhD)
- Known for: Seminal contributions to neutrinos, bottom quark
- Spouse(s): Florence Gordon (divorced); Ellen Carr
- Awards: Nobel Prize in Physics (1988); Wolf Prize in Physics (1982); National Medal of Science (1965); Vannevar Bush Award (2012); William Procter Prize for Scientific Achievement (1991)
- Scientific career
- Fields: Physics
- Workplaces: Columbia University; Fermi National Accelerator Laboratory; Illinois Institute of Technology; University of Chicago
- Doctoral advisor: Eugene T. Booth

Leon Max Lederman (July 15, 1922 – October 3, 2018) was an American experimental physicist who received the Nobel Prize in Physics in 1988, along with Melvin Schwartz and Jack Steinberger, for research on neutrinos. He also received the Wolf Prize in Physics in 1982, along with Martin Lewis Perl, for research on quarks and leptons. Lederman was director of Fermi National Accelerator Laboratory (Fermilab) in Batavia, Illinois. He founded the Illinois Mathematics and Science Academy, in Aurora, Illinois in 1986.

== Early life and education ==
Lederman was born in New York City, New York, to Morris and Minna (Rosenberg) Lederman. His parents were Ukrainian-Jewish immigrants from Kyiv and Odesa. Lederman graduated from James Monroe High School in the South Bronx, and received his bachelor's degree from the City College of New York in 1943.

Lederman enlisted in the United States Army Signal Corps during World War II, intending to become a physicist after his service. Following his discharge in 1946, he enrolled at Columbia University's graduate school, receiving his Ph.D. in 1951.

== Academic career ==
Lederman became a faculty member at Columbia University, and he was promoted to full professor in 1958 as Eugene Higgins Professor of Physics. In 1960, on leave from Columbia, he spent time at CERN in Geneva as a Ford Foundation Fellow. He took an extended leave of absence from Columbia in 1979 to become director of Fermilab. Resigning from Columbia (and retiring from Fermilab) in 1989, he then taught briefly at the University of Chicago. He then moved to the physics department of the Illinois Institute of Technology, where he served as the Pritzker Professor of Science. In 1992, Lederman served as president of the American Association for the Advancement of Science.

Lederman, despite being a Nobel Prize winning professor, taught physics to non-physics majors at The University of Chicago.

Lederman served as president of the board of sponsors of the Bulletin of the Atomic Scientists, and at the time of his death was chair emeritus. He also served on the board of trustees for Science Service, now known as Society for Science & the Public, from 1989 to 1992, and was a member of the JASON defense advisory group. Lederman was also one of the main proponents of the "Physics First" movement. Also known as "Right-side Up Science" and "Biology Last," this movement seeks to rearrange the current high school science curriculum so that physics precedes chemistry and biology.

In the early 2000s, Lederman became the inaugural academic advisor of the International ArtScience Olympiad. He was an early supporter of Science Debate 2008, an initiative to get the then-candidates for president, Barack Obama and John McCain, to debate the nation's top science policy challenges. In October 2010, Lederman participated in the USA Science and Engineering Festival's Lunch with a Laureate program where middle and high school students engaged in an informal conversation with a Nobel Prize-winning scientist over a brown-bag lunch. Lederman was also a member of the USA Science and Engineering Festival's advisory board.

== Academic work ==
In 1956, Lederman worked on parity violation in weak interactions. R. L. Garwin, Leon Lederman, and R. Weinrich modified an existing cyclotron experiment, and they immediately verified the parity violation. They delayed publication of their results until after Wu's group was ready, and the two papers appeared back-to-back in the same physics journal. Among his achievements are the discovery of the muon neutrino in 1962 and the bottom quark in 1977. These helped establish his reputation as among the top particle physicists.

In 1976, a group of physicists, the E288 experiment team, led by Lederman announced that a particle with a mass of about 6.0 GeV was being produced by the Fermilab particle accelerator. After taking further data, the group discovered that this particle did not actually exist, and the "discovery" was named "Oops-Leon" as a pun on the original name, upsilon, and Lederman's first name. The name was reused for the upsilon meson, which the group discovered from subsequent data in 1977 at a higher mass of 9.5 GeV.

As the director of Fermilab, Lederman was a prominent supporter of the Superconducting Super Collider project, which was endorsed around 1983, and was a major proponent and advocate throughout its lifetime. Also at Fermilab, he oversaw the construction of the Tevatron, for decades the world's highest-energy particle collider. Lederman later wrote his 1993 popular science book The God Particle: If the Universe Is the Answer, What Is the Question? – which sought to promote awareness of the significance of such a project – in the context of the project's last years and the changing political climate of the 1990s. The increasingly moribund project was finally shelved that same year after some $2 billion of expenditures. In The God Particle he wrote, "The history of atomism is one of reductionism – the effort to reduce all the operations of nature to a small number of laws governing a small number of primordial objects" while stressing the importance of the Higgs boson.

In 1988, Lederman received the Nobel Prize for Physics along with Melvin Schwartz and Jack Steinberger "for the neutrino beam method and the demonstration of the doublet structure of the leptons through the discovery of the muon neutrino". Lederman also received the National Medal of Science (1965), the Elliott Cresson Medal for Physics (1976), the Wolf Prize for Physics (1982) and the Enrico Fermi Award (1992). In 1995, he received the Chicago History Museum "Making History Award" for Distinction in Science Medicine and Technology.

== Personal life and death ==
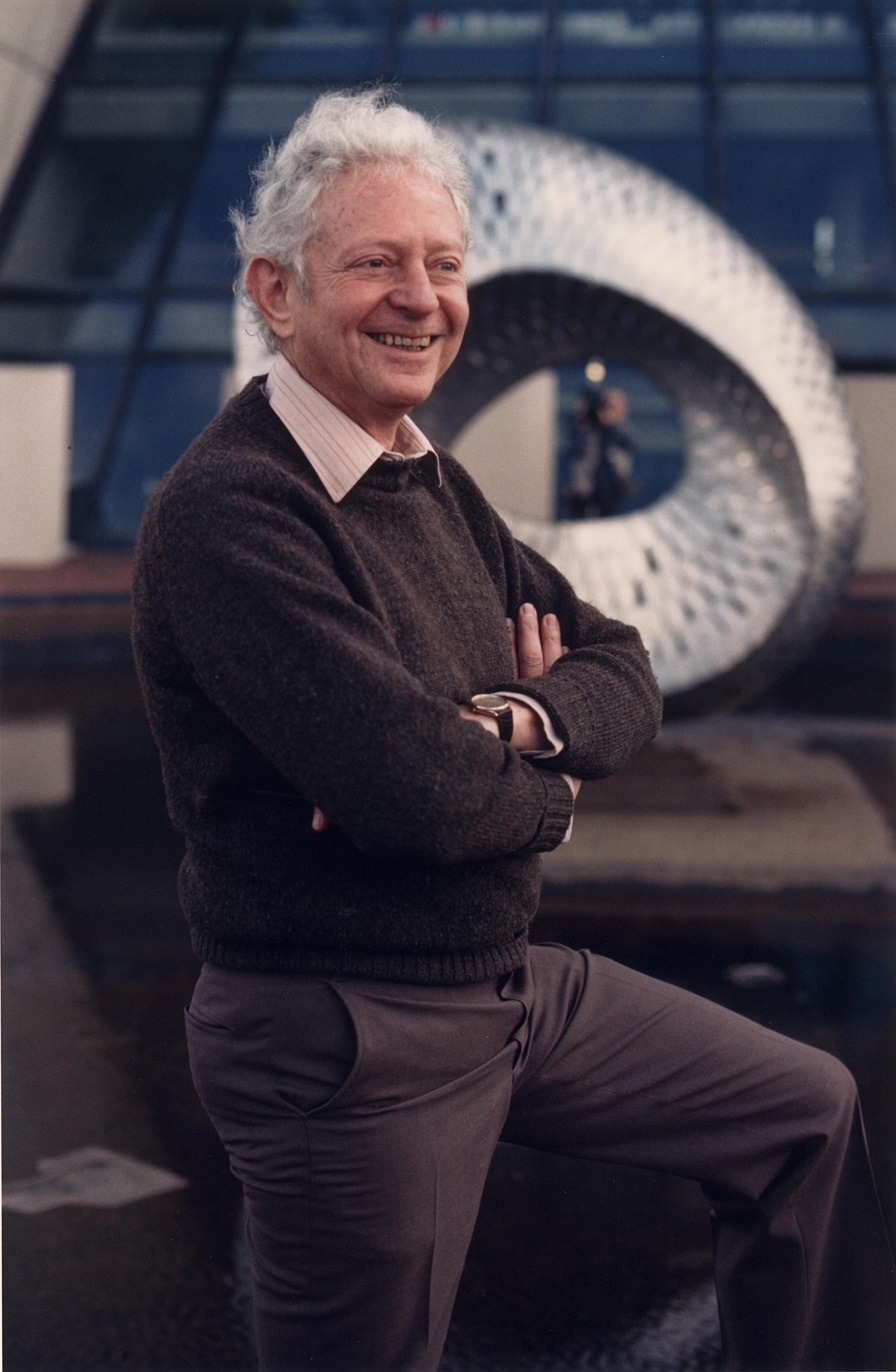
Lederman in May 2007

Lederman's best friend during his college years, Martin J. Klein, convinced him of "the splendors of physics during a long evening over many beers". Lederman was known in the physics community for his sense of humor. On August 26, 2008, he was video-recorded by a science focused organization called ScienCentral, on the street in New York City, answering questions from passersby. He answered questions such as "What is the strong force?" and "What happened before the Big Bang?".

He had three children with his first wife, Florence Gordon, and toward the end of his life lived with his second wife, Ellen (Carr), in Driggs, Idaho.

Lederman was an atheist. He began to suffer from memory loss in 2011. After struggling with medical bills, in 2015 he sold his Nobel Prize medal for $765,000 to pay them. He died of complications from dementia on October 3, 2018, at a care facility in Rexburg, Idaho, at age 96.

== Honors and awards ==
- Election to the National Academy of Sciences, 1965.
- National Medal of Science, 1965.
- Election to the American Academy of Arts and Sciences, 1970.
- Elliott Cresson Prize of the Franklin Institute, 1976.
- Wolf Prize in Physics, 1982.
- Golden Plate Award of the American Academy of Achievement, 1982.
- Nobel Prize in Physics, 1988.
- Election to the American Philosophical Society, 1989.
- Enrico Fermi Award of the United States Department of Energy, 1992.
- Appointment as a Tetelman Fellow at Jonathan Edwards College, 1994.
- Doctor of Humane Letters, DePaul University, 1995.
- Ordem Nacional do Merito Cientifico (Brazil), 1995.
- In Praise of Reason from the Committee for Skeptical Inquiry (CSICOP), 1996.
- Medallion, Division of Particles and Fields, Mexican Physical Society, 1999.
- AAAS Philip Hauge Abelson Prize, 2000
- Vannevar Bush Prize, 2012.
- Asteroid 85185 Lederman, discovered by Eric Walter Elst at La Silla Observatory in 1991, was named in his honor. The official naming citation was published by the Minor Planet Center on January 27, 2013 (M.P.C. 82401).

== Publications ==
- The God Particle: If the Universe Is the Answer, What Is the Question? by Leon M. Lederman, Dick Teresi (ISBN 0-385-31211-3)
- From Quarks to the Cosmos by Leon Lederman and David N. Schramm (ISBN 0-7167-6012-6)
- Portraits of Great American Scientists by Leon M. Lederman, et al. (ISBN 1-57392-932-8)
- Symmetry and the Beautiful Universe by Leon M. Lederman and Christopher T. Hill (ISBN 1-59102-242-8)
- "What We'll Find Inside the Atom" by Leon Lederman, an essay he wrote for Newsweek, September 15, 2008
- Quantum Physics for Poets by Leon M. Lederman and Christopher T. Hill (ISBN 978-1616142339)
- Beyond the God Particle by Leon M. Lederman and Christopher T. Hill (ISBN 978-1616148010)

== See also ==
- List of Jewish Nobel laureates
