= AMY (scientific instrument) =

The AMY detector was used by particle physicists at the TRISTAN electron-positron collider at KEK in Japan between 1984 and 1995 to search for new particles and perform precision studies of the strong and electroweak forces.

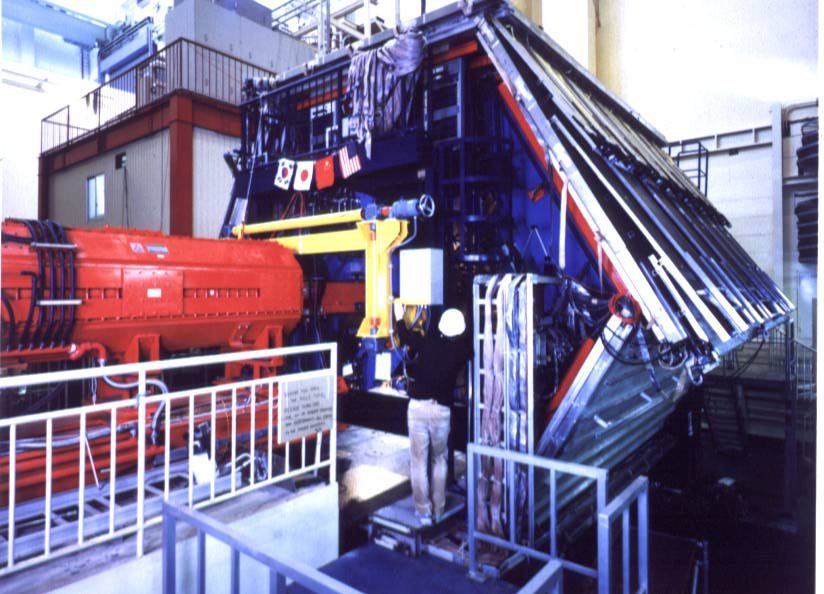
A photograph of the AMY detector

It was built and operated by physicists from many countries, including: the USA, Japan, South Korea, China, and the Philippines. For tracking charged particles, the detector contained an Inner Tracking Chamber and a Central Drift Chamber. A novel X-ray detector, sensitive to x-rays produced by electrons via synchrotron radiation in AMY's 3Tesla solenoidal magnet, was used for electron identification. The Barrel electromagnetic calorimeter was a sampling calorimeter using lead as its passive material and gas for sampling. AMY also had a muon detection system outside of the magnet return yoke.

Its most highly cited paper is "Multi - hadron event properties in e+e− annihilation at s√=52 GeV to 57-GeV"

While the names of most particle physics experiments are acronyms, AMY is just AMY.
