= KEK =

Japanese high-energy physics organization

Coordinates: 36°08′55″N 140°04′37″E

High Energy Accelerator Research Organization 高エネルギー加速器研究機構

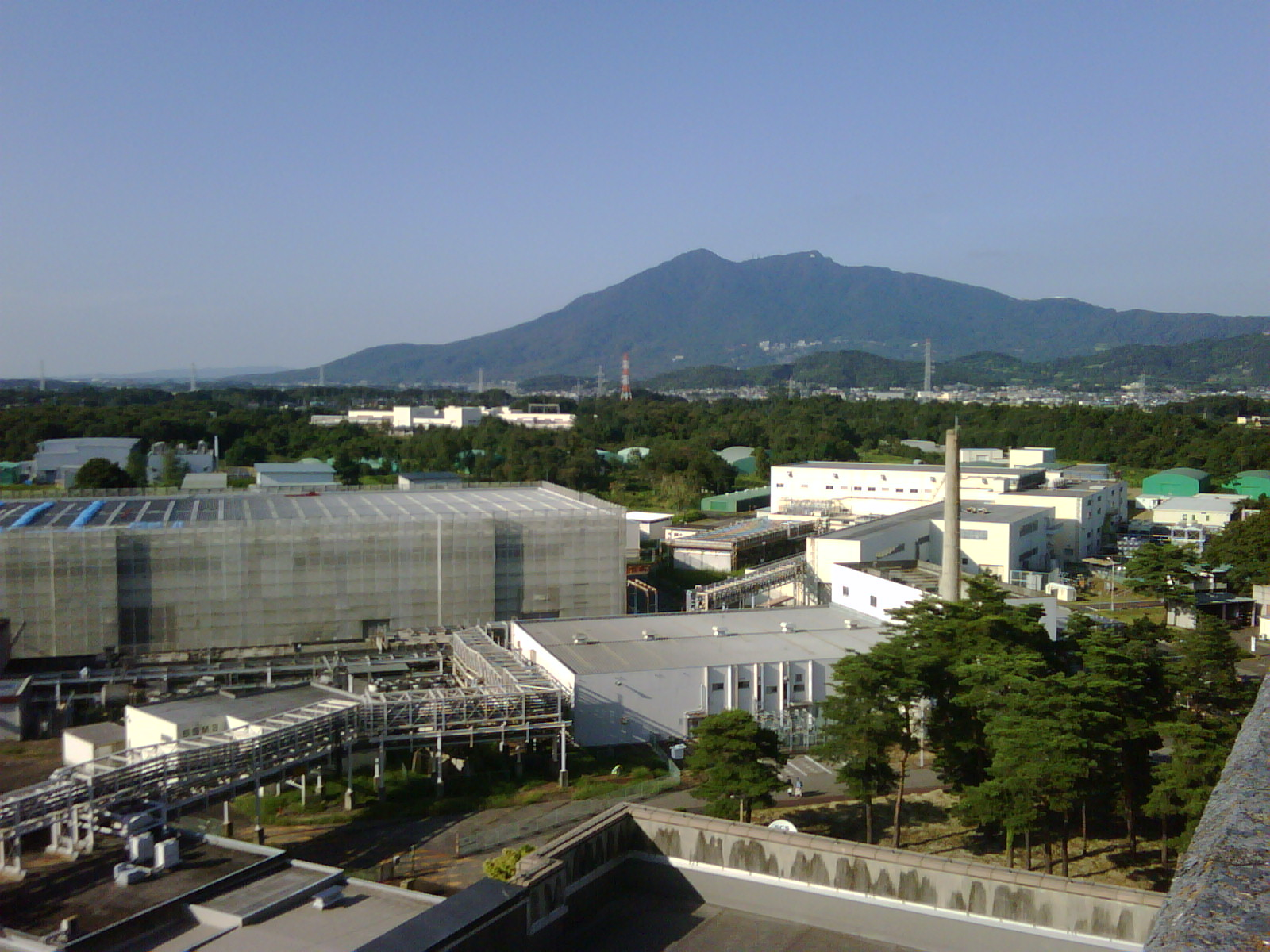
- Established: 1 April 1997
- Headquarters: Tsukuba, Ibaraki, Japan
- Director General: Masanori Yamauchi
- Affiliations: Ministry of Education, Culture, Sports, Science and Technology
- Website: http://www.kek.jp/en/

The High Energy Accelerator Research Organization (高エネルギー加速器研究機構, Kō Enerugī Kasokuki Kenkyū Kikō), known as KEK, is a Japanese organization whose purpose is to operate the largest particle physics laboratory in Japan, situated in Tsukuba, Ibaraki prefecture. It was established in 1997. The term "KEK" is also used to refer to the laboratory itself, which employs approximately 695 employees. KEK's main function is to provide the particle accelerators and other infrastructure needed for high-energy physics, material science, structural biology, radiation science, computing science, nuclear transmutation and so on. Numerous experiments have been constructed at KEK by the internal and international collaborations that have made use of them. Makoto Kobayashi, emeritus professor at KEK, is known globally for his work on CP-violation, and was awarded the 2008 Nobel Prize in Physics.

== History ==
KEK was established in 1997 in a reorganization of the Institute of Nuclear Study at the University of Tokyo (established in 1955), the National Laboratory for High Energy Physics (established in 1971), and the Meson Science Laboratory of the University of Tokyo (established in 1988). However, the reorganization was not a simple merge of the aforementioned laboratories. As such, KEK was not the only new institute created at that time, because not all of the work of the parent institutions fell under the umbrella of high energy physics; for example, the Center for Nuclear Study, the University of Tokyo, was concurrently established for low energy nuclear physics in a research partnership with RIKEN.

- 1971: National Laboratory for High Energy Physics (KEK) was established.
- 1976: The proton synchrotron (PS) produced an 8 GeV beam as designed. The PS achieved 12 GeV.
- 1978: The Booster Synchrotron Utilization Facility and a Photon Factory (PF) were founded.
- 1982: The PF succeeded in storing a 2.5 GeV electron beam.
- 1984: The Transposable Ring Intersecting Storage Accelerator in Nippon (TRISTAN) Accumulation Ring (AR) accelerated an electron beam to 6.5 GeV.
- 1985: The AR accelerated a positron beam to 5 GeV.
- 1986: The TRISTAN Main Ring (MR) accelerated both electron and positron beams to 25.5 GeV.
- 1988: The MR energy was upgraded to 30 GeV with the help of superconducting accelerating cavities.
- 1989: Accelerator and Synchrotron Radiation Science departments were established in the Graduate University for Advanced Studies.
- 1994: KEKB B-factory construction began.
- 1995: TRISTAN experiments (AMY, JADE, TOPAZ, VENUS) finished.
- 1997: The High Energy Accelerator Research Organization was established.
- 1998: First beam storage at KEKB (KEK B-factory) ring.
- 1999: The Long-baseline Neutrino Oscillation experiment (K2K) began. The Belle experiment at the KEKB began operation.
- 2001: Construction of High Intensity Proton Accelerators (J-PARC) started.
- 2004: Became the Inter-University Research Institute Corporation High Energy Accelerator Research Organization. K2K experiment ended.
- 2005: Tokai Campus was opened. Experiments at PS ended.
- 2006: J-PARC Center was established.
- 2008: Prof. Makoto Kobayashi won the 2008 Nobel Prize in Physics.
- 2009: J-PARC construction was completed.
- 2016: First turns and successful storage of beams in the SuperKEKB electron and positron rings
- 2017: Completed the 'rolling-in' of the Belle II experiment in Tsukuba, Japan.
- 2018: First collisions of SuperKEKB beams inside Belle II detector

== Organization ==
KEK has four main laboratories

- Accelerator Laboratory: Laboratory to study, develop, build and manage particle accelerators.
- Institute of Particle and Nuclear Studies: Pedestal physics laboratory to study elementary particle physics, nuclear physics and astrophysics.
- Institute of Materials Structure Science: Applied physics laboratory to study material structures.
- Applied Research Laboratory: Laboratory used to support research using particle accelerators.

Scientists in KEK conduct training for PhD course students of the School of High Energy Accelerator Science in the Graduate University for Advanced Studies.

== Location ==
- Tsukuba Campus: 1-1 Oho, Tsukuba, Ibaraki 305–0801, Japan
- Tokai Campus: 2-4 Shirane Shirakata, Tokai-mura, Naka-gun, Ibaraki 319–1195, Japan

== Particle accelerators ==
=== Current complex ===
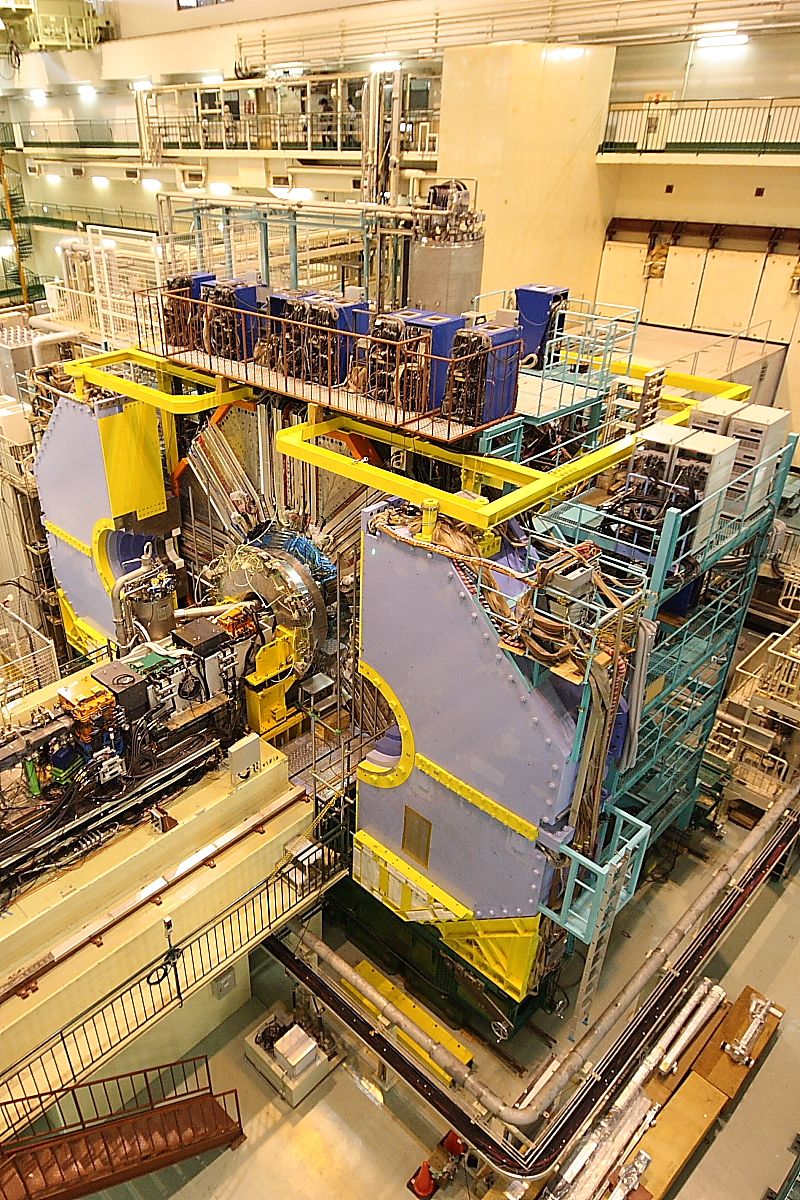
BELLE detector

- SuperKEKB: A electron-positron collider and upgrade to KEKB. With two storage rings: a 7 GeV electron storage ring and a 4 GeV positron storage ring. The circumferential length is about 3.016 km. Large quantities of B-mesons and anti-B-mesons will be generated providing data for the Belle II experiment.
- Photon Factory (PF): A electron storage ring is used for synchrotron light experiments. The circumferential length is about 187 m. The energy of the electron beam is 2.5 GeV.
- Photon Factory Advanced Ring (PF-AR): An electron storage ring is used for synchrotron light experiments. This accelerator generates high intensity and pulsed X-ray with the electron beam of 6.5 GeV. The circumferential length is about 377 m. This ring used to be operated as a booster synchrotron for TRISTAN, electron-positron collider, and called TRISTAN Accumulation Ring (AR) originally.

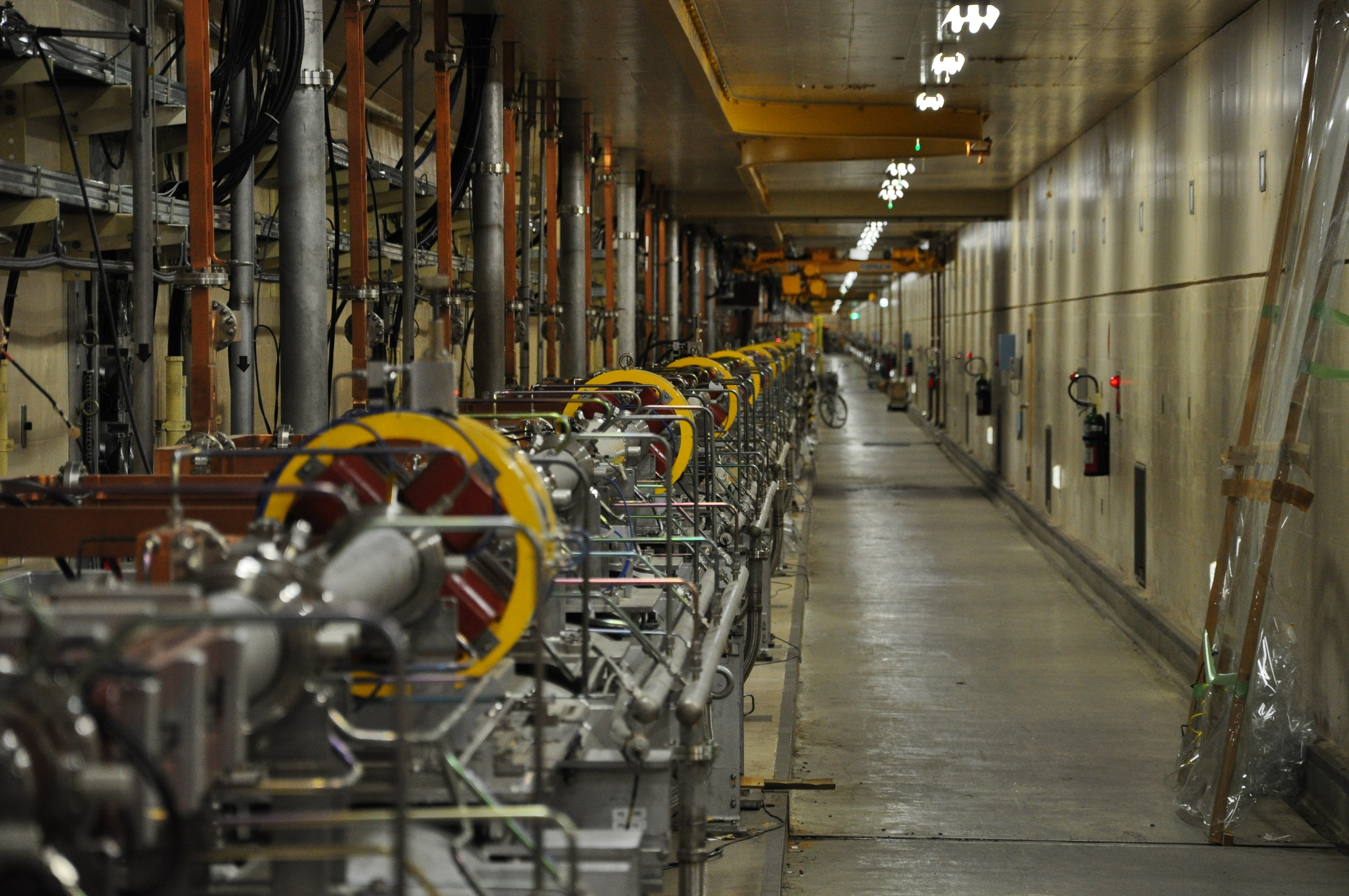
KEK e+/e- Linac

- KEK e+/e- Linac: A linear accelerator complex used to inject 8.0 GeV electrons and 3.5 GeV positrons to KEKB. The linac also provides 2.5 GeV electrons for PF and 6.5 GeV electrons for PF-AR. The Linac has in recent years been upgraded for SuperKEKB.
- Accelerator Test Facility (ATF): A test accelerator is focused on generating a super low-emittance beam. This is one of the essential techniques for realizing a future electron-positron linear collider. The beam energy of electrons is 1.28 GeV in normal operation.
- Superconducting RF Test Facility (STF): A test facility to build and operate a test linac with high-gradient superconducting cavities, as a prototype of the main linac systems for International Linear Collider (ILC).
- Japan Proton Accelerator Research Complex (J-PARC): A proton accelerator complex consisting primarily of a 600 MeV linac, a 3 GeV synchrotron and 50 GeV synchrotron. J-PARC was built with a collaboration between KEK and JAEA, and is used for nuclear physics, particle physics, muon science, neutron science, Accelerator-Driven System (ADS) and a range of other applications.
- KEK digital accelerator (KEK-DA) is a renovation of the KEK 500 MeV booster proton synchrotron, which was shut down in 2006. The existing 40 MeV drift tube linac and rf cavities have been replaced by an electron cyclotron resonance (ECR) ion source embedded in a 200 kV high-voltage terminal and induction acceleration cells, respectively. A DA is, in principle, capable of accelerating any species of ion in all possible charge states.

=== Shutdown complex ===
- Proton Synchrotron (PS): An accelerator complex to accelerate protons up to 12 GeV. PS had consisted primarily of a 750 keV pre-accelerator, a 40 MeV linac, a 500 MeV booster synchrotron and a 12 GeV main ring. PS had been used for nuclear and particle physics. PS also had provided the 12 GeV proton beam to a neutrino beam line in KEK for a KEK to Kamioka (K2K) experiment. PS achieved its design energy of 8 GeV in 1976. PS was shut down in 2007.
- Neutrino Beam Line: A beam line to drive neutrinos into Super-Kamiokande, which is about 250 km away from KEK, and a neutrino oscillation experiment named K2K had been conducted from 1999 to 2004. A neutrino oscillation experiment named Tokai to Kamioka (T2K) has been conducted using J-PARC since 2009.
- Transposable Ring Intersecting Storage Accelerator in Nippon (TRISTAN): An electron-positron collider had been operated from 1987 to 1995. The main purpose was detecting top quark. The electron and positron energy were 30 GeV. TRISTAN had three detectors: TOPAZ, VENUS and AMY. KEKB was built through the use of the tunnel of TRISTAN.

=== Running and future plans ===
- SuperKEKB: An electron-positron collider, consisting of a 7 GeV electron storage ring and a 4 GeV positron storage ring, to achieve higher luminosity by means of increasing the beam current, focusing the beams at the interaction point and making the electromagnetic beam-beam interactions small. The target luminosity has been set to 8×10^{35} cm^{−2} s^{−1}, about 60 times higher than the KEKB's original design value. SuperKEKB has adopted a nano-beam scheme. KEK will build a new damping ring in order to generate the nano scale positron beam. On October, 2010 the Japanese government formally approved the SuperKEKB project, and in June 2010 an initial budget of 100 million dollars (¥100 = $1) for a Very Advanced Research Support Program was assigned for 2010–2012. The total budget is about 315 million dollars (¥100 = $1) by the program. The upgrade will be completed, and the first collisions have been conducted in 2018. The highest luminosity will be achieved in 2021. Belle II experiment will be conducted using SuperKEKB.
- Compact Energy Recovery Linac (cERL): A test accelerator for a future synchrotron light source named Energy Recovery Linac (ERL). cERL will study the uncertainty of the accelerator physics in the ERL through the beam experiments. The beam commissioning in cERL will be scheduled from 2013 with a 35 MeV electron beam. KEK has a plan that will build 5 GeV ERL, provides ultra-high brightness and ultra-short pulsed synchrotron light, after the cERL experiments.
- International Linear Collider (ILC): A future electron-positron linear collider consisting of superconducting cavities with a length of approximately 31 kilometers in length and two damping rings, for electrons and positrons, with a circumference of 6.7 kilometers. The electron and positron energy will be up to 500 GeV with an option to upgrade to 1 TeV. Nearly 300 laboratories and universities around the world are involved in the ILC: more than 700 people are working on the accelerator design, and another 900 people on detector development. The accelerator design work is coordinated by the Global Design Effort, and the physics and detector work by the World Wide Study.

== Computers ==
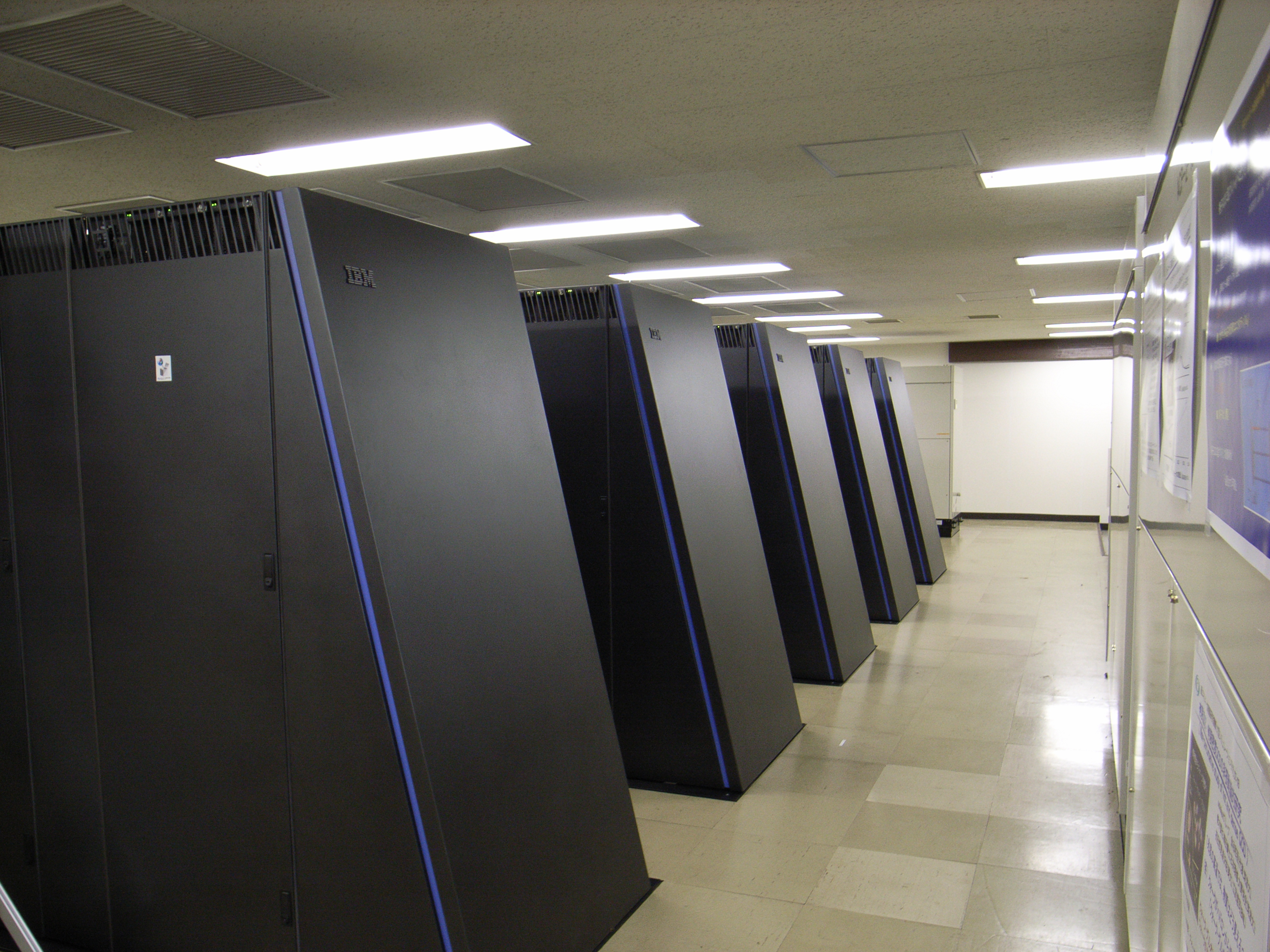
Blue Gene

KEK has computers which are fastest class in Japan, and Computing Research Center in KEK manages the computer systems. The theoretical operation performance of SR16000, a super computer made by Hitachi, is 46 TFLOPS. The theoretical operation performance of Blue Gene Solution, a super computer made by IBM, is 57.3 TFLOPS. These super computers had been used to study quantum chromodynamics and numerical accelerator physics mainly, and these super computers have been shut down in order to introduce a next super computer in the future. Computing Research Center also manages the other computer systems: KEKCC, B-factory Computer System and Synchrotron Light Computer System.

KEK hosted the first web site in Japan on September 30, 1992. The original web site can still be seen.

== See also ==
- SuperKEKB
- Belle II experiment
- KEKB (accelerator)
- Belle experiment
- Makoto Kobayashi (physicist)
- J-PARC
- Super-Kamiokande
- International Linear Collider
- CERN
- Fermilab
- DESY
- SLAC National Accelerator Laboratory
- Brookhaven National Laboratory
- AMY experiment
