= Upsilon meson =

Subatomic particle

Upsilon
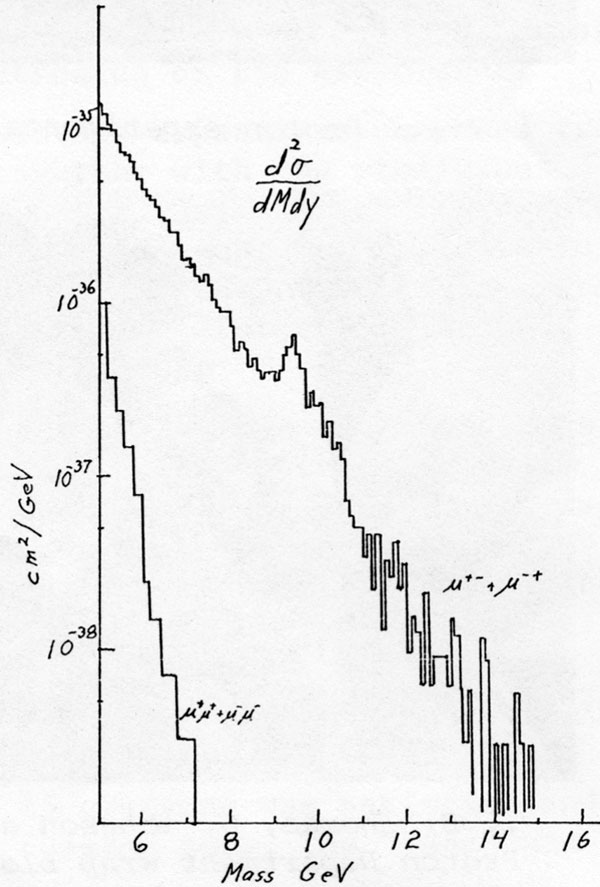
- A plot of the invariant mass of muon pairs, from the Upsilon particle discovery paper. The peak at about 9.5 GeV/c^{2} is due to the contribution of the Upsilon meson.
- Composition: bb̅
- Statistics: Bosonic
- Family: Mesons
- Interactions: Strong, weak, electromagnetic, gravity
- Symbol: ϒ
- Antiparticle: Self
- Discovered: E288 experiment (1977)
- Types: 1
- Mass: 9.46030(26) GeV/c^{2}
- Mean lifetime: 1.21×10^{−20} s
- Electric charge: 0 e
- Spin: 1 ħ
- Isospin: 0
- Hypercharge: 0
- Parity: −1
- C parity: −1

The Upsilon meson (ϒ) is a quarkonium state (i.e. flavourless meson) formed from a bottom quark and its antiparticle.

It was discovered by the E288 experiment team, headed by Leon Lederman, at Fermilab in 1977. It has a lifetime of 1.21×10^{−20} s and a mass about 9.46 GeV/c^{2} in the ground state.

== Overview ==
Quark structure of the Upsilon meson

There are many species of bottomonium known, but the ones generated by e^{−}e^{+} colliding beams (or proton–nucleus collisions decaying to μ^{+}μ^{−} + X) are the ones generally referred to as upsilon mesons.

Thus, among the bound bb̅ bottomonium species, the S-state (Note: The S-state is orbital angular momentum L = 0.) triplet (Note: With total spin S = 1, the multiplicity 2S + 1 = 3, i.e., a triplet.) resonances are identified as upsilons, and are assigned the shorthand notations ϒ(S1), ϒ(S2), ϒ(S3), etc., (Note: Or Upsilon (S1), written out.) where the numbers 1, 2, 3 represent the principal quantum number n. (Note: "the upsilon (1S).. upsilon (4S) can be identified with the spin triplet S-wave bound states of the bb̅ system".) (Note: Sudaresan explains in terms of the standard spectral notation (term symbol) expressed as ^{2S+1}L_{J}, where S is total spin, 2S + 1 the multiplicity 3 (triplet), the orbital angular momentum L = 0 represented as "S" for S-state, and J the total angular momentum quantum number 1.)

Alternatively, the notation parenthesizing the measured mass in MeV/c^{2} is used, e.g. ϒ(10860). In the narrow sense, "Upsilon particle" refers strictly to the ϒ(1S). (Note: As in the case with upsilon, upsilon prime, etc., above.)

As clear from its quark structure, the Upsilon meson carries no charge or flavor, and has 0 isospin.

The zero spin state should have a lighter mass by about 0.1% to 1% according to quantum chromodynamics.

== Discovery ==
Lederman's E288 experiment team at Fermilab had made a preliminary finding of a resonance at 9.5 GeV/c^{2} in November 1976, but was more reticent in announcing it because earlier they had prematurely announced a 6 GeV/c^{2} resonance event (which they were planning to name upsilon; cf. Oops-Leon) with their equipment in dielectron (e^{+}e^{−}) mode; this find did not pan out and ultimately could not be confirmed. However, with their equipment converted to dimuon (μ^{−}μ^{+}) mode with increased sensitivity upped 100 times, they began measurement in May 1977 and clearly confirmed resonance peaks at 9.4/9.5. 10. 10.4 GeV/c^{2} (cf. § Resonance states under S1, S2, S3) (Note: They referred to the 3 peaks at the time by the shorthand ϒ, ϒ (upsilon prime), and ϒ (upsilon double prime).) These peaks were verified by the German team using DESY's DORIS storage ring.

The upsilon was the first particle containing a bottom quark to be discovered because it is the lightest that can be produced without additional massive particles. (Note: Also, the Lederman team concentrated on lepton beam experiments (dielectron or dimuon decay), even reconfirming the J/ψ found at SLAC. Other teams preferred to do hadron beams at the time "the techiques needed to do experiments with hadron beams simply didn't exist", recalled Fermilab physicist Joseph Lach.)

== Resonant states ==
=== ϒ(1S) ===
Mass measured at 9460.30±0.26 MeV/c^{2} (Lawrence Berkeley National Laboratory, Particle Data Group, 2008)

Lifeime of about > 10^{−20} (Note: Longer than J/ψ.) calculated from measured energy width to 1.21×10^{−20} s. (Note: As reiterated below, the lifetime is determined by dividing the h/2π = ħ = 6.582119568×10^{−16} eV⋅Hz^{−1} by the measured energy width "54.02±1.25 keV" value (published by the Particle Data Group).) (Note: Other sources publish 1.21×10^{−20}, e.g. Warren & Baugher (2017), though that data refers more specifically to muon pair decay.)

The types of decay modes are diverse, with electron pair, muon pair, tauon pair decays (all three lepton decays) each occurring at 2.5% frequency.

The short lifetime (τ) is calculable from the usual formula τ ΔE = ħ, so in the subsequent sections, the listing of the lifetimes will be eschewed.

=== ϒ(2S) ===
Mass measured at 10.02326±0.00031 GeV/c^{2}.

Here again, decay modes are diverse, decaying into ϒ(1S) and charged pion pair, approx. 20% of the time, into ϒ(1S) and neutral π pair, approx. 10%, and into lepton (e, μ, τ) pairs, about 2% each.

A B-factory at SLAC's PEP-II accelerator postponed the termination of operation by 2 months to conduct experiments starting February 2008 to generate ϒ(2S) and ϒ(3S) (cf. below). While the data remained to be fully analyzed, the team announced in the fall of 2008 that they discovered the spin 0 ground state bottomonium corresponding to the spin 1 ϒ(1S) state. The published mass difference with ϒ(1S) was 71.4+2.3
−3.1 ± 2.7 MeV/c^{2}.

=== ϒ(3S) ===
Mass measured at 10.3552±0.0005 GeV/c^{2}

Again, diversely decaying into Υ(2S) + X (such as pion pairs), approx. 10% Υ(1S) + X (such as pion pairs), also lepton (μ, τ) pairs, about 2% apiece, but e^{+}e^{^} decay is quite rare.

=== ϒ(4S) ===
Also called ϒ(10580) 10.5794±0.0012 GeV/c^{2}。

Nearly completely decays (> 96%) into B meson pairs, almost fifty–fifty between charged pairs and uncharged pairs.

Thus for B meson research, this ϒ(4S) mode of resonance is of great importance, and its research has been undertaken by various B-factories (up to c. 1999).。

=== ϒ(10860) ===
Also called Y(5S). Measured mass of 10.865±0.008 GeV/c^{2}

Main decay mode into B meson pairs only or with 1 or 2 pions, about 60% of the time, and into charm B meson pairs, about 20% of the time.

In this 2008 data report, the strange B meson (B_{s}) decay is also tentatively reported. (Note: With asterisk (*).) The energy threshold was also met by Japan's KEKB accelerator whose Belle B factory experiment also contemplated the strange B meson decay. The successes of Y(4S) research has led to the advent of studying Y(5S) at the higher luminosities From around 2008.

=== ϒ(11020) ===
Mass measured at 11.019±0.008 GeV/c^{2}.

The decay modes are unclear except a small percentage of electron pair decays, as of 2008.。

== See also ==
- Oops-Leon, an erroneously-claimed discovery of a similar particle at a lower mass in 1976.
- The ϕ particle is the analogous state made from strange quarks.
- The J/ψ particle is the analogous state made from charm quarks.
- List of mesons
