= Luminosity (scattering theory) =

Number of particles per unit area per unit time times the opacity of the target

In scattering theory and accelerator physics, luminosity (L) is the ratio of the number of events detected (dN) in a certain period of time (dt) to the cross-section (σ):

$$L = \frac{1}{\sigma}\frac{dN}{dt}.$$

It has the dimensions of events on time on area, and is usually expressed in the cgs units of cm^{−2}·s^{−1} or the non-SI units of b^{−1}·s^{−1}. In practice, L is dependent on the particle beam parameters, such as beam width and particle flow rate, as well as the target properties, such as target size and density.

A related quantity is integrated luminosity (L_{int}), which is the integral of the luminosity with respect to time:

$$L_\mathrm{int} = \int L \ dt.$$

The luminosity and integrated luminosity are useful values to characterize the performance of a particle accelerator. In particular, all collider experiments aim to maximize their integrated luminosities, as the higher the integrated luminosity, the more data is available to analyze.

== Examples of collider luminosity ==
Here are a few examples of the luminosity of certain accelerators.

Collider	Interaction	L (cm^{−2}·s^{−1})
SPS	p + p̅	6.0×10^{30}
Tevatron	p + p̅	4.0×10^{32}
HERA	p + e^{+}	4.0×10^{31}
LEP	e^{−} + e^{+}	1.0×10^{32}
PEP	e^{−} + e^{+}	3.0×10^{33}
KEKB	e^{−} + e^{+}	2.1×10^{34}
SuperKEKB	e^{−} + e^{+}	5.1×10^{34}
LHC	p + p	2.1×10^{34}
LHC	p + Pb	8.5×10^{29}
LHC	Pb + Pb	6.1×10^{27}
HL-LHC	p + p	5.0×10^{34}
