= George Trilling =

Polish-American particle physicist (1930–2020)

George Henry Trilling
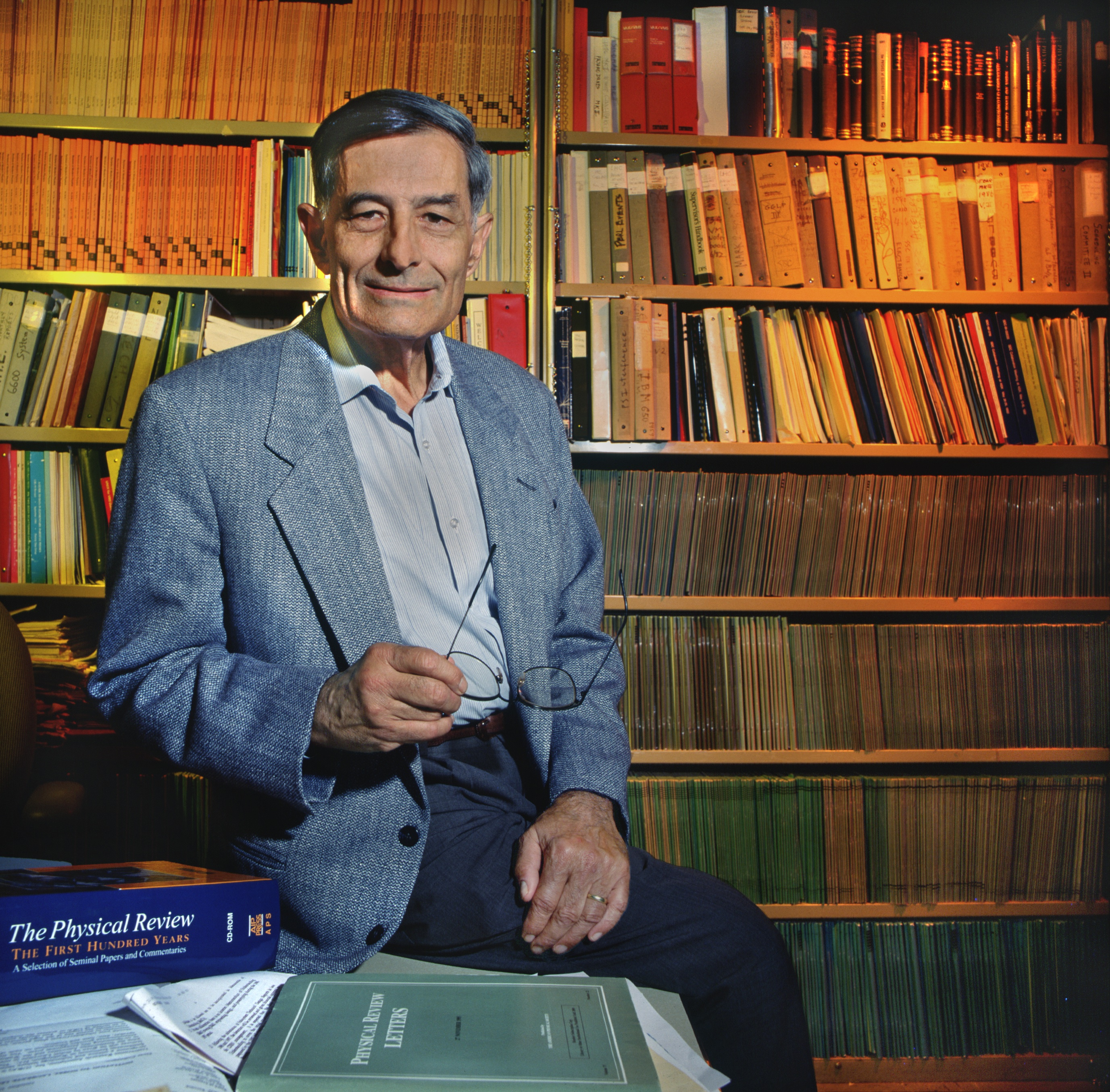
- Born: September 18, 1930; Bialystok, Poland
- Died: April 30, 2020 (aged 89); Berkeley, California
- Education: California Institute of Technology
- Scientific career
- Fields: Particle physics
- Workplaces: École Polytechnique; University of Michigan; University of California, Berkeley; Lawrence Berkeley National Laboratory
- Thesis: A cloud-chamber investigation of charged V particles (1955)
- Doctoral advisor: Carl D. Anderson

George H. Trilling (18 September 1930 – 30 April 2020) was an American particle physicist. He was co-discoverer of the J/ψ meson which evinced the existence of the charm quark. Trilling joined the Physics Department faculty at the University of California, Berkeley, in 1960, where he was department chair from 1968 through 1972. Trilling was on sabbatical leave to CERN in 1973–74, where he worked on the study of the properties of charm particles, their decay modes and excited states. He was also director of the Physics Division at the Lawrence Berkeley National Laboratory from 1984 until 1987. Trilling was a principal proponent of the Superconducting Super Collider project and spokesperson for the Solenoidal Detector Collaboration. After the SSC was cancelled in 1993, Trilling transitioned most of the SDC team to collaborate on the ATLAS experiment at the LHC, which led to the discovery of the Higgs boson in 2012. He was elected vice-president of the American Physical Society, beginning his term on 1 January 1999, and was president of the society in 2001.

== Early life and education ==
George was born in Bialystok, Poland, and his family emigrated to France a few months later, where they lived primarily in Nice. In 1940, World War II forced the family to emigrate again, eventually settling in Pasadena, California. He earned his B.S. in electrical engineering in 1951, and his Ph.D. in physics in 1955, both from Caltech. He did one year of postdoctoral studies at Caltech and then studied in France on a Fulbright Fellowship with Louis Leprince-Ringuet.

== Career ==
Already as an undergraduate at Caltech, Trilling worked in the laboratory of Carl Anderson, where cosmic rays were observed using cloud chambers. As a graduate student at Caltech, Trilling excelled in Prof. William Smythe's famous course in classical electrodynamics and was named by Smythe as the best student ever to take the course over the many years he taught it. In his thesis work, done in connection with Robert Leighton, Trilling studied "strange" particles, whose name reflected their surprisingly long lifetimes, on the scale of nanoseconds, much more than a trillion times longer than would have been expected. Among these were the strange mesons – kaons – and strange baryonic states including the Lambda. The true nature of the strange particles became clear only with the development of the quark model, which initially had just three quarks, the third being the strange quark.

In 1957, Trilling joined the physics faculty at the University of Michigan, where he was a member of the group headed by Professor Donald A. Glaser, inventor of the bubble chamber, the device that supplanted the cloud chamber. In 1959, Glaser moved to University of California, Berkeley, and recruited Trilling to join him there as a tenured associate professor in 1960. When Glaser changed his research focus to biophysics in 1962, Trilling assumed leadership of the group. In 1963, Trilling joined forces with Gerson Goldhaber to form the Trilling–Goldhaber Group. Using bubble chambers, the Trilling–Goldhaber group investigated processes that produced resonant states, which decayed rapidly and whose presence could be inferred only by reconstructing the resonances from their decay products. Among the effects observed was interference between two states – the neutral rho meson and the omega meson – which was possible only through the small violation of isospin invariance.

In 1972, Trilling and Goldhaber, together with Willi Chinowski, also of the Berkeley Physics Department, joined Burton Richter and Martin Perl at Stanford in forming the Mark I (detector) collaboration to measure electron–positron collisions at SLAC's Stanford Positron Electron Accelerating Ring, SPEAR. Trilling contributed the tracking code that analyzed the outgoing particles from the electron–positron annihilation. The SLAC-LBL team at SPEAR discovered the J/ψ meson, its recurrence ψ', charm particles and the tau lepton.

The Mark I detector was upgraded to Mark II and the energy of the storage ring was increased to a center-of-mass energy of 27 GeV, making possible the study of particles containing the b quark. Trilling played a key role in measuring the life-time of B mesons, which turned out to be surprisingly long. This feature made possible the subsequent measurements of CP violation in asymmetric electron-positron colliders.

The Mark II detector was subsequently used at the Stanford Linear Collider (SLC), whose energy was designed for the production of the Z boson.

Following work at SLC, Trilling joined a team designing a detector for the Superconducting Supercollider and became spokesperson for the Solenoidal Detector Collaboration (SDC). When the SSC project was terminated in 1993, Trilling became a leader in the American effort to join the analogous program at CERN, the Large Hadron Collider. As a member of the ATLAS collaboration, Trilling was part of one of the two teams that announced the discovery of the Higgs boson on July 4, 2012.

== Professional positions ==
Trilling was chair of the Physics Department at Berkeley from 1968 to 1972, and director of the LBNL Physics Division from 1984 to 1987. He was a fellow of the American Physical Society, served as its president in 2001, and elected to the National Academy of Sciences in 1983 and the American Academy of Arts and Sciences in 1993.

== Fields of study ==
Trilling's early research focused on strange particles, especially K mesons. Using bubble chambers, he later studied quasi-two-body processes. At SLAC he was a leader of experiments measuring electron–positron annihilation. In the last stage of his career it was very high energy proton–proton collisions that were his focus.
