= ATLAS experiment =

CERN LHC experiment

Coordinates: 46°14′8″N 6°3′19″E

Large Hadron Collider (LHC)
- Plan of the LHC experiments and the preaccelerators.

LHC experiments
- ATLAS: A Toroidal LHC Apparatus
- CMS: Compact Muon Solenoid
- LHCb: LHC-beauty
- ALICE: A Large Ion Collider Experiment
- TOTEM: Total Cross Section, Elastic Scattering and Diffraction Dissociation
- LHCf: LHC-forward
- MoEDAL: Monopole and Exotics Detector At the LHC
- FASER: ForwArd Search ExpeRiment
- SND: Scattering and Neutrino Detector

LHC preaccelerators
- p and Pb: Linear accelerators for protons (Linac 4) and lead (Linac 3)
- (not marked): Proton Synchrotron Booster
- PS: Proton Synchrotron
- SPS: Super Proton Synchrotron

ATLAS is the largest general-purpose particle detector experiment at the Large Hadron Collider (LHC), a particle accelerator at CERN (the European Organization for Nuclear Research) in Switzerland. The experiment is designed to take advantage of the unprecedented energy available at the LHC and observe phenomena that involve highly massive particles which were not observable using earlier lower-energy accelerators. ATLAS was one of the two LHC experiments involved in the discovery of the Higgs boson in July 2012. It was also designed to search for evidence of theories of particle physics beyond the Standard Model.

The experiment is a collaboration involving 6,003 members, out of which 3,822 are physicists (last update: June 26, 2022) from 243 institutions in 40 countries.

== History ==
=== Particle accelerator growth ===
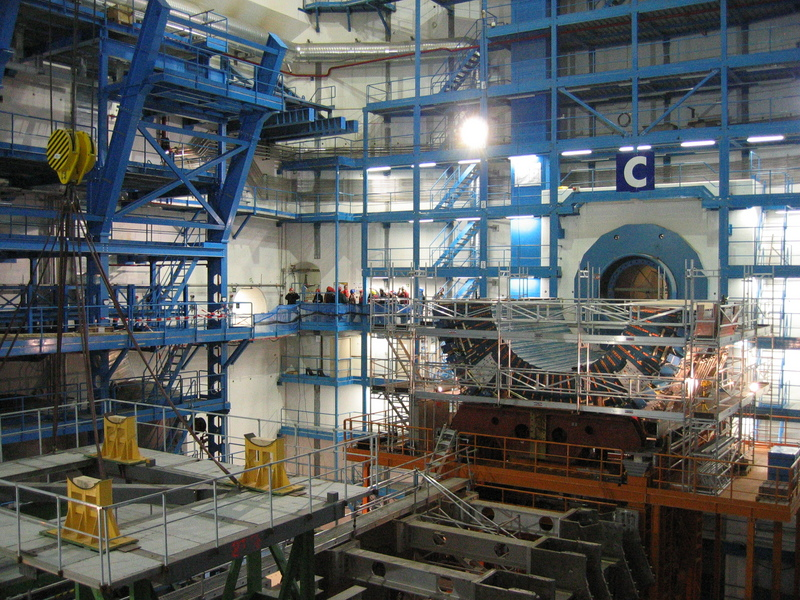
ATLAS detector under construction in October 2004 in the experiment pit. Construction was completed in 2008 and ATLAS has been successfully collecting data since November 2009, when colliding beam operation at the LHC started. Note the people in the background, for size comparison.

The first cyclotron, an early type of particle accelerator, was built by Ernest O. Lawrence in 1931, with a radius of just a few centimetres and a particle energy of 1 megaelectronvolt (MeV). Since then, accelerators have grown enormously in the quest to produce new particles of greater and greater mass. As accelerators have grown, so too has the list of known particles that they might be used to investigate.

=== ATLAS Collaboration ===
The ATLAS Collaboration, the international group of physicists belonging to different universities and research centres who built and run the detector, was formed in 1992 when the proposed EAGLE (Experiment for Accurate Gamma, Lepton and Energy Measurements) and ASCOT (Apparatus with Super Conducting Toroids) collaborations merged their efforts to build a single, general-purpose particle detector for a new particle accelerator, the Large Hadron Collider. At present, the ATLAS Collaboration involves 6,003 members, out of which 3,822 are physicists (last update: June 26, 2022) from 257 institutions in 42 countries.

=== Detector design and construction ===
The design was a combination of two previous projects for LHC, EAGLE and ASCOT, and also benefitted from the detector research and development that had been done for the Superconducting Super Collider, a US project interrupted in 1993. The ATLAS experiment was proposed in its current form in 1994, and officially funded by the CERN member countries in 1995. Additional countries, universities, and laboratories have joined in subsequent years. Construction work began at individual institutions, with detector components then being shipped to CERN and assembled in the ATLAS experiment pit starting in 2003.

=== Detector operation ===
Construction was completed in 2008 and the experiment detected its first single proton beam events on 10 September of that year. Data-taking was then interrupted for over a year due to an LHC magnet quench incident. On 23 November 2009, the first proton–proton collisions occurred at the LHC and were recorded by ATLAS, at a relatively low injection energy of 900 GeV in the center of mass of the collision. Since then, the LHC energy has been increasing: 1.8 TeV at the end of 2009, 7 TeV for the whole of 2010 and 2011, then 8 TeV in 2012. The first data-taking period performed between 2010 and 2012 is referred to as Run I. After a long shutdown (LS1) in 2013 and 2014, in 2015 ATLAS saw 13 TeV collisions. The second data-taking period, Run II, was completed, always at 13 TeV energy, at the end of 2018 with a recorded integrated luminosity of nearly 140 fb^{−1} (inverse femtobarn). A second long shutdown (LS2) in 2019–22 with upgrades to the ATLAS detector was followed by Run III, which started in July 2022.

Periods of LHC	Operation
Apr 2010 – Jan 2013	Run I
Feb 2013 – Jan 2015	LS1
Feb 2015 – Nov 2018	Run II
Dec 2018 – Jun 2022	LS2
Jul 2022 – Jun 2026	Run III

=== Leadership ===
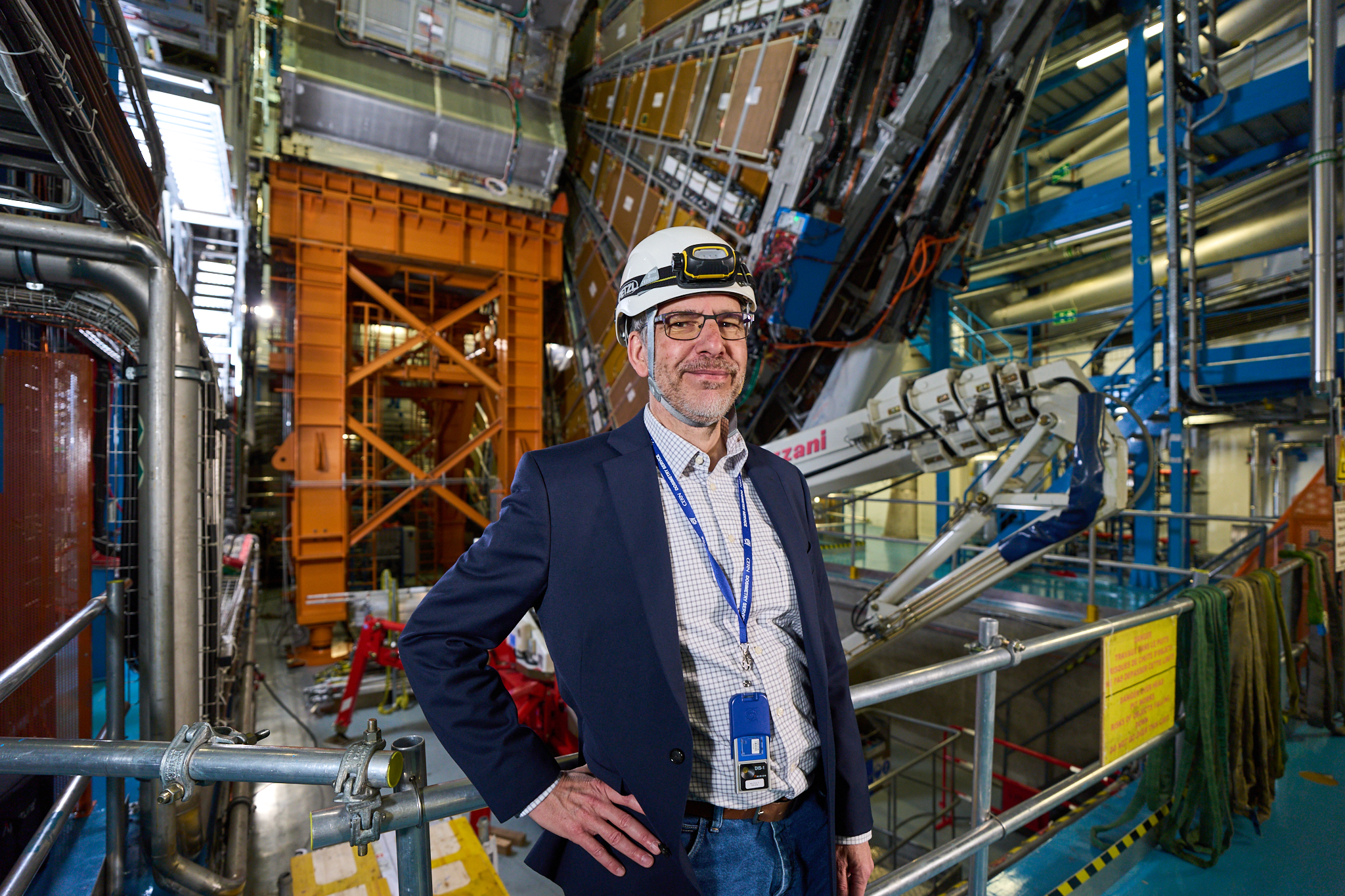
Stéphane Willocq, ATLAS spokesperson (2025 - Present).

The ATLAS Collaboration is currently led by Spokesperson Stephane Willocq and Deputy Spokespersons Anna Sfyrla and Guillaume Unal. Former Spokespersons have been:

Friedrich Dydak and Peter Jenni	(1992 – 1995)
Peter Jenni	(1995 – 2009)
Fabiola Gianotti	(2009 – 2013)
David Charlton	(2013 – 2017)
Karl Jakobs	(2017 – 2021)
Andreas Hoecker	(2021 - 2025)
Stephane Willocq	(2025 – Present)

== Experimental program ==
In the field of particle physics, ATLAS studies different types of processes detected or detectable in energetic collisions at the Large Hadron Collider (LHC). For the processes already known, it is a matter of measuring more and more accurately the properties of known particles or finding quantitative confirmations of the Standard Model. Processes not observed so far would allow, if detected, to discover new particles or to have confirmation of physical theories that go beyond the Standard Model.

=== Standard Model ===
The Standard Model of particle physics is the theory describing three of the four known fundamental forces (the electromagnetic, weak, and strong interactions, while omitting gravity) in the universe, as well as classifying all known elementary particles. It was developed in stages throughout the latter half of the 20th century, through the work of many scientists around the world, with the current formulation being finalized in the mid-1970s upon experimental confirmation of the existence of quarks. Since then, confirmation of the top quark (1995), the tau neutrino (2000), and the Higgs boson (2012) have added further credence to the Standard Model. In addition, the Standard Model has predicted various properties of weak neutral currents and the W and Z bosons with great accuracy.

Although the Standard Model is believed to be theoretically self-consistent and has demonstrated huge successes in providing experimental predictions, it leaves some phenomena unexplained and falls short of being a complete theory of fundamental interactions. It does not fully explain baryon asymmetry, incorporate the full theory of gravitation as described by general relativity, or account for the accelerating expansion of the universe as possibly described by dark energy. The model does not contain any viable dark matter particle that possesses all of the required properties deduced from observational cosmology. It also does not incorporate neutrino oscillations and their non-zero masses.

==== Precision measurements ====
With the important exception of the Higgs boson, detected by the ATLAS and the CMS experiments in 2012, all of the particles predicted by the Standard Model had been observed by previous experiments. In this field, in addition to the discovery of the Higgs boson, the experimental work of ATLAS has focused on precision measurements, aimed at determining with ever greater accuracy the many physical parameters of theory. In particular for

- the Higgs boson;
- W and Z bosons;
- the top and bottom quarks

ATLAS measures:

- masses;
- channels of production, decay and mean lifetimes;
- interaction mechanisms and coupling constants for electroweak and strong interactions.

For example, the data collected by ATLAS made it possible in 2018 to measure the mass [(80,370±19) MeV] of the W boson, one of the two mediators of the weak interaction, with a measurement uncertainty of ±2.4‰.

==== Higgs boson ====
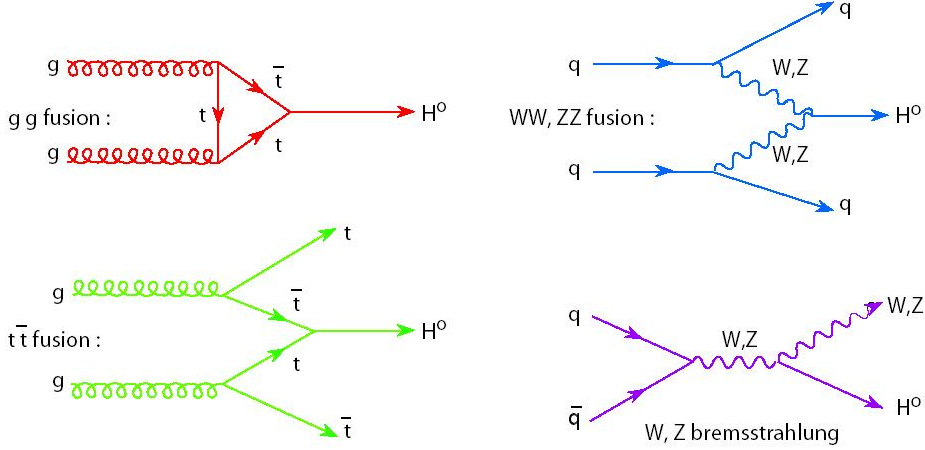
Schematics, called Feynman diagrams show the main ways that the Standard Model Higgs boson can be produced from colliding protons at the LHC.

One of the most important goals of ATLAS was to investigate a missing piece of the Standard Model, the Higgs boson. The Higgs mechanism, which includes the Higgs boson, gives mass to elementary particles, leading to differences between the weak force and electromagnetism by giving the W and Z bosons mass while leaving the photon massless.

On July 4, 2012, ATLAS — together with CMS, its sister experiment at the LHC — reported evidence for the existence of a particle consistent with the Higgs boson at a confidence level of 5 sigma, with a mass around 125 GeV, or 133 times the proton mass. This new "Higgs-like" particle was detected by its decay into two photons ($H\rightarrow\gamma\gamma$) and its decay to four leptons ($H\rightarrow ZZ^*\rightarrow 4l$ and $H\rightarrow WW^*\rightarrow e\nu\mu\nu$).

In March 2013, following the updated results from ATLAS and CMS, CERN announced that the newly discovered particle was indeed a Higgs boson. The experiments were also able to show that the properties of the particle as well as the ways it interacts with other particles were well-matched with those of a Higgs boson, which is expected to have spin 0 and positive parity. Analysis of more properties of the particle and data collected in 2015 and 2016 confirmed this further.

In October 2013, two of the theoretical physicists who predicted the existence of the Standard Model Higgs boson, Peter Higgs and François Englert, were awarded the Nobel Prize in Physics.

==== Top quark properties ====
The properties of the top quark, discovered at Fermilab in 1995, had been measured approximately. With much greater energy and greater collision rates, the LHC produces a tremendous number of top quarks, allowing ATLAS to make much more precise measurements of its mass and interactions with other particles. These measurements provide indirect information on the details of the Standard Model, with the possibility of revealing inconsistencies that point to new physics.

=== Beyond the Standard Model ===
While the Standard Model predicts that quarks, leptons and neutrinos should exist, it does not explain why the masses of these particles are so different (they differ by orders of magnitude). Furthermore, the mass of the neutrinos should be, according to the Standard Model, exactly zero as that of the photon. Instead, neutrinos have mass. In 1998 research results at detector Super-Kamiokande determined that neutrinos can oscillate from one flavor to another, which dictates that they have a mass other than zero. For these and other reasons, many particle physicists believe it is possible that the Standard Model will break down at energies at the teraelectronvolt (TeV) scale or higher. Most alternative theories, the Grand Unified Theories (GUTs) including Supersymmetry (SUSY), predicts the existence of new particles with masses greater than those of Standard Model.

==== Supersymmetry ====
Most of the currently proposed theories predict new higher-mass particles, some of which may be light enough to be observed by ATLAS. Models of supersymmetry involve new, highly massive particles. In many cases these decay into high-energy quarks and stable heavy particles that are very unlikely to interact with ordinary matter. The stable particles would escape the detector, leaving as a signal one or more high-energy quark jets and a large amount of "missing" momentum. Other hypothetical massive particles, like those in the Kaluza–Klein theory, might leave a similar signature. The data collected up to the end of LHC Run II do not show evidence of supersymmetric or unexpected particles, the research of which will continue in the data that will be collected from Run III onwards.

==== CP violation ====
The asymmetry between the behavior of matter and antimatter, known as CP violation, is also being investigated. Recent experiments dedicated to measurements of CP violation, such as BaBar and Belle, have not detected sufficient CP violation in the Standard Model to explain the lack of detectable antimatter in the universe. It is possible that new models of physics will introduce additional CP violation, shedding light on this problem. Evidence supporting these models might either be detected directly by the production of new particles, or indirectly by measurements of the properties of B- and D-mesons. LHCb, an LHC experiment dedicated to B-mesons, is likely to be better suited to the latter.

==== Microscopic black holes ====
Some hypotheses, based on the ADD model, involve large extra dimensions and predict that micro black holes could be formed by the LHC. These would decay immediately by means of Hawking radiation, producing all particles in the Standard Model in equal numbers and leaving an unequivocal signature in the ATLAS detector.

== ATLAS detector ==
The ATLAS detector is 46 metres long, 25 metres in diameter, and weighs about 7,000 tonnes; it contains some 3,000 km of cable.

At 27 km in circumference, the Large Hadron Collider (LHC) at CERN collides two beams of protons together, with each proton carrying up to 6.8 TeV of energy – enough to produce particles with masses significantly greater than any particles currently known, if these particles exist. When the proton beams produced by the Large Hadron Collider interact in the center of the detector, a variety of different particles with a broad range of energies are produced.

=== General-purpose requirements ===
The ATLAS detector is designed to be general-purpose. Rather than focusing on a particular physical process, ATLAS is designed to measure the broadest possible range of signals. This is intended to ensure that whatever form any new physical processes or particles might take, ATLAS will be able to detect them and measure their properties. ATLAS is designed to detect these particles, namely their masses, momentum, energies, lifetime, charges, and nuclear spins.

Experiments at earlier colliders, such as the Tevatron and Large Electron–Positron Collider, were also designed for general-purpose detection. However, the beam energy and extremely high rate of collisions require ATLAS to be significantly larger and more complex than previous experiments, presenting unique challenges of the Large Hadron Collider.

=== Layered design ===
In order to identify all particles produced at the interaction point where the particle beams collide, the detector is designed in layers made up of detectors of different types, each of which is designed to observe specific types of particles. The different traces that particles leave in each layer of the detector allow for effective particle identification and accurate measurements of energy and momentum. (The role of each layer in the detector is discussed below.) As the energy of the particles produced by the accelerator increases, the detectors attached to it must grow to effectively measure and stop higher-energy particles. As of 2022, the ATLAS detector is the largest ever built at a particle collider.

=== Detector systems ===
Computer generated cut-away view of the ATLAS detector showing its various components. Muon Spectrometer: (1) Forward regions (End-caps) (1) Barrel region Magnet System: (2) Toroid Magnets (3) Solenoid Magnet Inner Detector: (4) Transition Radiation Tracker (5) Semi-Conductor Tracker (6) Pixel Detector Calorimeters: (7) Liquid Argon Calorimeter (8) Tile Calorimeter

The ATLAS detector consists of a series of ever-larger concentric cylinders around the interaction point where the proton beams from the LHC collide. Maintaining detector performance in the high radiation areas immediately surrounding the proton beams is a significant engineering challenge. The detector can be divided into four major systems:

1. Inner Detector;
2. Calorimeters;
3. Muon Spectrometer;
4. Magnet system.

Each of these is in turn made of multiple layers. The detectors are complementary: the Inner Detector tracks particles precisely, the calorimeters measure the energy of easily stopped particles, and the muon system makes additional measurements of highly penetrating muons. The two magnet systems bend charged particles in the Inner Detector and the Muon Spectrometer, allowing their electric charges and momenta to be measured. The only established stable particles that cannot be detected directly are neutrinos; their presence is inferred by measuring a momentum imbalance among detected particles. For this to work, the detector must be "hermetic", meaning it must detect all non-neutrinos produced, with no blind spots.

The installation of all the above detector systems was finished in August 2008. The detectors collected millions of cosmic rays during the magnet repairs which took place between fall 2008 and fall 2009, prior to the first proton collisions. The detector operated with close to 100% efficiency and provided performance characteristics very close to its design values.

=== Inner Detector ===
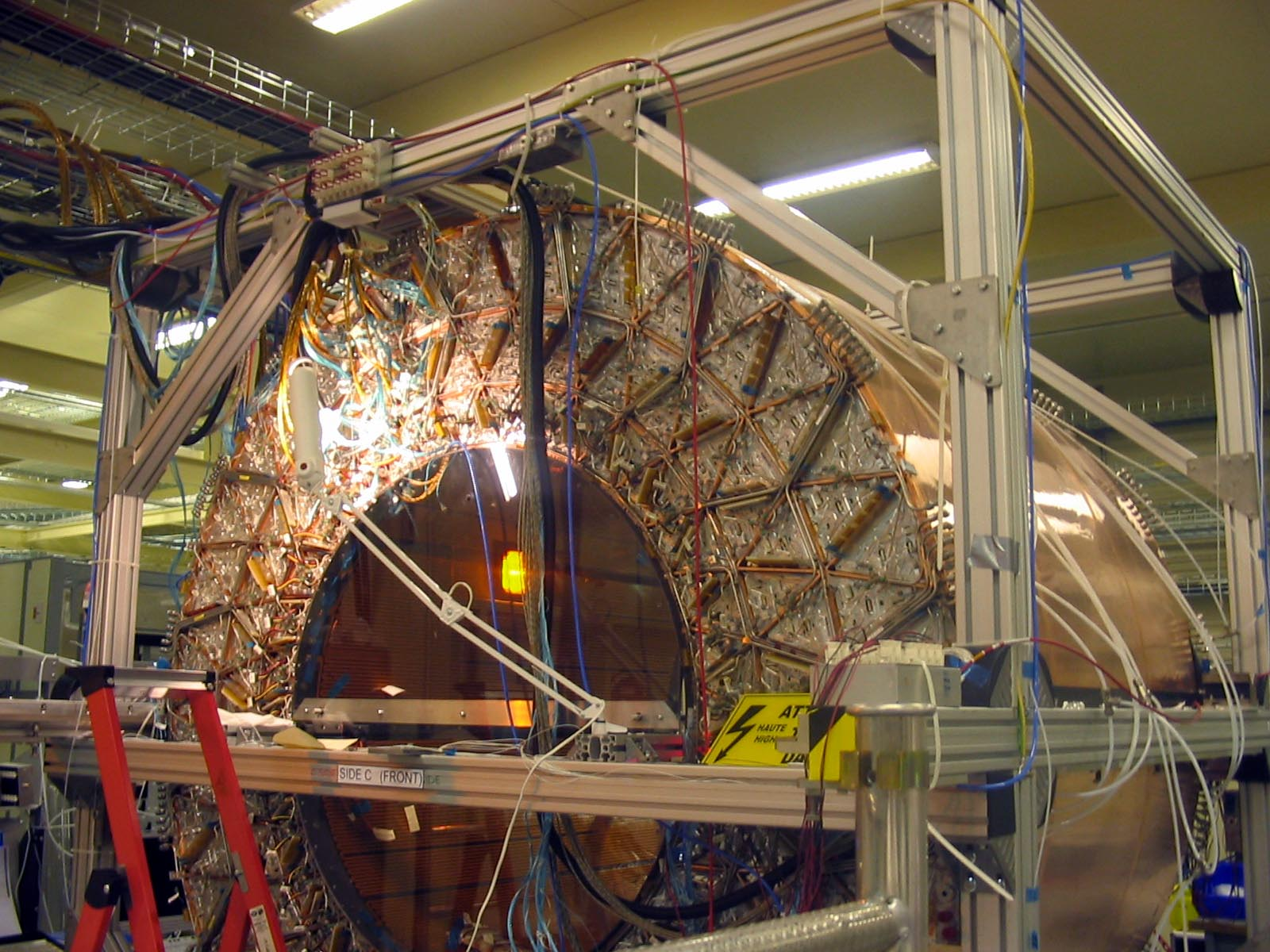
The TRT (Transition Radiation Tracker) central section, the outermost part of the Inner Detector, assembled above ground and taking data from cosmic rays in September 2005.

The Inner Detector begins a few centimetres from the proton beam axis, extends to a radius of 1.2 metres, and is 6.2 metres in length along the beam pipe. Its basic function is to track charged particles by detecting their interaction with material at discrete points, revealing detailed information about the types of particles and their momentum. The Inner Detector has three parts, which are explained below.

The magnetic field surrounding the entire inner detector causes charged particles to curve; the direction of the curve reveals a particle's charge and the degree of curvature reveals its momentum. The starting points of the tracks yield useful information for identifying particles; for example, if a group of tracks seem to originate from a point other than the original proton–proton collision, this may be a sign that the particles came from the decay of a hadron with a bottom quark (see b-tagging).

==== Pixel Detector ====
The Pixel Detector, the innermost part of the detector, contains four concentric layers and three disks on each end-cap, with a total of 1,744 modules, each measuring 2 centimetres by 6 centimetres. The detecting material is 250 μm thick silicon. Each module contains 16 readout chips and other electronic components. The smallest unit that can be read out is a pixel (50 by 400 micrometres); there are roughly 47,000 pixels per module.

The minute pixel size is designed for extremely precise tracking very close to the interaction point. In total, the Pixel Detector has over 92 million readout channels, which is about 50% of the total readout channels of the whole detector. Having such a large count created a considerable design and engineering challenge. Another challenge was the radiation to which the Pixel Detector is exposed because of its proximity to the interaction point, requiring that all components be radiation hardened in order to continue operating after significant exposures.

==== Semi-Conductor Tracker ====
The Semi-Conductor Tracker (SCT) is the middle component of the inner detector. It is similar in concept and function to the Pixel Detector but with long, narrow strips rather than small pixels, making coverage of a larger area practical. Each strip measures 80 micrometres by 12 centimetres. The SCT is the most critical part of the inner detector for basic tracking in the plane perpendicular to the beam, since it measures particles over a much larger area than the Pixel Detector, with more sampled points and roughly equal (albeit one-dimensional) accuracy. It is composed of four double layers of silicon strips, and has 6.3 million readout channels and a total area of 61 square meters.

==== Transition Radiation Tracker ====
The Transition Radiation Tracker (TRT), the outermost component of the inner detector, is a combination of a straw tracker and a transition radiation detector. The detecting elements are drift tubes (straws), each four millimetres in diameter and up to 144 centimetres long. The uncertainty of track position measurements (position resolution) is about 200 micrometres. This is not as precise as those for the other two detectors, but it was necessary to reduce the cost of covering a larger volume and to have transition radiation detection capability. Each straw is filled with gas that becomes ionized when a charged particle passes through. The straws are held at about −1,500 V, driving the negative ions to a fine wire down the centre of each straw, producing a current pulse (signal) in the wire. The wires with signals create a pattern of 'hit' straws that allow the path of the particle to be determined. Between the straws, materials with widely varying indices of refraction cause ultra-relativistic charged particles to produce transition radiation and leave much stronger signals in some straws. Xenon and argon gas is used to increase the number of straws with strong signals. Since the amount of transition radiation is greatest for highly relativistic particles (those with a speed very near the speed of light), and because particles of a particular energy have a higher speed the lighter they are, particle paths with many very strong signals can be identified as belonging to the lightest charged particles: electrons and their antiparticles, positrons. The TRT has about 298,000 straws in total.

=== Calorimeters ===
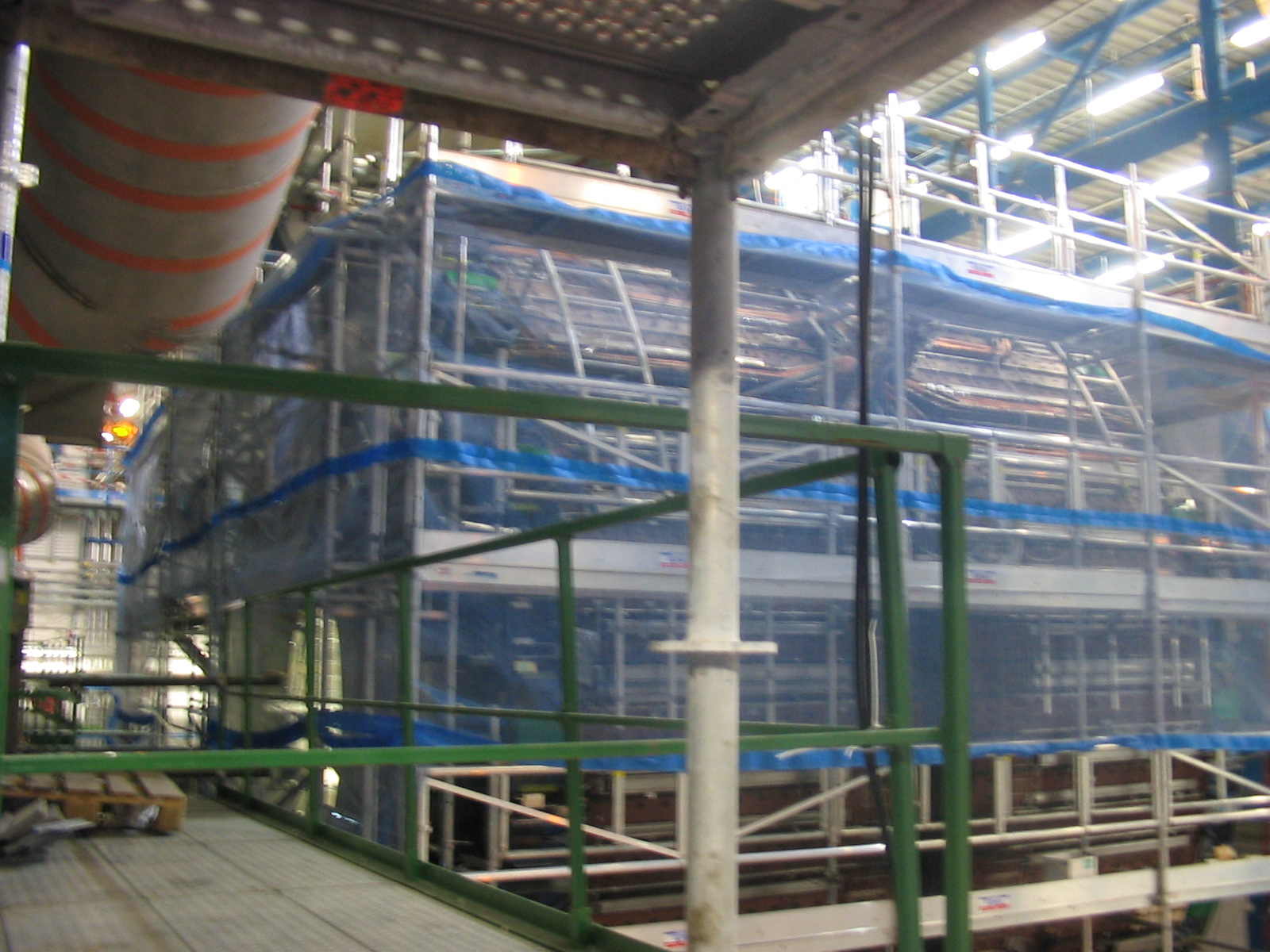
September 2005: The main barrel section of the ATLAS hadronic calorimeter, waiting to be moved inside the toroid magnets.

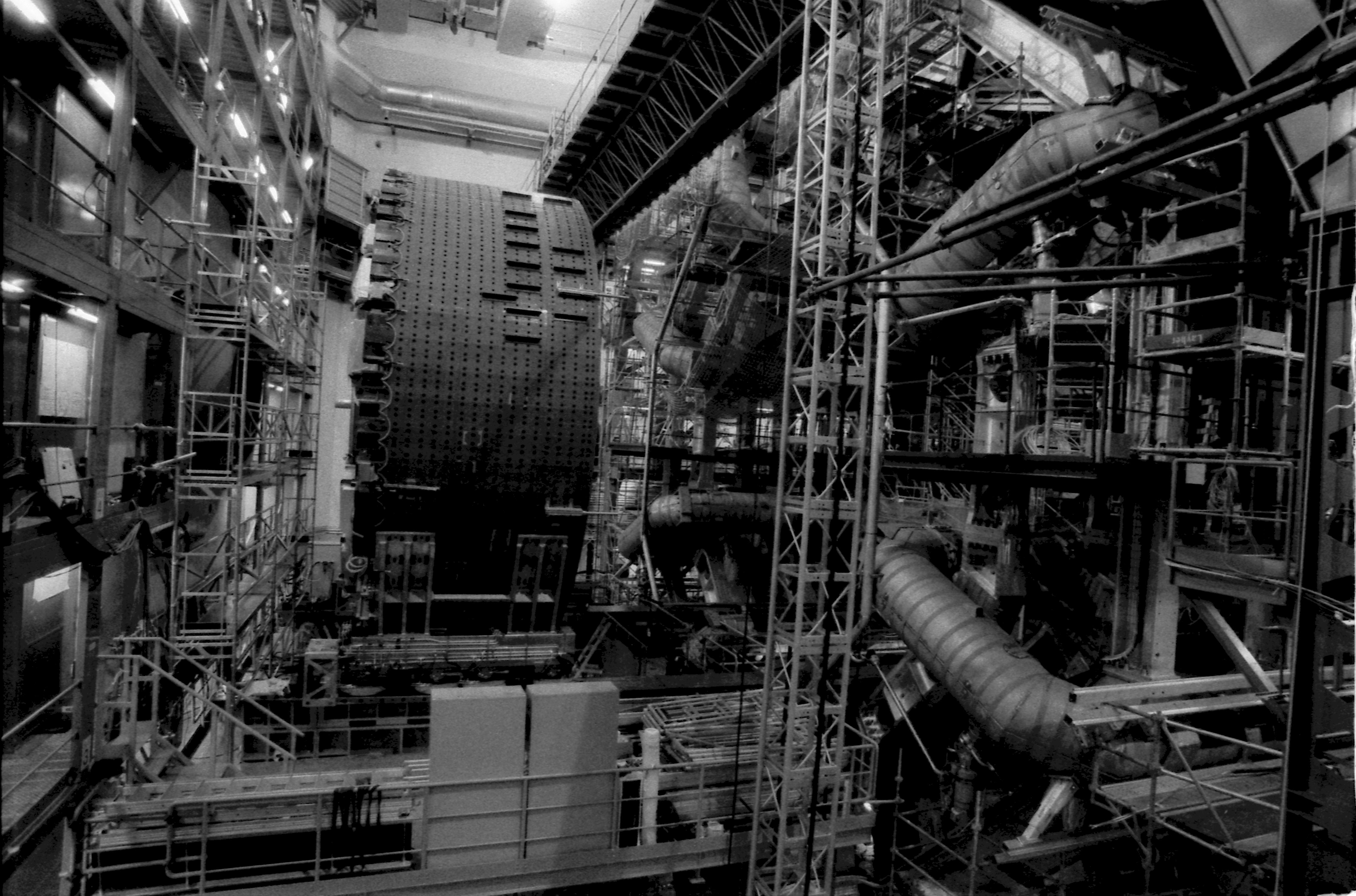
One of the sections of the extensions of the hadronic calorimeter, waiting to be inserted in late February 2006.

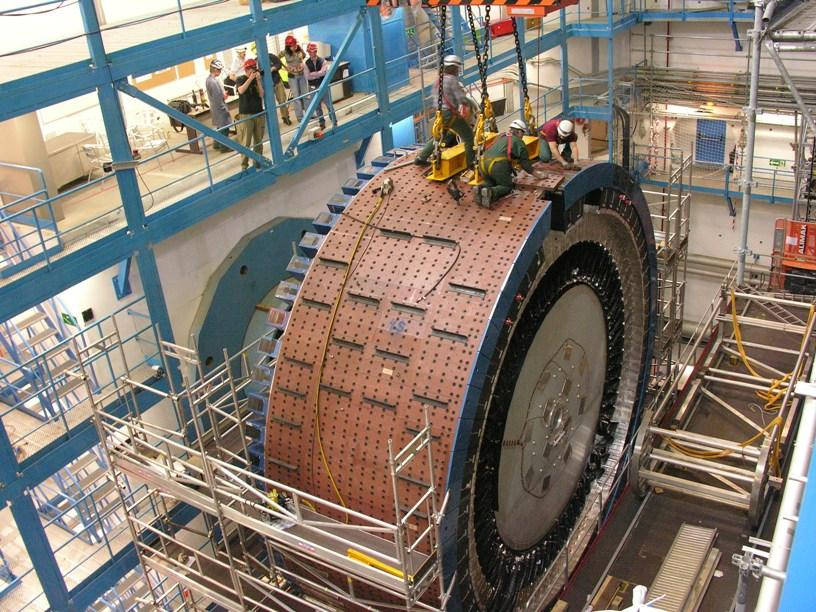
The extended barrel section of the hadronic calorimeter.

The calorimeters are situated outside the solenoidal magnet that surrounds the Inner Detector. Their purpose is to measure the energy from particles by absorbing it. There are two basic calorimeter systems: an inner electromagnetic calorimeter and an outer hadronic calorimeter. Both are sampling calorimeters; that is, they absorb energy in high-density metal and periodically sample the shape of the resulting particle shower, inferring the energy of the original particle from this measurement.

==== Electromagnetic calorimeter ====
The electromagnetic (EM) calorimeter absorbs energy from particles that interact electromagnetically, which include charged particles and photons. It has high precision, both in the amount of energy absorbed and in the precise location of the energy deposited. The angle between the particle's trajectory and the detector's beam axis (or more precisely the pseudorapidity) and its angle within the perpendicular plane are both measured to within roughly 0.025 radians. The barrel EM calorimeter has accordion shaped electrodes and the energy-absorbing materials are lead and stainless steel, with liquid argon as the sampling material, and a cryostat is required around the EM calorimeter to keep it sufficiently cool.

==== Hadron calorimeter ====
The hadron calorimeter absorbs energy from particles that pass through the EM calorimeter, but do interact via the strong force; these particles are primarily hadrons. It is less precise, both in energy magnitude and in the localization (within about 0.1 radians only). The energy-absorbing material is steel, with scintillating tiles that sample the energy deposited. Many of the features of the calorimeter are chosen for their cost-effectiveness; the instrument is large and comprises a huge amount of construction material: the main part of the calorimeter – the tile calorimeter – is 8 metres in diameter and covers 12 metres along the beam axis. The far-forward sections of the hadronic calorimeter are contained within the forward EM calorimeter's cryostat, and use liquid argon as well, while copper and tungsten are used as absorbers.

=== Muon Spectrometer ===
The Muon Spectrometer is an extremely large tracking system, consisting of three parts:

1. A magnetic field provided by three toroidal magnets;
2. A set of 1200 chambers measuring with high spatial precision the tracks of the outgoing muons;
3. A set of triggering chambers with accurate time-resolution.

The extent of this sub-detector starts at a radius of 4.25 m close to the calorimeters out to the full radius of the detector (11 m). Its tremendous size is required to accurately measure the momentum of muons, which first go through all the other elements of the detector before reaching the muon spectrometer. It was designed to measure, standalone, the momentum of 100 GeV muons with 3% accuracy and of 1 TeV muons with 10% accuracy. It was vital to go to the lengths of putting together such a large piece of equipment because a number of interesting physical processes can only be observed if one or more muons are detected, and because the total energy of particles in an event could not be measured if the muons were ignored. It functions similarly to the Inner Detector, with muons curving so that their momentum can be measured, albeit with a different magnetic field configuration, lower spatial precision, and a much larger volume. It also serves the function of simply identifying muons – very few particles of other types are expected to pass through the calorimeters and subsequently leave signals in the Muon Spectrometer. It has roughly one million readout channels, and its layers of detectors have a total area of 12,000 square meters.

=== Magnet System ===
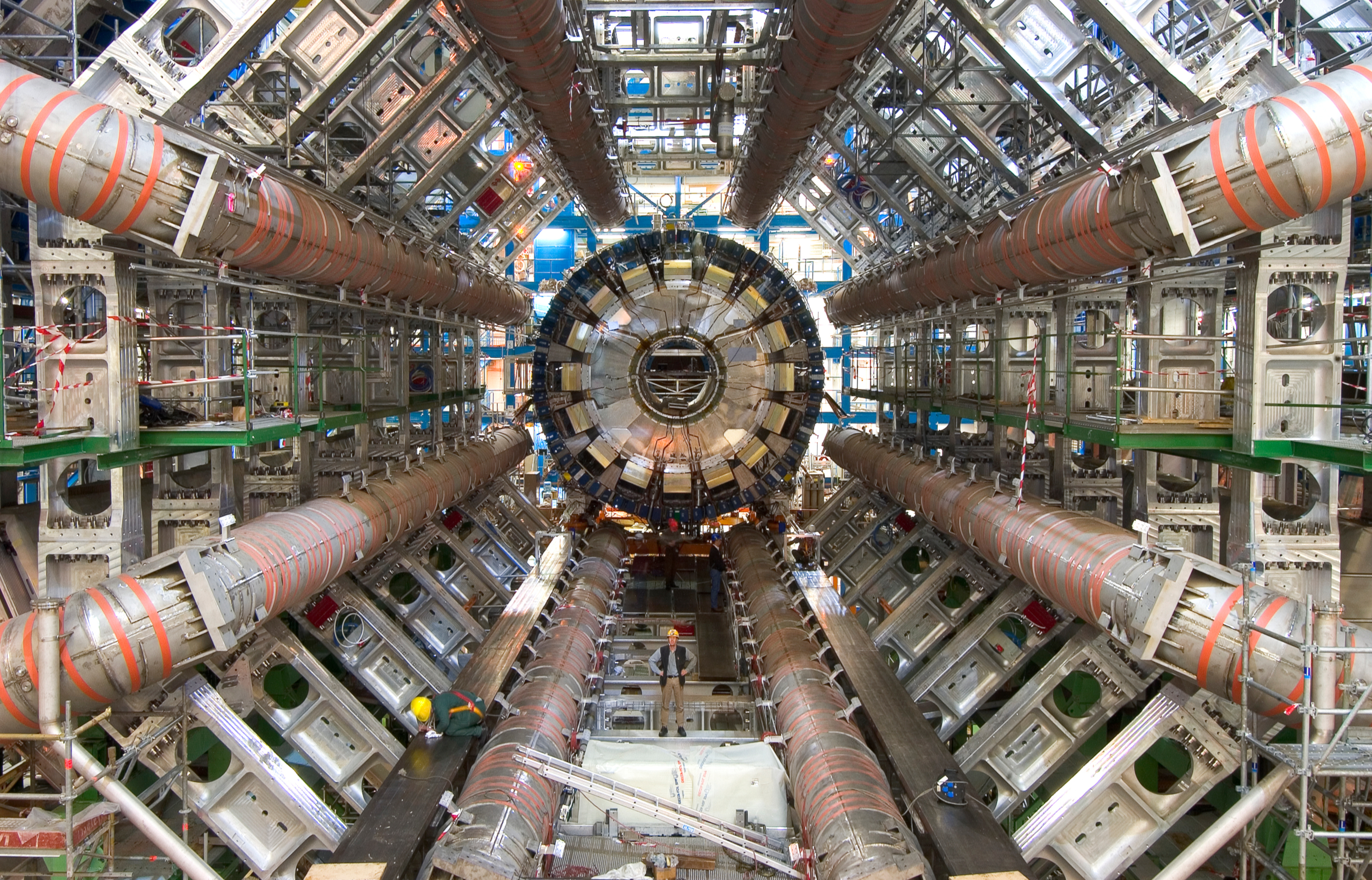
The eight toroid magnets of the ATLAS detector

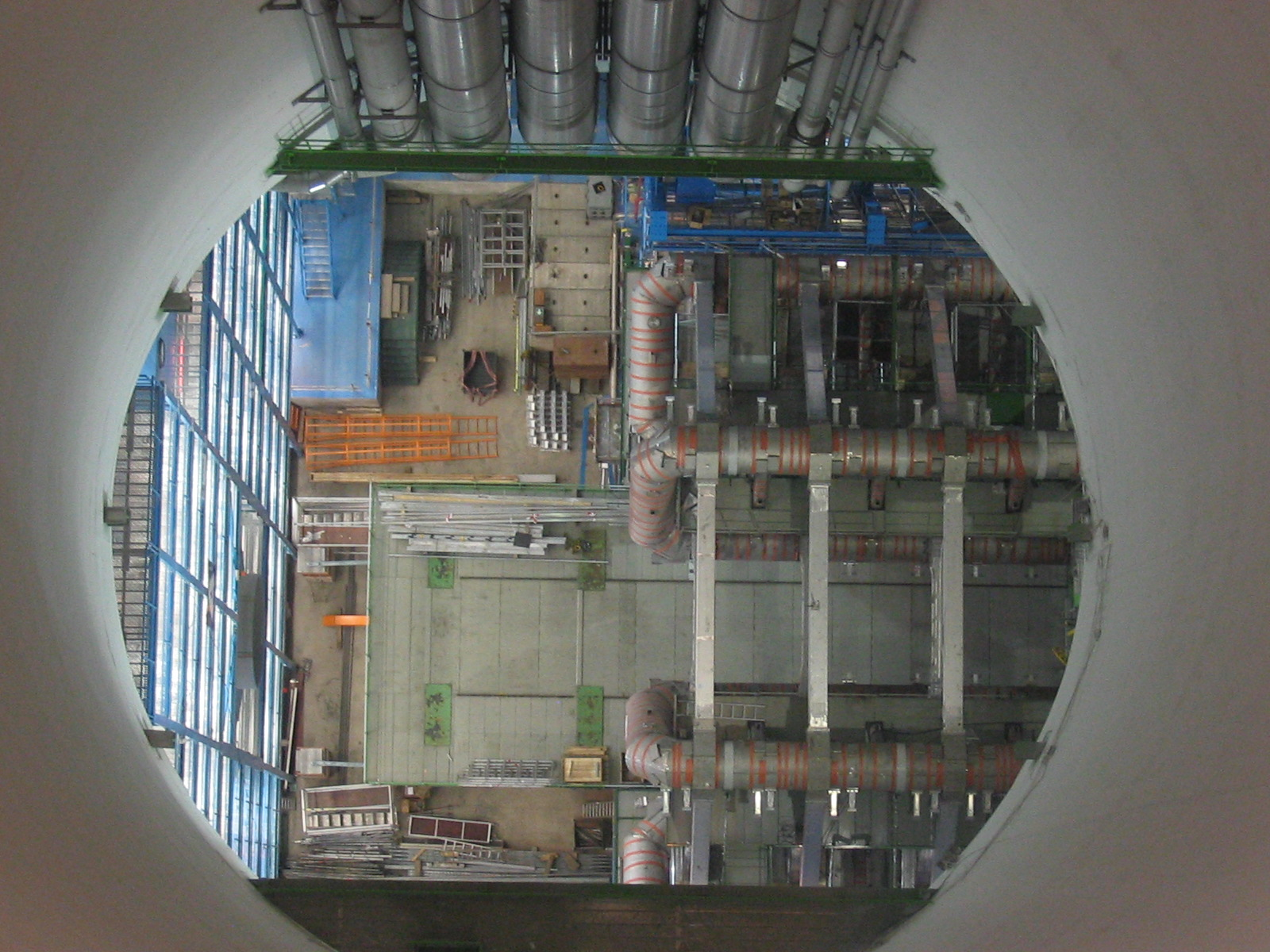
The ends of four of the eight ATLAS toroid magnets, looking down from about 90 metres above, in September 2005

The ATLAS detector uses two large superconducting magnet systems to bend the trajectory of charged particles, so that their momenta can be measured. This bending is due to the Lorentz force, whose modulus is proportional to the electric charge $q$ of the particle, to its speed $v$ and to the intensity $B$ of the magnetic field:

$$F = q \, v \, B.$$

Since all particles produced in the LHC's proton collisions are traveling at very close to the speed of light in vacuum $(v \simeq c)$, the Lorentz force is about the same for all the particles with same electric charge $q$:

$$F \simeq q \, c \, B.$$

The radius of curvature $r$ due to the Lorentz force is equal to

$$r = \frac{p}{q \, B}.$$

where $p = \gamma \, m \, v$ is the relativistic momentum of the particle. As a result, high-momentum particles curve very little (large $r$), while low-momentum particles curve significantly (small $r$). The amount of curvature can be quantified and the particle momentum can be determined from this value.

==== Solenoid Magnet ====
The inner solenoid produces a two tesla magnetic field surrounding the Inner Detector. This high magnetic field allows even very energetic particles to curve enough for their momentum to be determined, and its nearly uniform direction and strength allow measurements to be made very precisely. Particles with momenta below roughly 400 MeV will be curved so strongly that they will loop repeatedly in the field and most likely not be measured; however, this energy is very small compared to the several TeV of energy released in each proton collision.

==== Toroid Magnets ====
The outer toroidal magnetic field is produced by eight very large air-core superconducting barrel loops and two smaller end-caps air toroidal magnets, for a total of 24 barrel loops all situated outside the calorimeters and within the muon system. This magnetic field extends in an area 26 metres long and 20 metres in diameter, and it stores 1.6 gigajoules of energy. Its magnetic field is not uniform, because a solenoid magnet of sufficient size would be prohibitively expensive to build. It varies between 2 and 8 Teslameters.

=== Forward detectors ===
The ATLAS detector is complemented by a set of four sub-detectors in the forward region to measure particles at very small angles.

1. LUCID (LUminosity Cherenkov Integrating Detector)
  is the first of these detectors designed to measure luminosity, and located in the ATLAS cavern at 17 m from the interaction point between the two muon endcaps;
2. ZDC (Zero Degree Calorimeter)
  is designed to measure neutral particles on-axis to the beam, and located at 140 m from the IP in the LHC tunnel where the two beams are split back into separate beam pipes;
3. AFP (Atlas Forward Proton)
  is designed to tag diffractive events, and located at 204 m and 217 m;
4. ALFA (Absolute Luminosity For ATLAS)
  is designed to measure elastic proton scattering located at 240 m just before the bending magnets of the LHC arc.

=== Data systems ===
==== Data generation ====
Earlier particle detector read-out and event detection systems were based on parallel shared buses such as VMEbus or FASTBUS. Since such a bus architecture cannot keep up with the data requirements of the LHC detectors, all the ATLAS data acquisition systems rely on high-speed point-to-point links and switching networks. Even with advanced electronics for data reading and storage, the ATLAS detector generates too much raw data to read out or store everything: about 25 MB per raw event, multiplied by 40 million beam crossings per second (40 MHz) in the center of the detector. This produces a total of 1 petabyte of raw data per second. By avoiding to write empty segments of each event (zero suppression), which do not contain physical information, the average size of an event is reduced to 1.6 MB, for a total of 64 terabyte of data per second.

==== Trigger system ====
The trigger system uses fast event reconstruction to identify, in real time, the most interesting events to retain for detailed analysis. In the second data-taking period of the LHC, Run-2, there were two distinct trigger levels:

1. The Level 1 trigger (L1), implemented in custom hardware at the detector site. The decision to save or reject an event data is made in less than 2.5 μs. It uses reduced granularity information from the calorimeters and the muon spectrometer, and reduces the rate of events in the read-out from 40 MHz to 100 kHz. The L1 rejection factor in therefore equal to 400.
2. The High Level Trigger trigger (HLT), implemented in software, uses a computer battery consisting of approximately 40,000 CPUs. In order to decide which of the 100,000 events per second coming from L1 to save, specific analyses of each collision are carried out in 200 μs. The HLT uses limited regions of the detector, so-called Regions of Interest (RoI), to be reconstructed with the full detector granularity, including tracking, and allows matching of energy deposits to tracks. The HLT rejection factor is 100: after this step, the rate of events is reduced from 100 to 1 kHz. The remaining data, corresponding to about 1,000 events per second, are stored for further analyses.

==== Analysis process ====
ATLAS permanently records more than 10 petabytes of data per year. Offline event reconstruction is performed on all permanently stored events, turning the pattern of signals from the detector into physics objects, such as jets, photons, and leptons. Grid computing is being used extensively for event reconstruction, allowing the parallel use of university and laboratory computer networks throughout the world for the CPU-intensive task of reducing large quantities of raw data into a form suitable for physics analysis. The software for these tasks has been under development for many years, and refinements are ongoing, even after data collection has begun. Individuals and groups within the collaboration are continuously writing their own code to perform further analyses of these objects, searching the patterns of detected particles for particular physical models or hypothetical particles. This activity requires processing 25 petabytes of data every week.
