= Roy Schwitters =

American physicist (1944–2023)

Roy F. Schwitters
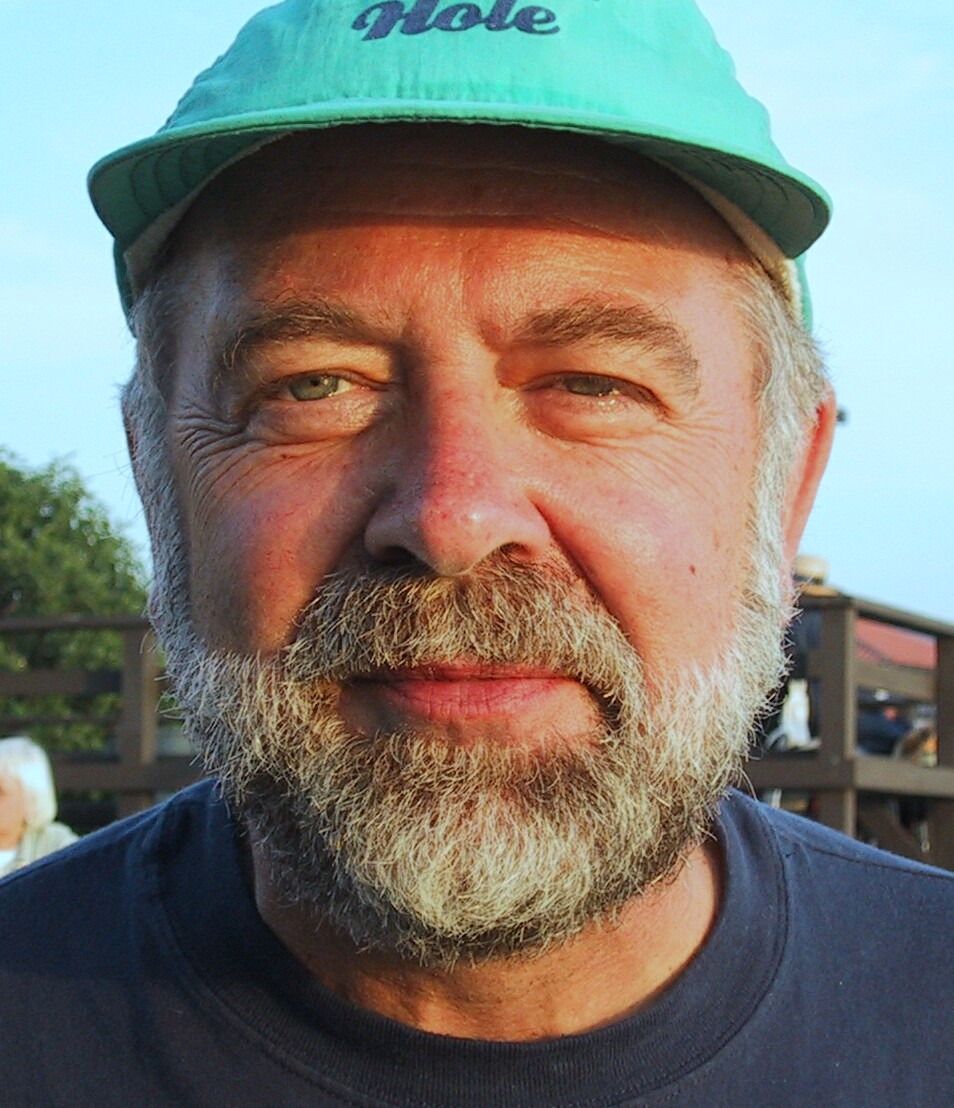
- Schwitters in 2001
- Born: 20 June 1944; Seattle, Washington, U.S.
- Died: 10 January 2023 (aged 78); Orcas Island, Washington, U.S.
- Known for: Director for the unfinished Superconducting Super Collider
- Spouse: Karen Schwitters
- Children: 3
- Awards: Alan T. Waterman Award (1980) Panofsky Prize (1996)
- Scientific career
- Fields: Physicist
- Institutions: Harvard, University of Texas in Austin

Roy F. Schwitters (20 June 1944 – 10 January 2023) was an American physicist, professor of physics at Harvard, Stanford, and finally the University of Texas at Austin. He was also director of the Superconducting Super Collider between 1989 and 1993.

== Education ==
Schwitters earned a B.S at MIT in 1966, and a Ph.D. there in 1971, with a dissertation titled, Pi Plus Meson Photoproduction from H with Linearly Polarized Photons at 12 GeV. He conducted his doctoral research at the Stanford Linear Accelerator Center.

== Career ==
Schwitters was a researcher involved with the MIT Laboratory for Nuclear Science's Moby Dick project at the Cambridge Electron Accelerator in the late 1960s.

An early major accomplishment in Schwitters' career was to oversee the design and construction of the Cylindrical Wire Spark Chambers of the Mark I (detector) experiment, which operated at the interaction point of the SPEAR collider at the Stanford SLAC Laboratory from 1973 to 1977, and major involvement in the analysis and interpretation of the data that resulted in the discovery of the J/ψ particle (which resulted in the Nobel Prize for Burton Richter in 1976). A description of the discovery of the J/ψ particle and his key role in this discovery is given by this article/talk from Burton Richter.

Another major accomplishment in Schwitters' career was as a founding member and becoming the associate head in 1980 of the Collider Detector at Fermilab experiment, with significant involvement in managing the initial construction and development of CDF, leading up to the initial Run 0 commissioning run before any upgrades (1988-1989).

Schwitters was director of the Superconducting Super Collider (SSC) in Waxahachie, Texas starting in 1989, and ending in October 1993 when the funding for its construction was terminated by Congress. During the events leading up to the project's cancellation, Schwitters was famously quoted, "The SSC is becoming the victim of the revenge of the C students." In a 2021 interview, he speculated that, had the project been completed, it would have led to the discovery of the Higgs boson particle in Waxahachie 10 years before its eventual discovery at CERN's Large Hadron Collider in Switzerland and attracted an equivalent number of visitors to CERN's 120,000 per year.

Beginning 2004, Schwitters led the University of Texas Maya Muon Tomography research team. From 2005 to 2011, he was the chair of the JASON Defense Advisory Group.

Schwitters died at the age of 78 due to cancer, in Orcas Island, Washington.

== Awards and honors ==
1980: Alan T. Waterman Award of the National Science Foundation.

1984: Elected Fellow, American Physical Society, Citation: For vital contributions to the discovery of the family of particles and of their properties; for leadership in developing the pp colliding beam physics program at FNAL and building the CDF detector.

1987: Fellow, American Academy of Arts and Sciences

1990: S.W. Richardson Foundation Regental Professor of Physics, University of Texas at Austin.

1996: Panofsky Prize, Citation: Gail Hanson and Roy Schwitters are honored for their separate contributions which together provided the first clear evidence that hadronic final states in e+ e- annihilation, which are largely composed of spin 0 and spin 1 particles, originate from the fragmentation of spin 1/2 quarks. Roy Schwitters used muon pair production to measure the polarization of the beams in the electron-positron storage ring SPEAR. He showed that the azimuthal distribution of high momentum hadrons in hadronic final states was the same as that observed for muon pairs, consistent with the origin of these hadrons from the fragmentation of spin 1/2 quarks.
