= Hermetic detector =

Particle detector designed to observe all decay products

In particle physics, a hermetic detector (also called a 4π detector) is a particle detector designed to register as many particles as possible produced by a high-energy collision in a particle accelerator. The name "hermetic" refers to the detector being conceptually "airtight," aiming to ensure that few particles from the collision escape undetected. The name "4π detector" comes from the fact that such detectors are designed to cover nearly all of the 4π steradians of solid angle around the interaction point.

The main goal of a hermetic design is to allow for a complete accounting of the energy and momentum from an interaction. This is critical for identifying the presence of particles like neutrinos, which do not interact with the detector directly. Their presence is instead inferred by measuring an imbalance in the total momentum, known as missing transverse energy. By maximizing its acceptance—the range of particle trajectories it can observe—a hermetic detector ensures such measurements are as accurate as possible.

The first such detector was the Mark I at the Stanford Linear Accelerator Center. The design proved essential for studying interactions involving large exchanges of energy and has been used for all subsequent general-purpose collider detectors, including the CDF and DØ detectors at the Tevatron, and the ATLAS and CMS detectors at the LHC.

== Design and coverage ==
The "4π" in "4π detector" refers to the ideal goal of covering the full solid angle of 4π steradians around the collision's interaction point. In the standard coordinate system used in collider physics, this corresponds to observing particles across the entire range of the azimuthal angle ($-\pi \leq \phi \leq \pi$) and pseudorapidity ($|\eta| \geq 0$).

In practice, it's impossible to achieve perfect coverage. Particles that are emitted at a very small angle to the beamline (corresponding to a high pseudorapidity) will travel down the beampipe and escape detection. This unavoidable gap in coverage means that the detector can only measure particles up to a certain maximum value of pseudorapidity. This observable range of angles and momenta is known as the detector's acceptance. A primary objective in the design of a hermetic detector is to maximize this acceptance by minimizing the gaps.

== Components ==
A schematic of the basic components of a hermetic detector; I.P. refers to the region containing the interaction point for the colliding particles. This is a cross section of the typical cylindrical design.

There are three main components of a hermetic detector. From the inside out, the first is a tracker, which measures the momentum of charged particles as they curve in a magnetic field. Next there are one or more calorimeters, which measure the energy of most charged and neutral particles by absorbing them in dense material, and a muon system which measures the one type of particle that is not stopped through the calorimeters and can still be detected. Each component may have several different specialized sub-components.

=== Trackers ===
The detector's magnetic field causes the particle to rotate by accelerating it in a direction perpendicular to its motion via the Lorentz force. The tracking system plots the helix traced by such a charged particle as it travels through a magnetic field by localizing it in space in finely-segmented layers of detecting material, usually silicon. The particle's radius of curvature $R$ is proportional to its momentum perpendicular to the beam (i.e. transverse momentum or $p_T$) according to the formula $p_T = qBR$ (where $q$ is the particle's charge and $B$ is the magnetic induction), while the degree to which it drifts in the direction of the beam axis gives its momentum in that direction.

=== Calorimeters ===
Calorimeters slow particles down and absorb their energy into a material, allowing that energy to be measured. They are often divided into two types: the electromagnetic calorimeter that specializes in absorbing particles that interact electromagnetically, and the hadronic calorimeter that can detect hadrons, which interact via the strong nuclear force. A hadronic detector is required in particular to detect heavy neutral particles.

=== Muon system ===
Of all the known stable particles, only muons and neutrinos pass through the calorimeter without losing most or all of their energy. Neutrinos cannot be directly observed at collider experiments owing to their extremely small interaction cross section with hadronic matter (such as the detector is made of), and their existence must be inferred from the so-called "missing" (transverse) energy which is computed once all other particles in the event are accounted for. However muons (which are charged) can be measured by an additional tracking system outside the calorimeters.

== Particle identification ==
Most particles have unique combinations of signals left in each detector sub-system, allowing different particles to be identified. For example, an electron is charged and interacts electromagnetically, so it is tracked by the tracker and then deposits all of its energy in the (electromagnetic) calorimeter. By contrast, a photon is neutral and interacts electromagnetically, so it deposits its energy in the calorimeter without leaving a track.

== See also ==
- ATLAS experiment, for a detailed description of such a detector.
- Compact Muon Solenoid, for a well-illustrated description of another such detector.
