= Collider Detector at Fermilab =

American experimental physics device (1985–2011)

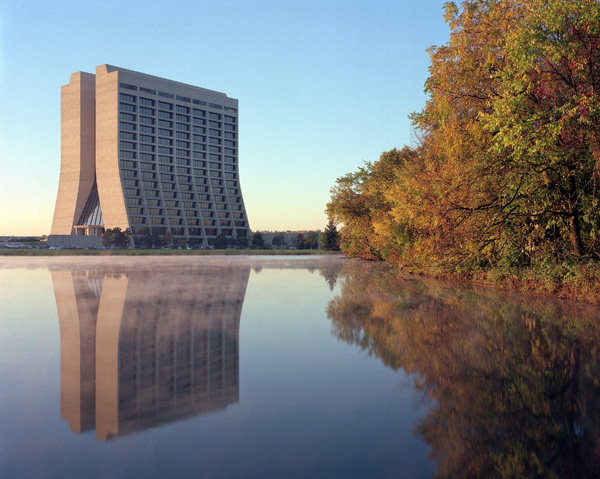
Wilson Hall at Fermilab

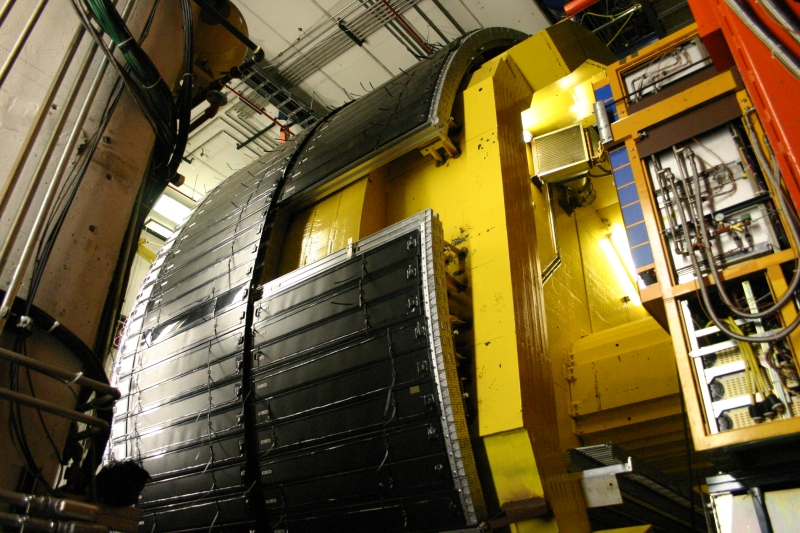
Part of the CDF detector

The Collider Detector at Fermilab (CDF) experimental collaboration studies high energy particle collisions from the Tevatron, the world's former highest-energy particle accelerator. The goal is to discover the identity and properties of the particles that make up the universe and to understand the forces and interactions between those particles.

CDF is an international collaboration that, at its peak, consisted of about 600 physicists (from about 30 American universities and National laboratories and about 30 groups from universities and national laboratories from Italy, Japan, UK, Canada, Germany, Spain, Russia, Finland, France, Taiwan, Korea, and Switzerland). The CDF detector itself weighed about 5000 tons and was about 12 meters in all three dimensions. The goal of the experiment is to measure exceptional events out of the billions of particle collisions in order to:

- Look for evidence for phenomena beyond the Standard Model of particle physics
- Measure and study the production and decay of heavy particles such as the top and bottom quarks, and the W and Z bosons
- Measure and study the production of high-energy particle jets and photons
- Study other phenomena such as diffraction

The Tevatron collided protons and antiprotons at a center-of-mass energy of about 2 TeV. The very high energy available for these collisions made it possible to produce heavy particles such as the top quark and the W and Z bosons, which weigh much more than a proton (or antiproton). These heavier particles were identified through their characteristic decays. The CDF apparatus recorded the trajectories and energies of electrons, photons and light hadrons. Neutrinos did not register in the apparatus, which led to an apparent missing energy.

There is another experiment similar to CDF called DØ which had a detector located at another point on the Tevatron ring.

== History ==
There were two particle detectors located on the Tevatron at Fermilab: CDF and DØ. CDF predated DØ as the first detector on the Tevatron. CDF's origins trace back to 1976, when Fermilab established the Colliding Beams Department under the leadership of Jim Cronin. This department focused on the development of both the accelerator that would produce colliding particle beams and the detector that would analyze those collisions. When the lab dissolved this department at the end of 1977, it established the Colliding Detector Facility Department under the leadership of Alvin Tollestrup. In 1980, Roy Schwitters became associate head of CDF and KEK in Japan and the National Laboratory of Frascati in Italy joined the collaboration. The collaboration completed a conceptual design report for CDF in the summer of 1981, and construction on the collision hall began on July 1, 1982. The lab dedicated the CDF detector on October 11, 1985, and CDF observed the Tevatron's first proton-antiproton collisions on October 13, 1985.

Over the years, two major updates were made to CDF. The first upgrade began in 1989 and the second began in 2001. Each upgrade was considered a "run". Run 0 was the run before any upgrades (1988–1989), Run I was after the first upgrade, and Run II was after the second upgrade. The upgrades for Run I included the addition of a silicon vertex detector (the first such detector to be installed in a hadron collider experiment), improvements to the central muon system, the addition of a vertex tracking system, the addition of central preradiator chambers, and improvements to the readout electronics and computer systems. Run II included upgrades on the central tracking system, preshower detectors and extension on muon coverage.

CDF took data until the Tevatron was shut down in 2011, but CDF scientists continue to analyze data collected by the experiment.

== Discovery of the top quark ==
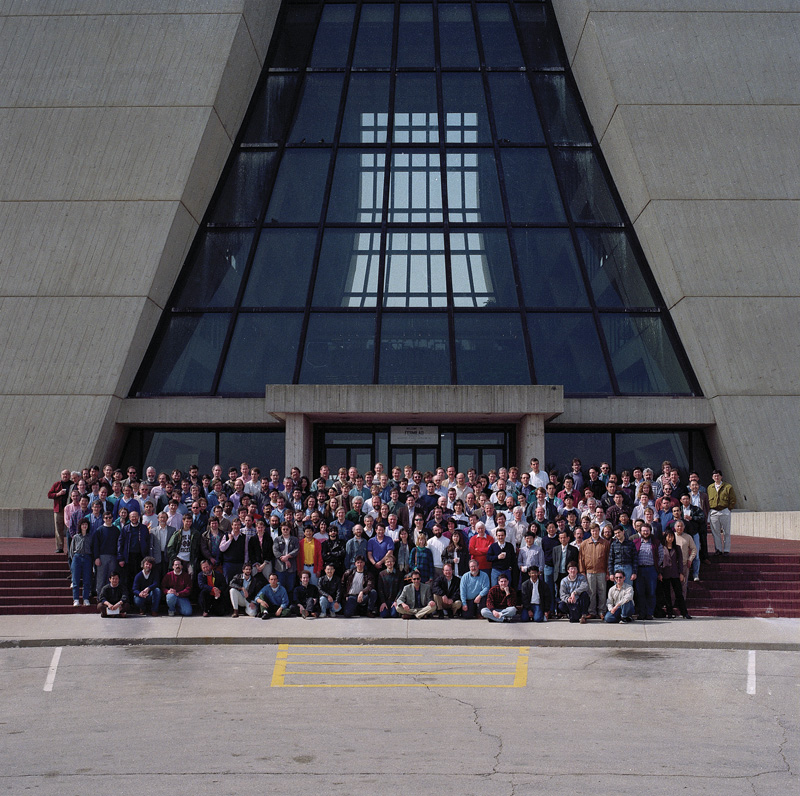
CDF Collaboration group photo, April 14, 1994

One of CDF's most famous discoveries is the observation of the top quark in February 1995. The existence of the top quark was hypothesized after the observation of the Upsilon at Fermilab in 1977, which was found to consist of a bottom quark and an anti-bottom quark. The Standard Model, the most widely accepted theory describing particles and their interactions, predicted the existence of three generations of quarks. The first generation quarks are the up and down quarks, second generation quarks are strange and charm, and third generation are top and bottom. The existence of the bottom quark solidified physicists' conviction that the top quark existed. The top quark was the last of the quarks to be observed, mostly due to its comparatively high mass. Whereas the masses of the other quarks range from .005 GeV (up quark) to 4.7GeV (bottom quark), the top quark has a mass of 175 GeV. Only Fermilab's Tevatron had the energy capability to produce and detect top anti-top pairs. The large mass of the top quark caused the top quark to decay almost instantaneously, within the order of 10^{−25} seconds, making it extremely difficult to observe. The Standard Model predicts that the top quark may decay leptonically into a bottom quark and a W boson. This W boson may then decay into a lepton and neutrino (t→Wb→ѵlb). Therefore, CDF worked to reconstruct top events, looking specifically for evidence of bottom quarks, W bosons neutrinos. Finally in February 1995, CDF had enough evidence to say that they had "discovered" the top quark. On February 24, CDF and DØ experimenters simultaneously submitted papers to Physical Review Letters describing the observation of the top quark. The two collaborations announced the discovery publicly at a seminar at Fermilab on March 2 and the papers were published on April 3.

In 2019, the European Physical Society awarded the 2019 High Energy and Particle Physics Prize to the CDF and DØ collaborations "for the discovery of the top quark and the detailed measurement of its properties."

== Other discoveries and milestones ==
On September 25, 2006, the CDF collaboration announced that they had discovered that the B-sub-s meson rapidly oscillates between matter and antimatter at a rate of 3 trillion times per second, a phenomenon called B–Bbar oscillation.

On January 8, 2007, the CDF collaboration announced that they had achieved the world's most precise measurement by a single experiment of the mass of the W boson. This provided new constraints on the possible mass of the then-undiscovered Higgs boson.

On April 7, 2022, the CDF collaboration announced in a paper published in the journal Science that they had made the most precise measurement ever of the mass of the W boson and found its actual mass to be significantly higher than the mass predicted by the Standard Model and the masses that had been measured before. In 2023, the ATLAS experiment at the Large Hadron Collider released an improved measurement for the mass of the W boson, 80,360 ± 16 MeV, which aligned with predictions from the Standard Model.

CDF scientists also discovered several other particles, including the B-sub-c meson (announced March 5, 1998); sigma-sub-b baryons, baryons consisting of two up quarks and a bottom quark and of two down quarks and a bottom quark (announced October 23, 2006); cascade-b baryons, consisting of a down, a strange, and a bottom quark (discovered jointly with DØ and announced on June 15, 2007); and omega-sub-b baryons, consisting of two strange quarks and a bottom quark (announced in June 2009).

== Detector layers ==
In order for physicists to understand the data corresponding to each event, they must understand the components of the CDF detector and how the detector works. Each component affects what the data will look like. Today, the 5000-ton detector sits in B0 and analyzes millions of beam collisions per second. The detector is designed in many different layers. Each of these layers work simultaneously with the other components of the detector in an effort to interact with the different particles, thereby giving physicists the opportunity to "see" and study the individual particles.

CDF can be divided into layers as follows:

- Layer 1: Beam Pipe
- Layer 2: Silicon Detector
- Layer 3: Central Outer Tracker
- Layer 4: Solenoid Magnet
- Layer 5: Electromagnetic Calorimeters
- Layer 6: Hadronic Calorimeters
- Layer 7: Muon Detectors

=== Layer 1: the beam pipe ===
The beam pipe is the innermost layer of CDF. The beam pipe is where the protons and anti-protons, traveling at approximately 0.99996 c, collide head on. Each of the protons is moving extremely close to the speed of light with extremely high energies. In a collision, much of the energy is converted into mass. This allows proton/anti-proton annihilation to produce daughter particles, such as top quarks with a mass of 175 GeV, much heavier than the original protons.

=== Layer 2: silicon detector ===
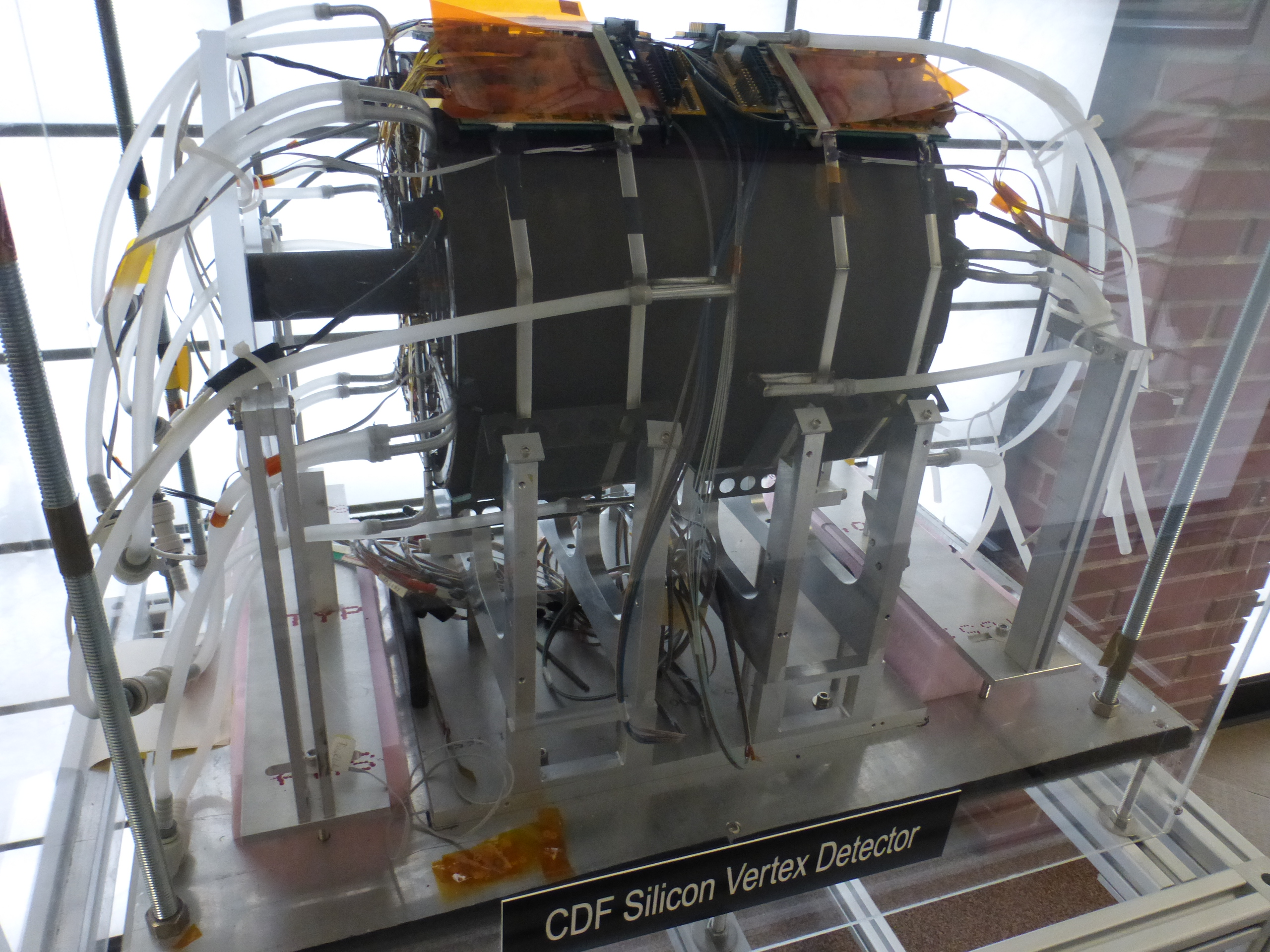
CDF silicon vertex detector

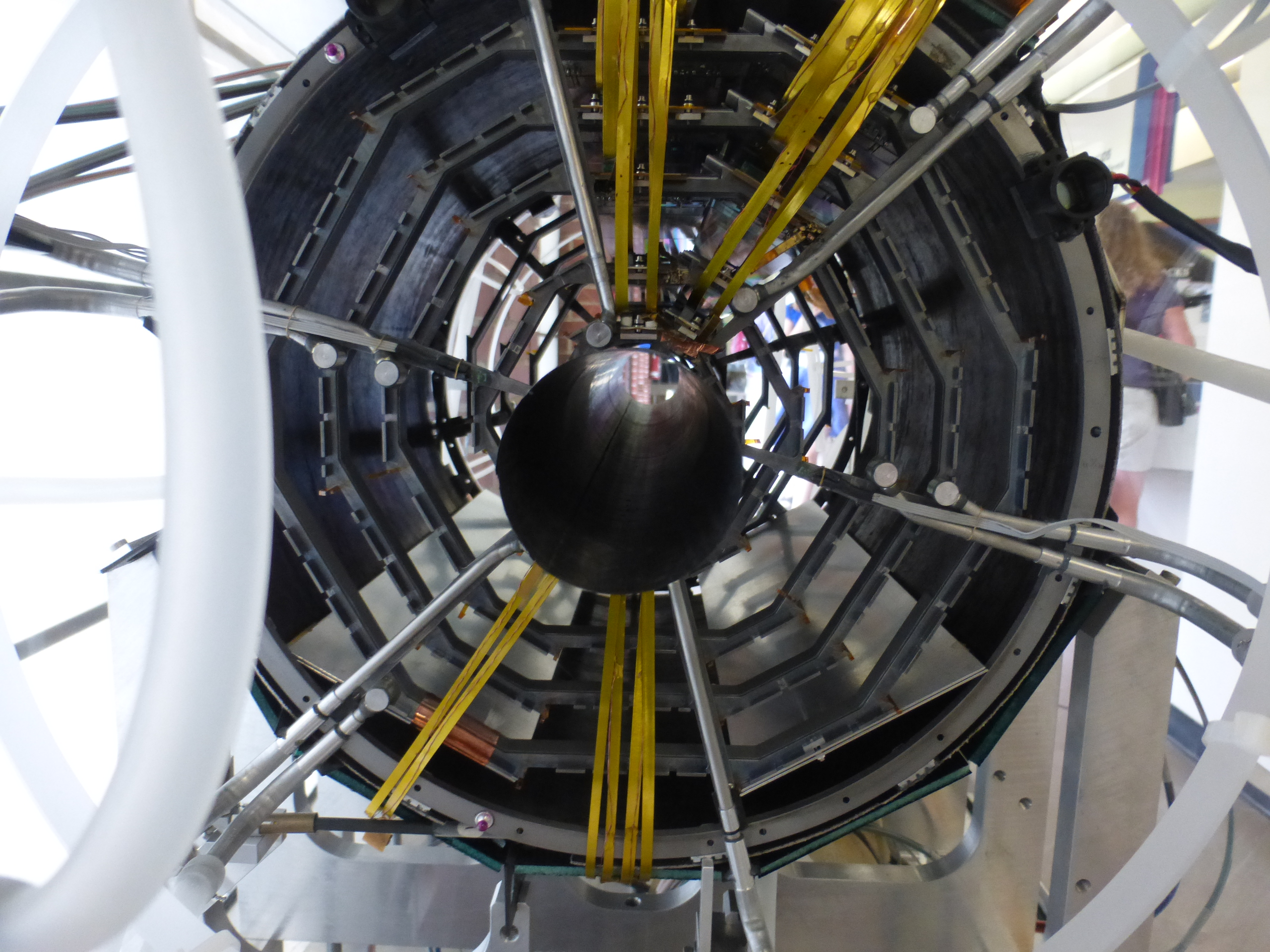
Cross section of the silicon detector

Surrounding the beam pipe is the silicon detector. This detector is used to track the path of charged particles as they travel through the detector. The silicon detector begins at a radius of r = 1.5 cm from the beam line and extends to a radius of r = 28 cm from the beam line. The silicon detector is composed of seven layers of silicon arranged in a barrel shape around the beam pipe. Silicon is often used in charged particle detectors because of its high sensitivity, allowing for high-resolution vertex and tracking. The first layer of silicon, known as Layer 00, is a single sided detector designed to separate signal from background even under extreme radiation. The remaining layers are double sided and radiation-hard, meaning that the layers are protected from damage from radioactivity. The silicon works to track the paths of charged particles as they pass through the detector by ionizing the silicon. The density of the silicon, coupled with the low ionization energy of silicon, allow ionization signals to travel quickly. As a particle travels through the silicon, its position will be recorded in 3 dimensions. The silicon detector has a track hit resolution of 10 μm, and impact parameter resolution of 30 μm. Physicists can look at this trail of ions and determine the path that the particle took. As the silicon detector is located within a magnetic field, the curvature of the path through the silicon allows physicists to calculate the momentum of the particle. More curvature means less momentum and vice versa.

=== Layer 3: central outer tracker (COT) ===
Outside of the silicon detector, the central outer tracker works in much the manner as the silicon detector as it is also used to track the paths of charged particles and is also located within a magnetic field. The COT, however, is not made of silicon. Silicon is tremendously expensive and is not practical to purchase in extreme quantities. COT is a gas chamber filled with tens of thousands of gold wires arranged in layers and argon gas. Two types of wires are used in the COT: sense wires and field wires. Sense wires are thinner and attract the electrons that are released by the argon gas as it is ionized. The field wires are thicker than the sense wires and attract the positive ions formed from the release of electrons. There are 96 layers of wire and each wire is placed approximately 3.86 mm apart from one another. As in the silicon detector, when a charged particle passes through the chamber it ionizes the gas. This signal is then carried to a nearby wire, which is then carried to the computers for read-out. The COT is approximately 3.1 m long and extends from r = 40 cm to r = 137 cm. Although the COT is not nearly as precise as the silicon detector, the COT has a hit position resolution of 140 μm and a momentum resolution of 0.0015 (GeV/c)^{−1}.

=== Layer 4: solenoid magnet ===
The solenoid magnet surrounds both the COT and the silicon detector. The purpose of the solenoid is to bend the trajectory of charged particles in the COT and silicon detector by creating a magnetic field parallel to the beam. The solenoid has a radius of r = 1.5 m and is 4.8 m in length. The curvature of the trajectory of the particles in the magnet field allows physicists to calculate the momentum of each of the particles. The higher the curvature, the lower the momentum and vice versa. Because the particles have such a high energy, a very strong magnet is needed to bend the paths of the particles. The solenoid is a superconducting magnet cooled by liquid helium. The helium lowers the temperature of the magnet to 4.7 K or −268.45 °C which reduces the resistance to almost zero, allowing the magnet to conduct high currents with minimal heating and very high efficiency, and creating a powerful magnetic field.

=== Layers 5 and 6: electromagnetic and hadronic calorimeters ===
Calorimeters quantify the total energy of the particles by converting the energy of particles to visible light though polystyrene scintillators. CDF uses two types of calorimeters: electromagnetic calorimeters and hadronic calorimeters. The electromagnetic calorimeter measures the energy of light particles and the hadronic calorimeter measures the energy of hadrons. The central electromagnetic calorimeter uses alternating sheets of lead and scintillator. Each layer of lead is approximately 20 mm (3/4 in) wide. The lead is used to stop the particles as they pass through the calorimeter and the scintillator is used to quantify the energy of the particles. The hadronic calorimeter works in much the same way except the hadronic calorimeter uses steel in place of lead. Each calorimeter forms a wedge, which consists of both an electromagnetic calorimeter and a hadronic calorimeter. These wedges are about 2.4 m (8 ft) in length and are arranged around the solenoid.

=== Layer 7: muon detectors ===
The final "layer" of the detector consists of the muon detectors. Muons are charged particles that may be produced when heavy particles decay. These high-energy particles hardly interact so the muon detectors are strategically placed at the farthest layer from the beam pipe behind large walls of steel. The steel ensures that only extremely high-energy particles, such as neutrinos and muons, pass through to the muon chambers. There are two aspects of the muon detectors: the planar drift chambers and scintillators. There are four layers of planar drift chambers, each with the capability of detecting muons with a transverse momentum p_{T} > 1.4 GeV/c. These drift chambers work in the same way as the COT. They are filled with gas and wire. The charged muons ionize the gas and the signal is carried to readout by the wires.

=== Conclusion ===
Understanding the different components of the detector is important because the detector determines what data will look like and what signal one can expect to see for each particle. A detector is basically a set of obstacles used to force particles to interact, allowing physicists to "see" the presence of a certain particle. If a charged quark is passing through the detector, the evidence of this quark will be a curved trajectory in the silicon detector and COT deposited energy in the calorimeter. If a neutral particle, such as a neutron, passes through the detector, there will be no track in the COT and silicon detector but deposited energy in the hadronic calorimeter. Muons may appear in the COT and silicon detector and as deposited energy in the muon detectors. Likewise, a neutrino, which rarely if ever interacts, will express itself only in the form of missing energy.
