= 4Pi =

4Pi may refer to:

- IBM System/4 Pi, a family of avionics computers
- 4Pi microscope, a microscope that uses interference and fluorescence computers
- 4×π = 12.56637..., the solid angle of a complete sphere measured in steradians
- Hermetic detector (also called a 4π detector)
