= Tollestrup =

Tollestrup is a surname. Notable people with the surname include:

- Alvin V. Tollestrup (1924–2020), American physicist
- Phil Tollestrup (born 1949), Canadian basketball player and Olympian
