= Mark I (detector) =

The Mark I, also known as the SLAC-LBL Magnetic Detector, was a particle detector that operated at the interaction point of the SPEAR collider from 1973 to 1977. It was the first 4π detector, i.e. the first detector to uniformly cover as much of the 4π steradians (units of solid angle) around the interaction point as possible with different types of component particle detectors arranged in layers. This design proved quite successful, and the detector was used in discoveries of the J/ψ particle and tau lepton, which both resulted in Nobel Prizes (for Burton Richter in 1976 and Martin Lewis Perl in 1995). This basic design philosophy continues to be used in all modern collider detectors.

== Details of the detector ==
The detector was enormous for the early 1970's, weighing in at ~150 tons, with a length of 12 feet and a height of 20 feet. The colliding electron and positron beams were contained within a vacuum chamber of about 6 inches in diameter. The beam pipe was constructed from a very thin (0.008 inch) corrugated stainless steel tube. The two counter-rotating beams were collided at the center of the detector.

A solenoid coil generated a magnetic field roughly parallel to the beam direction, which enabled measurement of the transverse momentum of particles emerging from the collision point.

The steel flux return was constructed from 8 pieces of steel arranged in an octagon around the detector; and two removable steel end caps, one at each end of the detector. Construction of the original detector, designed by Bill-Davies White, took about a year, and was completed in 1973.

The original detector consisted of a series of components in cylindrical layers.

=== Inner Trigger Scintillation Counters ===
Four inner trigger scintillation counters were positioned around the beam pipe. Charged particles traversing these counters generated light pulses, detected by photo-multiplier tubes and associated electronics.

=== Multi-Wire Proportional Chambers ===
SLAC collaborators developed the MWPC system.

=== Cylindrical Wire Spark Chambers ===
There were 4 concentric sets of electronic read-out wire spark chambers. Design and construction of these detectors were overseen by Roy Schwitters of the SLAC collaboration

=== Outer Trigger Counters ===
Sandwiched between the outermost cylindrical wire chamber and the magnetic coil were 48 scintillation counters. Again, light pulses generated by the passage of charged particles traversing these counters were detected by photo-multiplier tubes at each end and associated electronics. Time-of-arrival of the pulse was also recorded for each photomultiplier.

=== Magnet Coil ===
A solenoid coil was powered with DC current to produce a .4 T (check) magnetic field, to bend charged particles in the plane perpendicular to the beam. This made it possible to detect tracks in three dimensions, and measure charged particles, to determine if they originated from the interaction region of the beam pipe.

=== Lead-Scintillator Shower Detectors ===
Just outside of the magnet coil were 24 shower counter. Each counter was roughly 4 feet wide by 12 feet long. 10 plates of .25 inch lead were alternated with 10 plastic scintillators.

Electrons or photons passing through this sandwich detector produced electromagnetic cascade showers.

Light pulses from the scintillator plates were guided to a photomultiplier tube at each end, using plastic (lucite) light guides.

These counters, plus one spare, were designed and constructed at LBL, and transported to SLAC.

=== Iron Flux Return ===
Eight 8 inch (25 cm) iron plates, plus two endcap steel pieces, completed the magnetic flux return path. The eight iron plates form an octagon.
