= Chung-Yao Chao =

Chinese physicist (1902–1998)

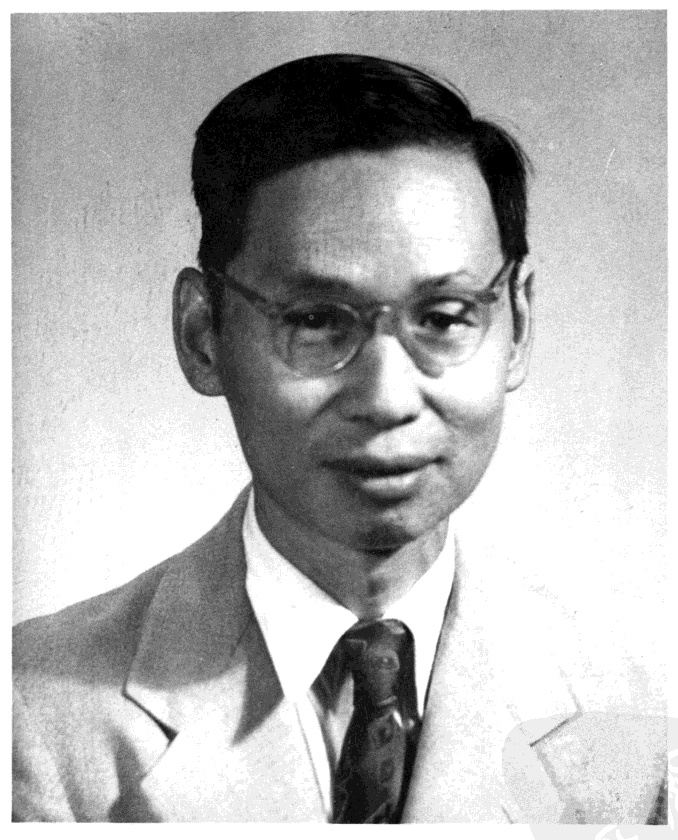
- Born: 27 June 1902; Zhuji, China
- Died: 28 May 1998 (aged 95); Beijing, China
- Education: Southeast University; National Central University Nanjing University; California Institute of Technology
- Known for: Seminal contributions to the discovery of antimatter
- Scientific career
- Fields: Physics
- Workplaces: Southeast University; National Central University; Nanjing University; National Southwestern Associated University; University of Science and Technology of China

Chung-Yao Chao (Chinese: 赵忠尧; pinyin: Zhào Zhōngyáo; 27 June 1902 – 28 May 1998) was a Chinese theoretical physicist. He studied the scattering of gamma rays in lead by pair production in 1930, without knowing that positrons were involved in the anomalously high scattering cross-section. When the positron was discovered by Carl David Anderson in 1932, confirming the existence of Paul Dirac's "antimatter", it became clear that positrons could explain Chung-Yao Chao's earlier experiments, with the gamma rays being emitted from electron-positron annihilation.

He entered Nanjing Higher Normal School (later renamed National Southeastern University, National Central University and Nanjing University), in 1920 and earned a BS in physics in 1925. Then he earned a PhD degree in physics under supervision of Nobel Prize laureate Robert Andrews Millikan at California Institute of Technology in 1930. Later he went back to China and joined the physics faculty of Tsinghua University in Beijing.

== Nobel Prize controversy ==
The 1936 Nobel Prize for Physics went to Carl D. Anderson for the discovery of the positron. While a graduate student at Caltech in 1930, Chao was the first to experimentally identify positrons through electron–positron annihilation, but did not realize what they were. Anderson, Chao's classmate at Caltech, used the same radioactive source, ^{208}Tl, as Chao. (Historically, ^{208}Tl was known as "thorium C double prime" or "ThC", see decay chains.) Fifty years later, Anderson admitted that Chao had inspired his discovery: Chao's research formed the foundation from which much of Anderson's own work developed. Chao died in 1998, without sharing in a Nobel Prize acknowledgment.
