= Carl David Anderson =

American physicist (1905–1991)

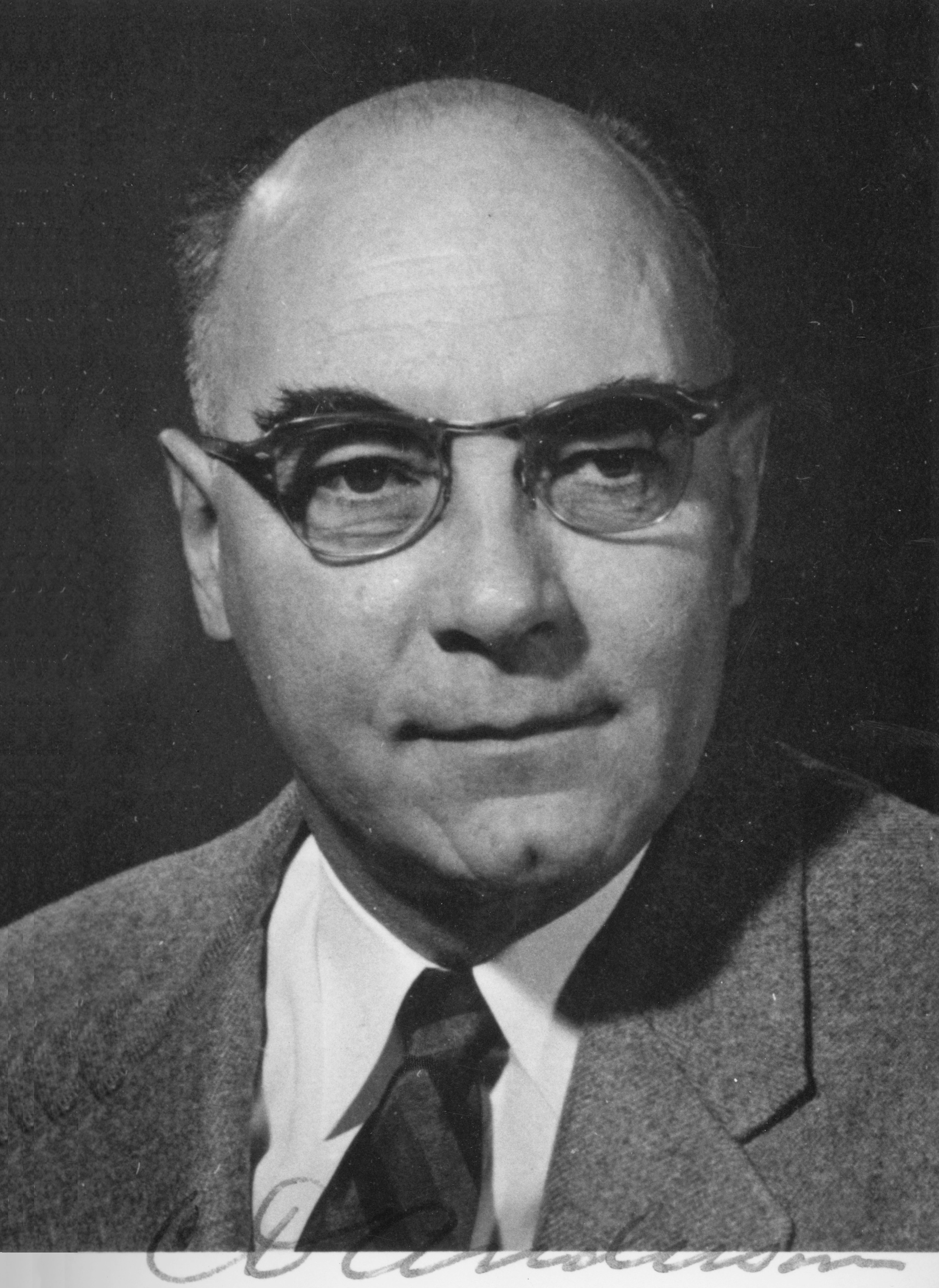
- Born: September 3, 1905; New York City, U.S.
- Died: January 11, 1991 (aged 85); San Marino, California, U.S.
- Resting place: Forest Lawn Memorial Park
- Education: California Institute of Technology (BS, PhD)
- Known for: Discovery of the positron; Discovery of the muon
- Spouse: Lorraine Bergman (m. 1946)
- Children: 2
- Awards: Nobel Prize in Physics (1936); Elliott Cresson Medal (1937)
- Scientific career
- Fields: Physics
- Workplaces: California Institute of Technology
- Thesis: Space-Distribution of X-Ray Photoelectrons Ejected from the K and L Atomic Energy-Levels (1930)
- Doctoral advisor: Robert Millikan
- Doctoral students: James C. Fletcher; Donald Glaser; Leon Katz; Seth Neddermeyer; Carl A. Rouse; George Trilling

Carl David Anderson (September 3, 1905 – January 11, 1991) was an American experimental physicist who shared the 1936 Nobel Prize in Physics with Victor Hess for his discovery of the positron, which confirmed the existence of antimatter.

== Biography ==
Carl David Anderson was born on September 3, 1905, in New York City, to Swedish immigrants, Emma Adolfina (née Ajaxson) and Carl David Anderson. He received a Bachelor of Science in Physics and Engineering in 1927 and a Doctor of Philosophy in Physics in 1930, both from the California Institute of Technology (Caltech).

In 1930, Anderson became a Research Fellow at Caltech, where he was appointed Professor of Physics in 1933, a position he held until his retirement in 1976. He was also Chairman of the Division of Physics, Mathematics and Astronomy from 1962 to 1970.

In 1946, Anderson married Lorraine Bergman, with whom he had two sons.

Anderson died on January 11, 1991, in San Marino, California, at the age of 85. His remains were interred in the Forest Lawn Memorial Park in Los Angeles. He was a Christian.

== Research ==
=== Discovery of the positron ===
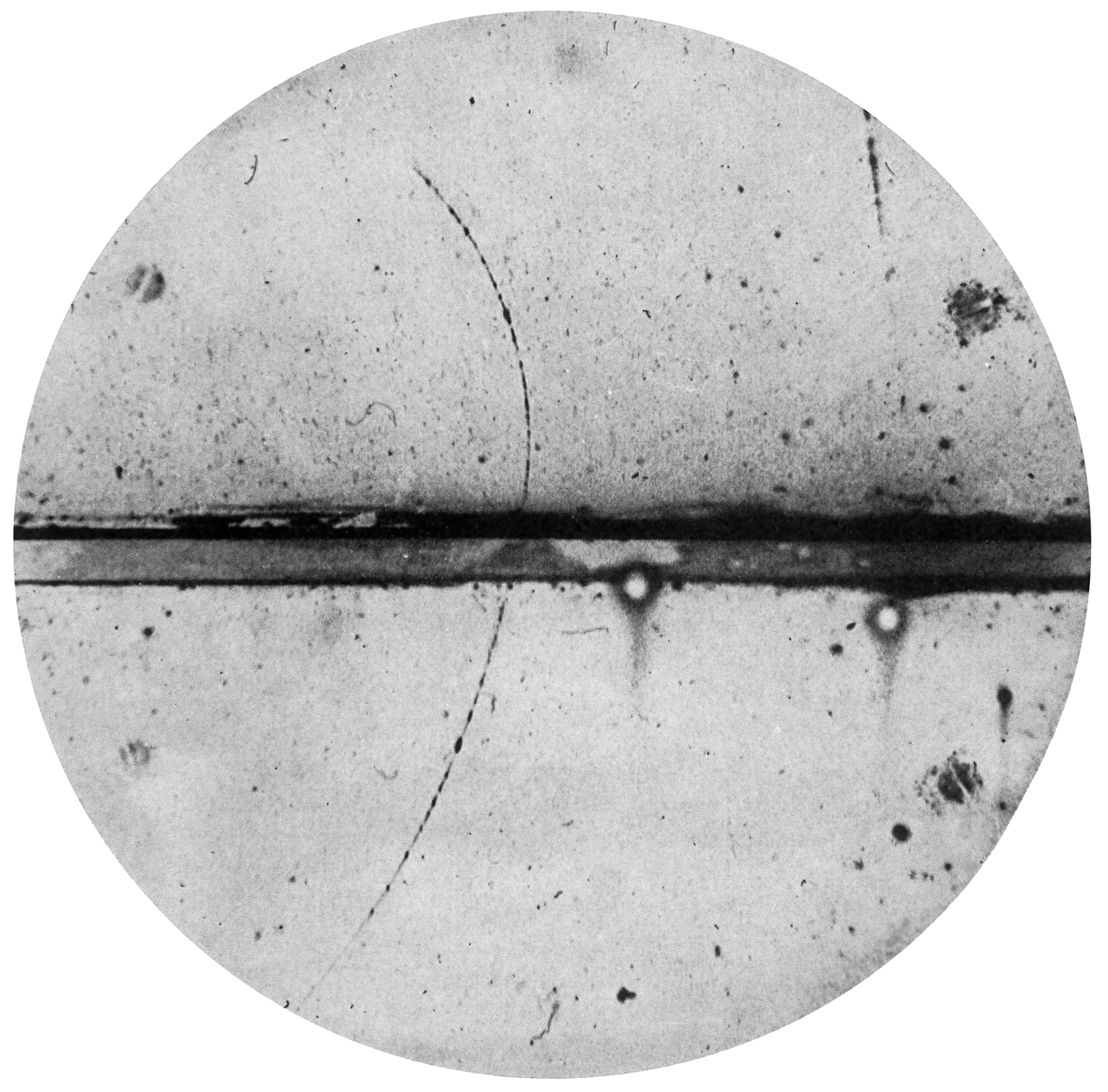
Photo by Anderson of the first positron ever observed, March 15, 1933

Under the supervision of Robert Millikan, Anderson began investigations into cosmic rays during the course of which he encountered unexpected particle tracks in his (modern versions now commonly referred to as an Anderson) cloud chamber photographs that he correctly interpreted as having been created by a particle with the same mass as the electron, but with opposite electric charge.

This discovery, announced in 1932 and later confirmed by others, validated Paul Dirac's theoretical prediction of the existence of the positron. Anderson first detected the particles in cosmic rays. He then produced more conclusive proof by shooting gamma rays produced by the natural radioactive nuclide ThC'' (^{208}Tl) into other materials, resulting in the creation of positron-electron pairs.

For this work, Anderson shared the 1936 Nobel Prize in Physics with Victor Hess. Fifty years later, Anderson acknowledged that his discovery was inspired by the work of his Caltech classmate, Chung-Yao Chao, whose research formed the foundation from which much of Anderson's work developed but was not credited at the time.

=== Discovery of the muon ===
In 1936, Anderson and his first graduate student, Seth Neddermeyer, discovered the muon (or 'mu-meson', as it was known for many years), a subatomic particle 207 times more massive than the electron, but with the same negative electric charge and spin 1/2 as the electron, again in cosmic rays.

Anderson and Neddermeyer at first believed that they had seen a pion, a particle which Hideki Yukawa had postulated in his theory of the strong interaction. When it became clear that what Anderson had seen was not the pion, the physicist I. I. Rabi, puzzled as to how the unexpected discovery could fit into any logical scheme of particle physics, quizzically asked "Who ordered that?" (sometimes the story goes that he was dining with colleagues at a Chinese restaurant at the time).

The muon was the first of a long list of subatomic particles whose discovery initially baffled theoreticians who could not make the confusing "zoo" fit into some tidy conceptual scheme. Willis Lamb, in his 1955 Nobel Prize Lecture, joked that he had heard it said that "the finder of a new elementary particle used to be rewarded by a Nobel Prize, but such a discovery now ought to be punished by a 10,000 dollar fine."

== Recognition ==
=== Awards ===
Year	Organization	Award	Citation	Ref.
1936	Royal Swedish Academy of Sciences	Nobel Prize in Physics	"For his discovery of the positron."	
1937	Franklin Institute	Elliott Cresson Medal	"For the discovery of the positron."	

=== Memberships ===
Year	Organization	Type	Ref.
1938	American Philosophical Society	Member	
1938	National Academy of Sciences	Emeritus	
1950	American Academy of Arts and Sciences	Member	

== Select publications ==
- Anderson, C. D. (1933). "The Positive Electron". Physical Review. 43 (6): 491–494. Bibcode:1933PhRv...43..491A. doi:10.1103/PhysRev.43.491.
- Anderson, C. D. (1932). "The Apparent Existence of Easily Deflectable Positives". Science. 76 (1967): 238–9. Bibcode:1932Sci....76..238A. doi:10.1126/science.76.1967.238. PMID 17731542.
- Anderson, C. D. (technical advisor) (1957). The Strange Case of the Cosmic Rays. The Bell Laboratory Science Series.
