= Stephane Willocq =

American physicist

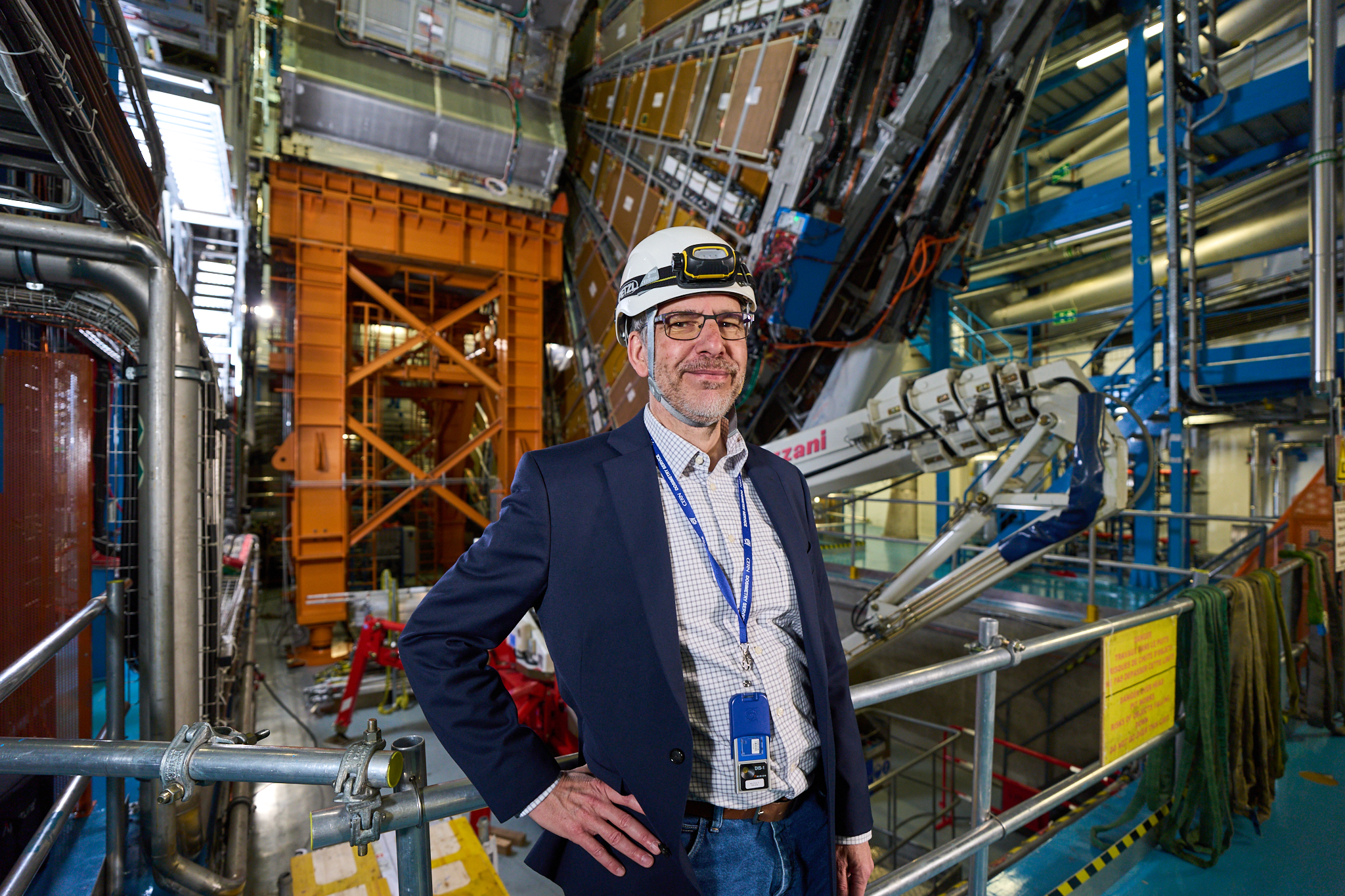
- Born: Brussels

Academic background
- Education: BS, Université libre de Bruxelles; Ph.D., 1992, Tufts University
- Thesis: Coherent production of pions and rho mesons in neutrino charged current interactions on neon nuclei at the Fermilab Tevatron (1992)

Academic work
- Institutions: University of Massachusetts Amherst

Stéphane Willocq is an American physicist. He is a professor of physics at the University of Massachusetts Amherst and is involved in the upgrade of the muon trigger with MDT chambers for the high luminosity Large Hadron Collider.

== Early life and education ==
Willocq completed his bachelor's degree in physics degree from the Université libre de Bruxelles before traveling to the United States to enroll at Tufts University. He had originally intended to remain in Brussels but funding difficulties forced him to spend a year working on his neutrino experiment as a visiting scientist at Fermilab. Notably, in the early 1980s, Stephane played in the band Isolation Ward, which recorded two singles for Les Disques Du Crépuscule .

== Career ==
Upon joining the faculty at the University of Massachusetts Amherst, Willocq began working on different aspects of the ATLAS experiment full time since 2004. As an associate professor, Willocq served as the software coordinator and a member of the steering group for the ATLAS Muon Spectrometer. In 2009, he collaborated with colleagues to run experiments to collect data on fundamental atomic particles in the hopes that it would reveal new states of matter and unveil the secrets of dark matter. His work was recognized by the European Organization for Nuclear Research in 2012 after he co-wrote large parts of the code used to reconstruct the trajectories of muons detected in the ATLAS Muon Spectrometer.

In October 2016, Willocq was elected a Fellow of the American Physical Society for "contributions to the physics of heavy flavor in electron-positron collisions; searches for new vector bosons in proton-proton collisions at the highest energies at the Large Hadron Collider; and for exceptional leadership of the exotic physics and technical groups during the first data-collection with the ATLAS experiment." He was also elected to serve on the ATLAS' experiments publications committee chair from 2016 until 2018. During the COVID-19 pandemic, Willocq received funding from the United States Department of Energy "to advance knowledge of how the universe works at its most fundamental level." He was also promoted from Deputy to Lead Physics Coordinator.

From 2023-2023, Willocq served as deputy spokesperson of the ATLAS experiment, after which he was elected ATLAS spokesperson for the period 2025-2027.
