= Event reconstruction =

In a particle detector experiment, event reconstruction is the process of interpreting the electronic signals produced by the detector to determine the original particles that passed through, their momenta, directions, and the primary vertex of the event. Thus the initial physical process (for instance, that occurred at the interaction point of the particle accelerator), whose study is the ultimate goal of the experiment, can be determined. The total event reconstruction is not always possible and necessary; in some cases, only a part of the data described above is obtained and processed.
