= Donald Glaser =

American physicist and biologist (1926–2013)

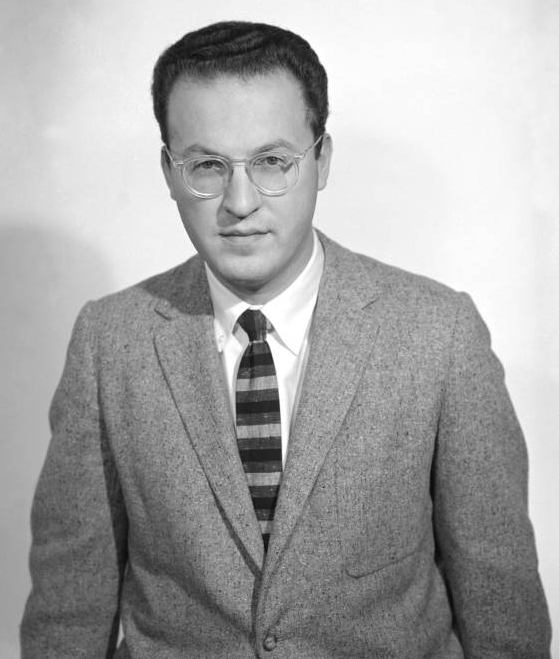
- Glaser in 1960
- Born: Donald Arthur Glaser; September 21, 1926; Cleveland, Ohio, US
- Died: February 28, 2013 (aged 86); Berkeley, California, US
- Education: Case School of Applied Science (BS); California Institute of Technology (PhD)
- Known for: Inventing the bubble chamber (1952)
- Awards: Nobel Prize in Physics (1960); Elliott Cresson Medal (1961)
- Scientific career
- Fields: Molecular biology; Particle physics
- Workplaces: University of Michigan (1949–59); University of California, Berkeley (from 1959)
- Thesis: The Momentum Distribution of Charged Cosmic Ray Particles Near Sea Level (1950)
- Doctoral advisor: Carl David Anderson
- Notable students: Martin Perl

Donald Arthur Glaser (September 21, 1926 – February 28, 2013) was an American physicist and biologist who received the Nobel Prize in Physics in 1960 for his invention of the bubble chamber.

== Personal life ==
Donald Arthur Glaser was born on September 21, 1926, in Cleveland, Ohio, to Russian Jewish immigrants, Lena and William J. Glaser, a businessman. He enjoyed music and played the piano, violin, and viola. He went to Cleveland Heights High School, where he became interested in physics as a means to understand the physical world. He died in his sleep at the age of 86 on February 28, 2013, in Berkeley, California.

== Education and career ==
Glaser attended Case School of Applied Science (now Case Western Reserve University), where he completed his Bachelor of Science degree in physics and mathematics in 1946. During the course of his education there, he became especially interested in particle physics. He played viola in the Cleveland Philharmonic while at Case, and taught mathematics classes at the college after graduation. He continued on to the California Institute of Technology (Caltech), where he pursued his PhD in physics. His interest in particle physics led him to work with Nobel laureate Carl David Anderson, studying cosmic rays with cloud chambers. He preferred the accessibility of cosmic ray research over that of nuclear physics. While at Caltech he learned to design and build the equipment he needed for his experiments, and this skill would prove to be useful throughout his career. He also attended molecular genetics seminars led by Nobel laureate Max Delbrück; he would return to this field later. Glaser completed his doctoral thesis, The Momentum Distribution of Charged Cosmic Ray Particles Near Sea Level, after starting as an instructor at the University of Michigan in 1949. He received his PhD from Caltech in 1950, and he was promoted to professor at Michigan in 1957 He joined the faculty of UC Berkeley in 1959 as a professor of physics. During this time, his research concerned short-lived elementary particles. The bubble chamber enabled him to observe the paths and lifetimes of the particles. Starting in 1962, Glaser changed his field of research to molecular biology, starting with a project on ultraviolet-induced cancer. In 1964, he was given the additional title of professor of molecular biology. Glaser's position (since 1989) was professor of physics and neurobiology in the graduate school.

== Bubble chamber ==
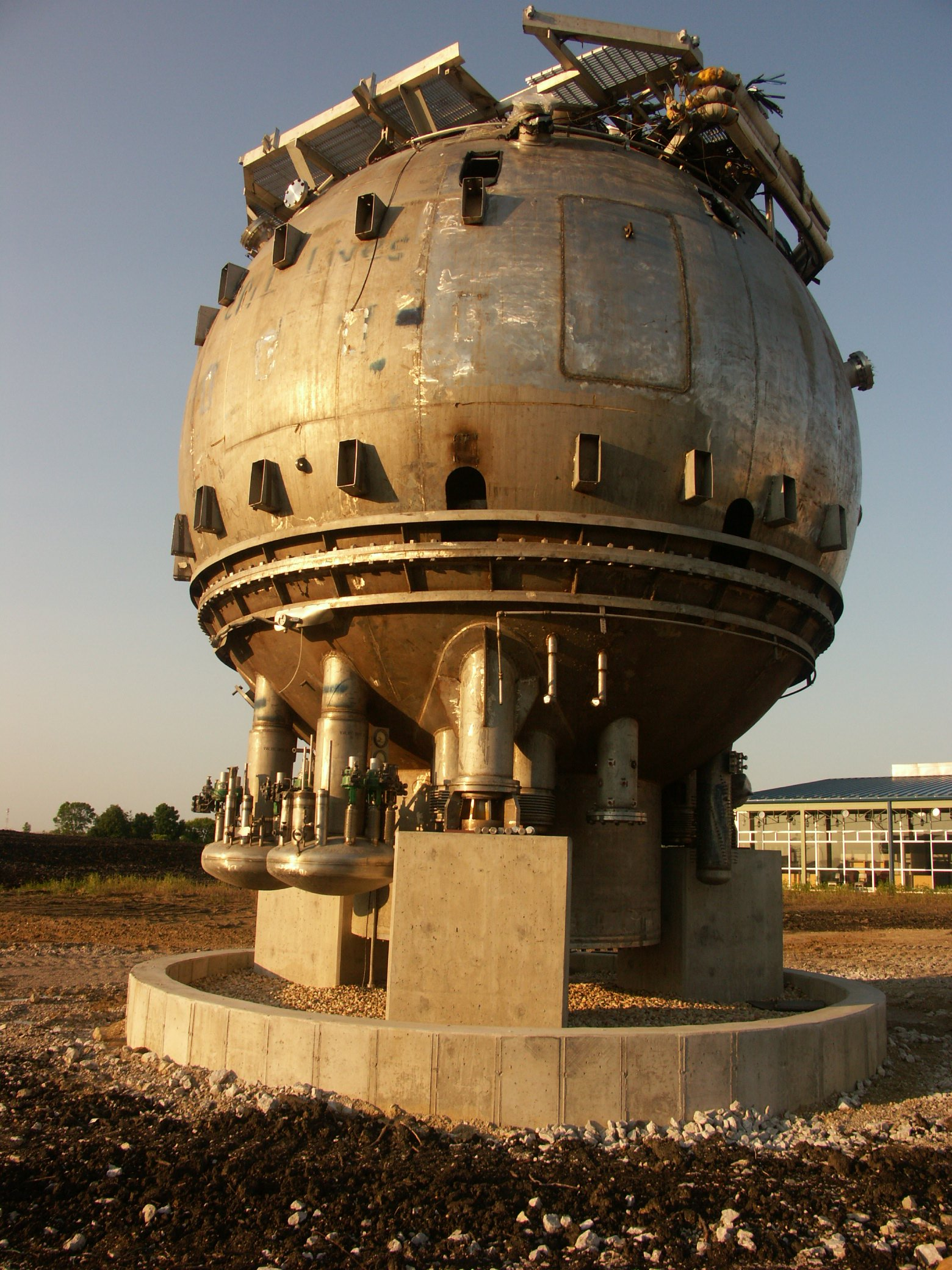
A bubble chamber

While teaching at Michigan, Glaser began to work on experiments that led to the creation of the bubble chamber. His experience with cloud chambers at Caltech had shown him that they were inadequate for studying elementary particles. In a cloud chamber, particles pass through gas and collide with metal plates that obscure the scientists' view of the event. The cloud chamber also needs time to reset between recording events and cannot keep up with accelerators' rate of particle production.

He experimented with using superheated liquid in a glass chamber. Charged particles would leave a track of bubbles as they passed through the liquid, and their tracks could be photographed. He created the first bubble chamber with ether. He experimented with hydrogen while visiting the University of Chicago, showing that hydrogen would also work in the chamber.

It has often been claimed that Glaser was inspired to his invention by the bubbles in a glass of beer; however, in a 2006 talk, he refuted this story, saying that although beer was not the inspiration for the bubble chamber, he did experiments using beer to fill early prototypes.

His new invention was ideal for use with high-energy accelerators, so Glaser traveled to Brookhaven National Laboratory with some students to study elementary particles using the accelerator there. The images that he created with his bubble chamber brought recognition of the importance of his device, and he was able to get funding to continue experimenting with larger chambers. Glaser was then recruited by Nobel laureate Luis Alvarez, who was working on a hydrogen bubble chamber at the University of California at Berkeley. Glaser accepted an offer to become a professor of physics there in 1959.

== Nobel Prize ==
Glaser was awarded the 1960 Nobel Prize for Physics for the invention of the bubble chamber. His invention allowed scientists to observe what happens to high-energy beams from an accelerator, thus paving the way for many important discoveries.

== Other awards and honors ==
- Elliott Cresson Medal (1961)
- Elected to the National Academy of Sciences (1962)
- Golden Plate Award of the American Academy of Achievement (1989)
- Elected to the American Philosophical Society (1997)
- Elected to the American Academy of Arts and Sciences (2003)

== Transition to molecular biology ==
After winning the Nobel Prize, Glaser began to think about switching from physics into a new field. He wanted to concentrate on science, and found that as the experiments and equipment grew larger in scale and cost, he was doing more administrative work. He also anticipated that the ever-more-complex equipment would cause consolidation into fewer sites and would require more travel for physicists working in high-energy physics. Recalling his interest in molecular genetics that began at Caltech, Glaser began to study biology. He spent a semester at MIT as a visiting professor and attended biology seminars there, and also spent a semester at Copenhagen with Ole Maaloe, the prominent Danish molecular biologist.

Glazer told his business colleagues at Cetus that after winning the Nobel prize he decided he had spent the first part of his life studying the physical world and that he now wanted to study the basis of life itself so he changed to studying biology and genetics. He made the comment "As a physicist and highly trained engineer my immediate thought upon entering my first biology lab was that Louis Pasteur would be comfortable working there." He then went on to develop equipment to automate various biological processes. In fact, Cetus was originally formed to utilize his inventions and expertise with its first projects focused on producing higher yielding antibiotic strains as the company then evolved, pioneering the field of biotechnology.

He worked in UC Berkeley's Virus Lab (now the Biochemistry and Virus Laboratory), doing experiments with bacterial phages, bacteria, and mammalian cells. He studied the development of cancer cells, in particular the skin cancer xeroderma pigmentosum. As with the bubble chamber, he used his experience designing equipment to improve the experimental process. He automated the process of pouring out agar, spreading culture, and counting colonies of cells using a machine he called the dumbwaiter. It took photographs, administered chemicals, and had a mechanical hand to pick up colonies.

== Commercial ventures ==
While continuing to work at UC Berkeley, Glaser started Berkeley Scientific Laboratory with Bill Wattenberg in 1968. The short-lived partnership worked on automating diagnostic procedures.

In 1971 he founded Cetus Corporation with Moshe Alafi, Ron Cape, and Peter Farley. Glaser's position was chairman of the science advisory board. The founders felt that the knowledge scientists had gained about DNA had not yet been applied to solve real problems. The company did microbial strain improvement, and then genetic engineering, becoming the first biotechnology company. Cetus was purchased by Chiron Corporation in 1991.

== Transition to neurobiology ==
As molecular biology became more dependent on biochemistry, Glaser again considered a career change. His experience automating visual tasks in physics and molecular biology led him to an interest in human vision and how the brain processes what is seen. He began to work on computational modeling of the visual system and visual psychophysics, and spent a sabbatical at the Rowland Institute for Science.

== See also ==
- List of Jewish Nobel laureates
