= Burton Richter =

American physicist

- Richter in 1976
- Born: March 22, 1931; Brooklyn, New York, U.S.
- Died: July 18, 2018 (aged 87); Stanford, California, U.S.
- Education: MIT
- Known for: J/ψ meson
- Spouse: Laurose Becker (m. 1960; 2 children)
- Awards: E. O. Lawrence Award (1975); Nobel Prize in Physics (1976); Enrico Fermi Award (2012); National Medal of Science (2012)
- Scientific career
- Workplaces: Stanford University; Stanford Linear Accelerator Center
- Doctoral advisor: Bernard T. Feld

Burton Richter (March 22, 1931 – July 18, 2018) was an American physicist. He led the Stanford Linear Accelerator Center (SLAC) team which co-discovered the J/ψ meson in 1974, alongside the Brookhaven National Laboratory (BNL) team led by Samuel Ting for which they won the Nobel Prize for Physics in 1976. This discovery was part of the November Revolution of particle physics. He was the SLAC director from 1984 to 1999.

== Life and work ==
A native of New York City, Richter was born into a Jewish family in Brooklyn, and was raised in the Queens neighborhood of Far Rockaway. His parents were Fanny (Pollack) and Abraham Richter, a textile worker. He graduated from Far Rockaway High School, a school that also produced fellow laureates Baruch Samuel Blumberg and Richard Feynman. He attended Mercersburg Academy in Pennsylvania, then continued on to study at the Massachusetts Institute of Technology, where he received his bachelor's degree in 1952 and his PhD in 1956. He then joined the faculty of Stanford University, becoming a full professor in 1967. Richter was director of the Stanford Linear Accelerator Center (SLAC) from 1984 to 1999. He was a senior fellow of the Freeman Spogli Institute for International Studies and Paul Pigott Professor in the Physical Sciences Emeritus of Stanford University.

As a professor at Stanford, Richter designed the SPEAR (Stanford Positron-Electron Asymmetric Ring) particle accelerator with the help of another Stanford physics professor, David Ritson. When eventually resources were secured, Richter led the building of SPEAR, with the support of the U.S. Atomic Energy Commission. With it he led a team that discovered a new subatomic particle he called a ψ (psi). This discovery was also made by the team led by Samuel Ting at Brookhaven National Laboratory, but he called the particle J. The particle thus became known as the J/ψ meson. Richter and Ting were jointly awarded the 1976 Nobel Prize in Physics for their work.

During 1975 Richter spent a sabbatical year at CERN where he worked on the ISR experiment R702.

In 1987, Richter received the Golden Plate Award of the American Academy of Achievement.

Richter was a member of the JASON advisory group and served on the board of directors of Scientists and Engineers for America, an organization focused on promoting sound science in American government.

Richter was elected to the American Philosophical Society in 2003.

In May 2007, he visited Iran and Sharif University of Technology.

Richter is one of the 20 American recipients of the Nobel Prize in Physics to sign a letter addressed to President George W. Bush in May 2008, urging him to "reverse the damage done to basic science research in the Fiscal Year 2008 Omnibus Appropriations Bill" by requesting additional emergency funding for the Department of Energy's Office of Science, the National Science Foundation, and the National Institute of Standards and Technology.

In 2012, President Barack Obama announced that Burton Richter was a co-recipient of the Enrico Fermi Award, along with Mildred Dresselhaus.

In 2014, President Obama also awarded Richter the 2012 National Medal of Science. His citation read, "For pioneering contributions to the development of electron accelerators, including circular and linear colliders, synchrotron light sources, and for discoveries in elementary particle physics and contributions to energy policy."

In 2013, Richter commented on an open letter from Tom Wigley, Kerry Emanuel, Ken Caldeira, and James Hansen, that Angela Merkel was "wrong to shut down nuclear".

In 2014, Richter was among the residents of a continuing care retirement center who filed an unsuccessful lawsuit against a continuing care retirement home's financial practices.

Richter died on July 18, 2018, in Stanford, California, at the age 87.

== See also ==
- List of Jewish Nobel laureates
- List of independent discoveries

== Publications ==
- Barber, W. C.; Richter, B.; Panofsky, W. K. H.; O'Neill, G. K. & B. Gittelman. "An Experiment on the Limits of Quantum Electro-dynamics", High-Energy Physics Laboratory at Stanford University, Princeton University, United States Department of Energy (through predecessor agency the Atomic Energy Commission), Office of Naval Research, (June 1959).
- Richter, B. "Design Considerations for High Energy Electron – Positron Storage Rings", Stanford Linear Accelerator Center, Stanford University, United States Department of Energy (through predecessor agency the Atomic Energy Commission), (November 1966).
- Boyarski, A. M.; Coward, D.; Ecklund, S.; Richter, B.; Sherden, D.; Siemann, R. & C. Sinclair. "Inclusive Yields of pi{sup +}, pi{sup -}, K{sup +}, and K{sup -} from H{sub 2} Photoproduced at 18 GeV at Forward Angles", Stanford Linear Accelerator Center, Stanford University, United States Department of Energy (through predecessor agency the Atomic Energy Commission), (1971).
- Richter, B. "Total Hadron Cross Section, New Particles, and Muon Electron Events in e{sup +}e{sup -} Annihilation at SPEAR", Stanford Linear Accelerator Center, Stanford University, United States Department of Energy (through predecessor agency the U.S. Energy Research and Development Administration (ERDA)), (January 1976).
- Richter, B. "Forty-five Years of e{sup +}e{sup -} Annihilation Physics: 1956 to 2001", Stanford Linear Accelerator Center, United States Department of Energy, (August 1984).
- Richter, B. "Charting the Course for Elementary Particle Physics", Stanford Linear Accelerator Center, United States Department of Energy, (February 16, 2007).
- Richter, B. Beyond Smoke and Mirrors: Climate Changes and Energy in the 21st Century. Second Edition. Cambridge University Press, 2014. ISBN 978-1-107-67372-4

Preceded by Wolfgang Panofsky	SLAC Director; 1984–1999	Succeeded by Jonathan M. Dorfan
