= Alvin V. Tollestrup =

American physicist (1924–2020)

Alvin Tollestrup
- Born: Alvin Virgil Tollestrup; March 22, 1924; Los Angeles, California, U.S.
- Died: February 9, 2020 (aged 95)
- Education: University of Utah; California Institute of Technology
- Known for: Development of magnets for the Tevatron, founding role in CDF
- Awards: National Medal of Technology
- Scientific career
- Fields: Physics
- Workplaces: California Institute of Technology; Fermilab
- Doctoral advisor: William Alfred Fowler

Alvin Virgil Tollestrup (March 22, 1924 – February 9, 2020) was an American high-energy particle physicist best known for his key roles in the development of the superconducting magnets for Fermilab's Tevatron and the formation of CDF.

== Biography ==
Alvin Tollestrup was born in Los Angeles, California, on March 22, 1924. He received a BS in engineering from the University of Utah in 1944. After graduating, he served in the U.S. Navy, where he studied and installed radar systems. After he was discharged, he entered the California Institute of Technology in 1946, where he worked with William Alfred Fowler and Charles Christian Lauritsen. He received his PhD in 1950. He remained at Caltech as a research fellow, eventually becoming an assistant professor of physics in 1953 and later a full professor.

Tollestrup visited the European Organization for Nuclear Research (CERN) in 1957/58 with a fellowship from the National Science Foundation.

Tollestrup went to Fermilab on sabbatical in April 1975, intending to spend nine months at the lab. At the lab, he learned of Fermilab director Robert R. Wilson's plans to build a superconducting accelerator, which would come to be called the Tevatron. Tollestrup began working with the group developing the superconducting magnets for the accelerator. As plans for the Tevatron progressed, Tollestrup was also involved in forming a group to study the experimental possibilities opened by the collider, a group which eventually became CDF. Caltech extended his sabbatical to two years as he worked on these projects, but in 1977 Tollestrup had to choose whether to return to Caltech or remain at Fermilab. He decided to stay at Fermilab, where he continued to work on the development of the Tevatron, CDF, and Fermilab's colliding beams program. He won the National Medal of Technology in 1989 for his work on the design, testing, and commissioning of the Tevatron's superconducting magnets, which was the first large-scale application of superconductivity. He died on February 9, 2020, at the age of 95.
