= Missing energy =

In experimental particle physics, missing energy refers to energy that is not detected in a particle detector, but is output due to the laws of conservation of energy and conservation of momentum. Missing energy is carried by particles that do not interact with the electromagnetic or strong forces and thus are not easily detectable, most notably neutrinos. In general, missing energy is used to infer the presence of non-detectable particles and is expected to be a signature of many theories of physics beyond the Standard Model.

The concept of missing energy is commonly applied in hadron colliders. The initial momentum of the colliding partons along the beam axis is not known — the energy of each hadron is split, and constantly exchanged, between its constituents — so the amount of total missing energy cannot be determined. However, the initial energy in particles traveling transverse to the beam axis is zero, so any net momentum in the transverse direction indicates missing transverse energy, also called missing E_{T} or MET.

Accurate measurements of missing energy are difficult, as they require full, accurate, energy reconstruction of all particles produced in an interaction.

Mismeasurement of particle energies can make it appear as if there is missing energy carried away by other particles when, in fact, no such particles were created.
