= Beam crossing =

Particle collision from opposite directions

A beam crossing in a particle collider occurs when two packets of particles, going in opposite directions, reach the same point in space. Most of the particles in each packet cross each other, but a few may collide, producing other particles that may be observed in a particle detector. In a linear collider there is only one location where beam crossings occur, while in a modern accelerator ring there are a few locations (LHC, for example, has four); it is at these points that detectors are placed.
