= SPEAR =

Coordinates: 37.41847°N 122.20116°W

SPEAR (originally Stanford Positron Electron Accelerating Ring) (Note: The original design consists of a single ring, an upgraded proposal for a pair of asymmetric rings did not receive enough funding and finally the acronym was kept as a simple name. Though the name Stanford Positron Electron Asymmetric Ring is also used in official sources.) was a particle physics collider at the SLAC National Accelerator Laboratory. It began running in 1972, colliding electrons and positrons with an energy of 3 GeV, and collecting data about the resulting particles with the Mark I detector. During the 1970s, experiments at the accelerator played a key role in particle physics research, including the discovery of the J/ψ meson (awarded the 1976 Nobel Prize in Physics), many charmonium states, and the discovery of the τ^{−} lepton (awarded the 1995 Nobel Prize in Physics).

After its use as a particle collider had been superseded, the facility built for SPEAR was converted to a dedicated synchrotron radiation source for the Stanford Synchrotron Radiation Lightsource (SSRL) beamlines, known as SPEAR2. A major upgrade of the ring completed in 2004 gave it the current name SPEAR3.
