= Interaction point =

Place where particles collide in an accelerator

In particle physics, an interaction point (IP) is the place where particles collide in an accelerator experiment. The nominal interaction point is the design position, which may differ from the real or physics interaction point, where the particles actually collide. A related, but distinct, concept is the primary vertex: the reconstructed location of an individual particle collision.

For fixed target experiments, the interaction point is the point where beam and target interact. For colliders, it is the place where the beams interact. Experiments (detectors) at particle accelerators are built around the nominal interaction points of the accelerators. The whole region around the interaction point (the experimental hall) is called an interaction region. Particle colliders such as LEP, HERA, RHIC, Tevatron and LHC can host several interaction regions and therefore several experiments taking advantage of the same beam.
