= Peter Jenni =

Swiss physicist (born 1948)

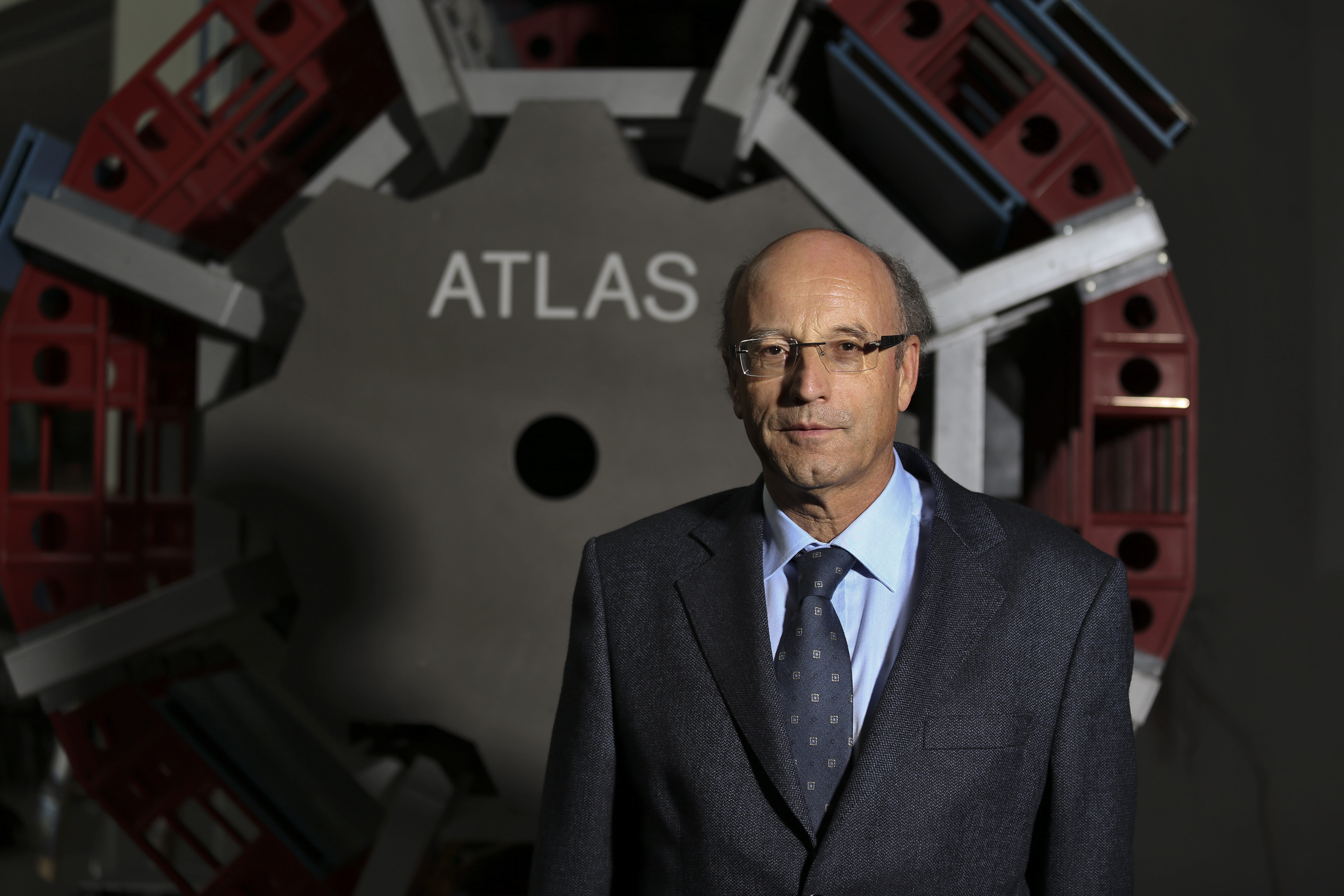
- Born: 17 April 1948 (age 78); Switzerland
- Education: Physics Diploma (28 June 1973) University of Bern; ETH-Zürich Doctorate in Physics (17 February 1976)
- Known for: Former Spokesperson of the ATLAS Collaboration
- Awards: 1998 Swiss Greinacher Prize; 1999 Slovak gold medal Comenius University in Bratislava; 2001 Czech Charles University in Prague memorial silver medal 2012 Czech Academy of Sciences Ernst Mach Honorary Medal; 2012 Julius Wess Award Karlsruhe Institute of Technology; 2012 Special Fundamental Physics Prize; 2013 EPS HEPP Prize; 2017 APS Panofsky Prize; Honorary Degrees from the Stockholm University, the University of Copenhagen, the ETHZ, the Pontifical Catholic University of Chile, the University of Nova Gorica, the University of Bern, the Aix Marseille University, the Tbilisi State University, and the Weizmann Institute of Science
- Scientific career
- Fields: Physics (Particle physics)
- Workplaces: CERN, Albert-Ludwigs-Universität Freiburg

Peter Jenni (born 17 April 1948) is an experimental particle physicist working at CERN. He is best known as one of the "founding fathers" of the ATLAS experiment at the CERN Large Hadron Collider together with a few other colleagues. He acted as spokesperson (project leader) of the ATLAS Collaboration until 2009. ATLAS is a world-wide collaboration which started in 1992 involving roughly 3,000 physicists at 183 institutions in 38 countries. Jenni was directly involved in the experimental work leading to the discoveries of the W and Z bosons in the 1980s and the Higgs boson in 2012. He is (co-)author of about 1000 publications in scientific journals.

== Early life and education ==
Peter Jenni, Swiss, born in 1948, obtained his Diploma for Physics at the University of Bern in 1973 and his Doctorate at the Swiss Federal Institute of Technology in Zürich (ETHZ) in 1976. His thesis examined very small angle elastic scattering in the Coulomb-nuclear interference region. Peter Jenni is married and has two adult children.

== Research career ==
Peter Jenni participated in CERN experiments at the Synchro-Cyclotron (1972/3), at the Proton Synchrotron (1974/6), and as ETHZ Research Associate at the Intersecting Storage Rings (ISR) (1976/7), the first high-energy hadron collider. From 1974 to summer 1976 he worked as a CERN Fellow in the group of M. Ferro-Luzzi. The group measured the Coulomb nuclear interference scattering of π±, K± and p± on hydrogen and deuterium in two experiments at the CERN PS. The measured real parts of the forward scattering amplitudes were used in dispersion relations. One of these measurements was the subject of the doctoral thesis (H. Hofer).

From 1976 to 1977 Research Associate at the Swiss Federal Institute of Technology in Zürich (ETHZ) working in the CERN-ETH-Saclay collaboration R702 at the CERN Intersecting Storage Rings (P. Darriulat, B. Richter). The experiment covered studies on electron pair production, on e μ events as a signature for charmed particles, and on very high transverse momentum π0 production in pp reactions.

During 1978 and 1979, Research Associate at the Stanford Linear Accelerator Centre (SLAC), Stanford, USA, in B. Richter's group. Participated in the MARK II SLAC-LBL Berkeley experiment at the e+e– storage ring SPEAR. Mainly involved in the following physics analyses: two-photon reactions, meson form factors, and search for the charmed mesons.

The first measurement of the two-photon widths of the η prime was giving further direct support to the quark model. In SLAC he also worked on operating the liquid-argon calorimeter for the MARK II experiment where his interest in high-performance calorimetry was developed.

He became a CERN staff member in 1980 working with the UA2 experiment at the Super Proton Synchrotron collider (major involvement in the discoveries of jets and the W and Z bosons). Worked on the design for the UA2 upgrade since 1984, with special motivation for missing transverse energy signatures. Project leader of the new end cap calorimeter constructed for the upgraded UA2 experiment. As from March 1987, also group leader of the CERN UA2 group. Coordinated calorimeter and trigger work for the upgraded UA2 experiment.

Already during the UA2 time, strong interest in the physics and instrumentation at future colliders, in particular LHC. Early involvement as convener of the jet study group at the ECFA-CERN LHC workshop 1984 (Lausanne, Geneva), member of the advisory panel on the physics potential and the feasibility of experiments at the multi-TeV energies (La Thuile workshop 1987), and calorimetry overview at the ECFA study week on instrumentation technology for high-luminosity hadron colliders (Barcelona 1989).

He more and more shifted to the Large Hadron Collider (LHC). From 1991 the main activities concentrated on tasks related to the informal spokespersonship first of a proto-Collaboration. Peter Jenni was involved in the early phases of the calorimeter R&D projects RD1 and RD3, during 1990–1992. In 1995, after formal approval of the ATLAS project, he was elected Spokesperson of the experiment, which today comprises some 3000 scientists representing 183 Institutions from 38 countries. He was re-elected several times and retired from this duty in February 2009, with Fabiola Gianotti as his successor. He retained however a strong involvement in the operation and physics of the experiment.

After his retirement as a CERN Senior Research Staff end of April 2013, Peter Jenni has become a Guest Scientist and Honorary Professor with the Albert-Ludwigs-Universität Freiburg, keeping his full engagement with the ATLAS experiment. He is also an Honorary Professor at the University of Science and Technology of China in Hefei, China.

He has authored and co-authored many review articles about the LHC project, the Higgs boson discovery, and the history of hadron colliders, for example in 2021 in the CERN Courier.

In 2014 he has been elected as corresponding member of the Bavarian Academy of Sciences, in 2019 as a Fellow of the European Academy of Sciences EurASc., and in 2023 corresponding member of the Slovenian Academy of Sciences and Arts.

== Advisory roles – Major physics committee involvement ==
– Final two years of the ISRC, CERN (1982 and 1983)
– Four years LEPC, CERN (1986–1990)
– Almost five years PRC of DESY as referee on the HERA experiment calorimetry, DESY, Hamburg, Germany (1984–1989)
– First few years of SSC PAC, Dallas, U.S. (1989–1991)
– Joint Institute for Nuclear Research (JINR) Dubna Scientific Council (2008–2018)
– Served, and still serves, in numerous advisory boards at institute, national, and international levels, in particular for the future HEP projects
– During 2012 and 2013 he was strongly involved in shaping the scientific input with the Preparatory Group for the Update of the European Strategy for Particle Physics, personally motivated to promote CERN's future at the high energy frontier
– He was a member of High Level Strategy Group of the first Latin American Strategy Forum for Research Infrastructures during 2019 – 2020, and since 2021 he is assuming a consulting role in the first African Strategy for Fundamental and Applied Physics

== Invited lectures and outreach ==
Peter Jenni is frequently invited to give public lectures on experimental particle physics at the LHC. In 2011 he gave a talk Highlights of ATLAS at the international symposium on subnuclear physics held in Vatican City. Jenni is well known for his efforts to involve also physicists from countries that are not CERN member states in the construction of the ATLAS experiment. As a Spokesperson he frequently interacted with scientists from all five continents as well as with many funding agencies and science authorities. Thanks to his efforts many universities and institutes from a wide variety of countries became members of the ATLAS Collaboration making it a truly international experiment. He often says that the biggest reward for him is to see how enthusiastic and motivated young people are about physics and he constantly tries to help future generations to get the same or even more opportunities in high energy physics. It is in this spirit that he, together with his ATLAS co-laureate of the Special Fundamental Physics Prize, Fabiola Gianotti, donated all prize money for educational and humanitarian purposes, and created the ATLAS PhD Award sponsoring PhD students. He is also a founding member of the CERN and Society Foundation, an independent non-profit organization to support and promote the dissemination of the benefits of CERN through education and outreach, innovation and knowledge exchange, and culture and art.

== Awards ==
- In 1998 the Swiss Greinacher Prize
- In 1999 the Slovak gold medal of the Comenius University in Bratislava
- In 2001 the Czech Charles University in Prague memorial silver medal
- In 2012 the Czech Academy of Sciences Ernst Mach Honorary Medal
- In 2012 he was awarded the Julius Wess Award from Karlsruhe Institute of Technology together with Michel Della Negra.
- In 2012 he was awarded a share of the Special Breakthrough Prize in Fundamental Physics.
- In 2013 he was awarded a share of the European Physical Society High Energy Particle Physics Prize.
- In 2017 received together with Michel Della Negra and Tejinder Virdee the American Physical Society Panofsky Prize for experimental particle physics.
- He was awarded honorary degrees from the Stockholm University, the University of Copenhagen (2013), the ETHZ, the Pontifical Catholic University of Chile, the University of Nova Gorica, the University of Bern, the Aix-Marseille University, the Ivane Javakhishvili Tbilisi State University, and the Weizmann Institute of Science.
