= Michel Della Negra =

French physicist (born 1942)

- Born: 1942 (age 83–84)
- Education: College de France
- Awards: KIT Julius Wess Prize (2012); EPS High Energy and Particle Physics Prize (2013); Breakthrough Prize in Fundamental Physics (2013); Prix André Lagarrigue (2014); Panofsky Prize (2017)
- Scientific career
- Fields: elementary particle physics
- Institutions: CERN

Michel Della Negra (born 1942) is a French experimental particle physicist known for his role in the 2012 discovery of the Higgs Boson.

== Career ==
Della Negra studied mathematics and theoretical physics for his doctorate at the Laboratory of Nuclear Physics of the College de France in Paris, defending his thesis on the experimental study of proton-antiproton annihilation in 1967. In the 1970s, following post-doctoral work at the Stanford Linear Accelerator Center (SLAC) in Palo Alto, California, he involved himself on high-energy physics projects at CERN in Geneva, Switzerland, where he worked initially as a member of the Intersecting Storage Rings group. In 1977 joined the team led by Carlo Rubbia and played an important role in the 1981 discovery of the W and Z bosons. Della Negra and his colleague from Imperial College London, Tejinder Singh Virdee, were among the first to envisage a hermetic detector for the Large Hadron Collider (LHC) based on a strong magnetic field, the compact muon solenoid (CMS), and was spokesman for the CMS from 1992 until 2006. Together with evidence from the A Toroidal LHC Apparatus (ATLAS), the CMS experiments were crucial to the discovery of the Higgs Boson in 2012. As of 2018 he is physicist emeritus of the physics department of CERN, and CMS emeritus at Imperial College London.

== Awards ==
Della Negra shared the 2013 Special Breakthrough Prize in Fundamental Physics for the discovery of the Higgs Boson with his pioneering colleagues Fabiola Gianotti and Peter Jenni from ATLAS, Tejinder Singh Virdee, Guido Tonelli, and Joe Incandela from CMS, and LHC project leader Lyn Evans. He also shared the 2012 Julius Wess Prize from the Karlsruhe Institute of Technology with Jenni, and the 2013 High Energy and Particle Physics Prize of the European Physical Society with P. Jenni, T. Virdee, and the CMS and Atlas collaborations. In 2014 he won the Prix André Lagarrigue of the University of Paris-Sud for his "exceptional quality in building experimental devices of great complexity, with a profound understanding of physics". In 2017 he shared the Panofsky Prize in experimental particle physics with Jenni and Virdee.
