= CESRA =

Nonprofit organization

Community of European Solar Radio Astronomers
- Abbreviation: CESRA
- Formation: 1970
- Purpose: Stimulate research of the solar atmosphere by means of radio waves and any other suitable diagnostics.
- Leader: Eduard Kontar
- Parent organization: ESPD
- Website: cesra.net

The Community of European Solar Radio Astronomers (CESRA) is a non-profit informal organization of European scientists whose aims are to promote studies of solar radio physics and related topics.

Established in 1970, its membership includes scientists from 28 European research institutes.

== History ==
Arnold O. Benz reports that CESRA was initiated by a letter written in June 1970 by A.D. Fokker (Utrecht) with which he invited "many" solar radio astronomers to a meeting at the International Astronomical Union (IAU) General Assembly in Brighton (August 18–27, 1970) (the letter was found by Arnold O. Benz. CESRA's initial purpose was to promote the development of a European instrument for solar radio observations, the Joint Interferometer Project (JIP). The organization's "statement of intentions and policy" was adopted at the 1972 meeting in Bordeaux. Initially the "CESRA" acronym meant "Committee of European Solar Radio Astronomers" and members were the representatives from each observatory. In that phase CESRA was chaired by A.D. Fokker. When JIP became unrealistic in 1978, it was decided not to dissolve the organization, but give it to a "caretaker" to do whatever needed. The caretaker was Arnold O. Benz until 1992. In 1992 at a meeting with Arnold O. Benz, M. Pick, G. Trottet, A. Magun and P. Zlobec, decided to transform CESRA to a more organized entity with a President, a Board and Statutes, changed "Committee" to "Community" and gave CESRA a democratic structure with statutes similar to today's. Since 1992 the following scientists have served as CESRA presidents: Arnold O. Benz (Zurich; 1992–1998), Karl-Ludwig Klein (Meudon; 1998–2010), Silja Pohjolainen (Turku; 2010–2016), and Eduard Kontar (Glasgow; 2016–...).

== Conferences ==
CESRA organizes triennial workshops on investigations of the solar atmosphere using radio and other observations. Although special emphasis is given to radio diagnostics, the workshop topics are of interest to a large community of solar physicists. The format of the workshops usually combine plenary sessions and working group sessions, with invited review talks, oral contributions, and posters. The workshops attract not only European scientists, but also scientists from the US, China, Japan, Australia, and Brazil. CESRA has also cosponsored international solar physics conferences organized by the European Physical Society and in one occasion has organized a session within the European Geophysical Society's General Assembly.

== Summer schools ==
Three summer schools have been organized by CESRA. The schools were open to solar radio physicists including PhD students and early career researchers. They covered the essential elements of theory, modeling and data analysis and featured lectures and tutorials. Students had the opportunity to meet and discuss research topics with their peers together in an informal atmosphere.

== Publications ==
Proceedings of CESRA workshops include review articles as well as original research articles and are usually published in Solar Physics (journal)'s Topical Issues. The proceedings of some CESRA workshops (until 2004) have been published in Springer's Lecture Notes in Physics.

== Solar radio science highlights ==
CESRA web page hosts "Solar radio science highlights". These are short communications written by CESRA members that publicize fresh research (normally based on a refereed paper published within three months) to keep CESRA community informed and up-to-date. They are written in a language accessible to non-experts, using a "news-and-views" style.

== Proceedings ==
- 1972: CESRA-1, Bordeaux, France
- 1974: CESRA-2, Berne, Switzerland
- 1975: CESRA-3, Florence, Italy
- 1978: CESRA-4: Contexte Coronal des Eruptions Solaires, Toulouse, France
- 1980: CESRA-5: Solar Noise Storms (Orages solaires de type I), Gordes, France
- 1982: CESRA-6: Solar Noise Storms, Duino, Italy
- 1985: CESRA-7: Radio Continua During Solar Flares, Duino
- 1986: CESRA-8: Particle Acceleration and Trapping in Solar Flares, Aubigny-sur-Nère, France
- 1989: CESRA-9: Particle Beams in the Solar Atmosphere, Braunwald, Switzerland
- 1991: CESRA-10: Fragmentation of Energy Release in Space, Ouranoupolis, Greece; No Proceedings
- 1993: Fragmented Energy Release in Sun and Stars: cosponsored by CESRA cosponsored, Utrecht, The Netherlands
- 1994: CESRA-11: Coronal Magnetic Energy Releases, Potsdam, Germany
- 1996: CESRA-12: Coronal Physics from Radio and Space Observations, Nouan le Fuzelier, France
- 1998: CESRA-13: Coronal Explosive Events, Espoo, Finland; No Proceedings
- 1999: Magnetic Fields and Solar Processes: EPS-Solar Physics Meeting cosponsored by CESRA & JOSO; Proceedings: ESA SP-448 (ed. A. Wilson), Florence, Italy
- 2000: CESRA-14: Workshop on Collisionless Shock Waves in the Solar Corona and the Heliosphere: Session at the 25th EGS General Assembly, Nice, France; No Proceedings
- 2001: CESRA-15: Energy Conversion and Particle Acceleration in the Solar Corona, Schloss Ringberg, Germany
- 2004: CESRA-16: The High Energy Solar Corona: Waves, Eruptions, Particles, Sabhal Mòr Ostaig, Scotland
- 2005: The Dynamic Sun: Challenges for Theory and Observations (ESPM-11), cosponsored by CESRA & JOSO, Leuven, Belgium
- 2007: CESRA-17: Solar Radio Physics and the Flare-CME relationship, Ioannina, Greece
- 2010: CESRA-18: Energy storage and release through the solar activity cycle – models meet radio observations, La Roche en Ardenne, Belgium
- 2013: CESRA-19: New eyes looking at solar activity: Challenges for theory and simulations, Prague, Czech Republic
- 2014: 14th European Solar Physics Meeting (ESPM-14): cosponsored by CESRA, Dublin, Ireland
- 2016: CESRA-20: Solar radio physics from the chromosphere to near Earth, Orleans, France
- 2017: 15th European Solar Physics Meeting (ESPM-15): cosponsored by CESRA, Budapest, Hungary
- 2019: CESRA-21: The Sun and the inner heliosphere, Telegrafenberg, Germany, Potsdam
- 2021: 16th European Solar Physics Meeting (ESPM-16): cosponsored by CESRA, Virtual meeting

== See also ==
- List of astronomical societies
