= Martin Lüscher =

Swiss theoretical physicist (born 1949)

Martin Lüscher (born August 3, 1949, in Bern) is a Swiss theoretical physicist, who works primarily on numerical quantum chromodynamics (lattice field theory).

Lüscher studied at the University of Bern and the University of Hamburg, where he earned his doctorate. He worked since the 1979s at DESY in Hamburg, was a professor for theoretical physics in Bern from 1980 to 1983 and later in Hamburg. Since 1999 he is at CERN.

Lüscher is one of the people who are the driving powers in the development of "quantum chromodynamics on the lattice". Among other results, in 1991 he found with Weisz and Wolff a new recursive procedure, which avoids large lattices and allows studies for many length scales (Non Perturbative Renormalization-Group). In the 1980s he developed with Weisz "improved actions" for lattice field theories, which achieve better convergence properties in the continuum limit.

In 2000 he received the Max Planck medal of the Deutschen Physikalischen Gesellschaft and in 2004 the Greinacher Prize of the University of Bern. In 2025 he received, jointly with Jürg Gasser and Heinrich Leutwyler, the High Energy and Particle Physics Prize of the European Physical Society, "for their groundbreaking contributions to theoretical methods advancing our understanding of strong interactions in the non-perturbative regime".

== Selected works ==
- Lüscher “Von den Pionen zu den fundamentalen Parametern der QCD”, Physikalische Blätter 2000 Nr.7/8 (Planck Prize lecture)
- Lüscher “Chiral gauge theories revisited”, Erice Lectures 2000
- Lüscher “ A Portable High-Quality Random Number Generator for Lattice Field Theory Simulations” 1993 (computer code by Lüscher from his website)
- Lüscher “Advanced Lattice QCD”, Les Houches Lectures 1997

== See also ==
- Lüscher–Weisz action
