= Christine Sutton =

British physicist

- Known for: CERN Courier
- Scientific career
- Fields: Physics
- Institutions: CERN; University of Oxford; New Scientist
- Website: home.cern/authors/christine-sutton

Christine Sutton is a particle physicist who edited the CERN Courier from 2003 to 2015. She retired from CERN in 2015.

Sutton was previously based at the University of Oxford, working in the Particle Physics Group and tutoring physics at St Catherine's College.

She was Physical Sciences Editor for New Scientist magazine in the early 1980s, and has authored several non-fiction science books, most recently (with Frank Close and Michael Marten) The Particle Odyssey (1987, 2002).

She has been awarded the 2001 Outreach Prize of the European Physical Society, jointly with Erik Johansson, "for their innovative use of electronic and printed media to bring HEP to wider public, including professional colleagues, students and school, and in particular their collaboration developing computer interactive packages for educational master classes".

== Contributions to Encyclopædia Britannica ==
She also contributed to the 2007 Encyclopædia Britannica, with 24 articles on particle physics:

1. Argonne National Laboratory (Micropædia article)
2. Colliding-Beam Storage Ring (Micropædia article)
3. DESY (Micropædia article)
4. Electroweak theory (Micropædia article)
5. Fermi National Accelerator Laboratory (Micropædia article)
6. Feynman diagram (Micropædia article)
7. Flavour (Micropædia article)
8. Gluon (Micropædia article)
9. Higgs particle (Micropædia article)
10. Linear accelerator (Micropædia article)
11. Particle accelerators (in part, Macropædia article)
12. Quantum chromodynamics (Micropædia article)
13. Renormalization (Micropædia article)
14. SLAC (Micropædia article)
15. Standard Model (Micropædia article)
16. Strong nuclear force (Micropædia article)
17. Subatomic particles (Macropædia article)
18. Supergravity (Micropædia article)
19. Superstring theory (Micropædia article)
20. Supersymmetry (Micropædia article)
21. Tau (Micropædia article)
22. Unified field theory (Micropædia article)
23. Weak nuclear force (Micropædia article)
24. Z particle (Micropædia article)
