= Solar physics =

Branch of astrophysics

Solar irradiance spectrum showing the intensity of sunlight across wavelengths, comparing direct solar radiation above Earth's atmosphere (yellow) and at sea level (red). Atmospheric absorption bands are visible, shaped by gases in the atmosphere.

Solar physics is the branch of astrophysics that specializes in the study of the Sun. It intersects with many disciplines of pure physics and astrophysics.

Because the Sun is uniquely situated for close-range observing (other stars cannot be resolved with anything like the spatial or temporal resolution that the Sun can), there is a split between the related discipline of observational astrophysics (of distant stars) and observational solar physics.

The study of solar physics is also important as it provides a "physical laboratory" for the study of plasma physics.

== History ==
=== Ancient times ===
Babylonians were keeping a record of solar eclipses, with the oldest record originating from the ancient city of Ugarit, in modern-day Syria. This record dates to about 1300 BC. Ancient Chinese astronomers were also observing solar phenomena (such as solar eclipses and visible sunspots) with the purpose of keeping track of calendars, which were based on lunar and solar cycles. Unfortunately, records kept before 720 BC are very vague and offer no useful information. However, after 720 BC, 37 solar eclipses were noted over the course of 240 years.

=== Medieval times ===
Astronomical knowledge flourished in the Islamic world during medieval times. Many observatories were built in cities from Damascus to Baghdad, where detailed astronomical observations were taken. Particularly, a few solar parameters were measured and detailed observations of the Sun were taken. Solar observations were taken with the purpose of navigation, but mostly for timekeeping. Islam requires its followers to pray five times a day, at specific position of the Sun in the sky. As such, accurate observations of the Sun and its trajectory on the sky were needed. In the late 10th century, Iranian astronomer Abu-Mahmud Khojandi built a massive observatory near Tehran. There, he took accurate measurements of a series of meridian transits of the Sun, which he later used to calculate the obliquity of the ecliptic. Following the fall of the Western Roman Empire, Western Europe was cut from all sources of ancient scientific knowledge, especially those written in Greek. This, plus de-urbanisation and diseases such as the Black Death led to a decline in scientific knowledge in medieval Europe, especially in the early Middle Ages. During this period, observations of the Sun were taken either in relation to the zodiac, or to assist in building places of worship such as churches and cathedrals.

=== Renaissance period ===
In astronomy, the renaissance period started with the work of Nicolaus Copernicus. He proposed that planets revolve around the Sun and not around the Earth, as it was believed at the time. This model is known as the heliocentric model. His work was later expanded by Johannes Kepler and Galileo Galilei. Particularly, Galilei used his new telescope to look at the Sun. In 1610, he discovered sunspots on its surface. In the autumn of 1611, Johannes Fabricius wrote the first book on sunspots, De Maculis in Sole Observatis ("On the spots observed in the Sun").

=== Modern times ===
Modern day solar physics is focused towards understanding the many phenomena observed with the help of modern telescopes and satellites. Of particular interest are the structure of the solar photosphere, the coronal heat problem and sunspots.

== Research ==
The Solar Physics Division of the American Astronomical Society boasts 555 members (as of May 2007), compared to several thousand in the parent organization.

In Europe, there is the European Solar Physics Division of the European Physical Society, which has been organizing the European Solar Physics Meeting (ESPM).

A major thrust of current (2009) effort in the field of solar physics is integrated understanding of the entire Solar System including the Sun and its effects throughout interplanetary space within the heliosphere and on planets and planetary atmospheres. Studies of phenomena that affect multiple systems in the heliosphere, or that are considered to fit within a heliospheric context, are called heliophysics, a new coinage that entered usage in the early years of the current millennium.

=== Space based ===
==== Helios ====
Helios-A and Helios-B are a pair of spacecraft launched in December 1974 and January 1976 from Cape Canaveral, as a joint venture between the German Aerospace Center and NASA. Their orbits approach the Sun closer than Mercury. They included instruments to measure the solar wind, magnetic fields, cosmic rays, and interplanetary dust. Helios-A continued to transmit data until 1986.

==== SOHO ====
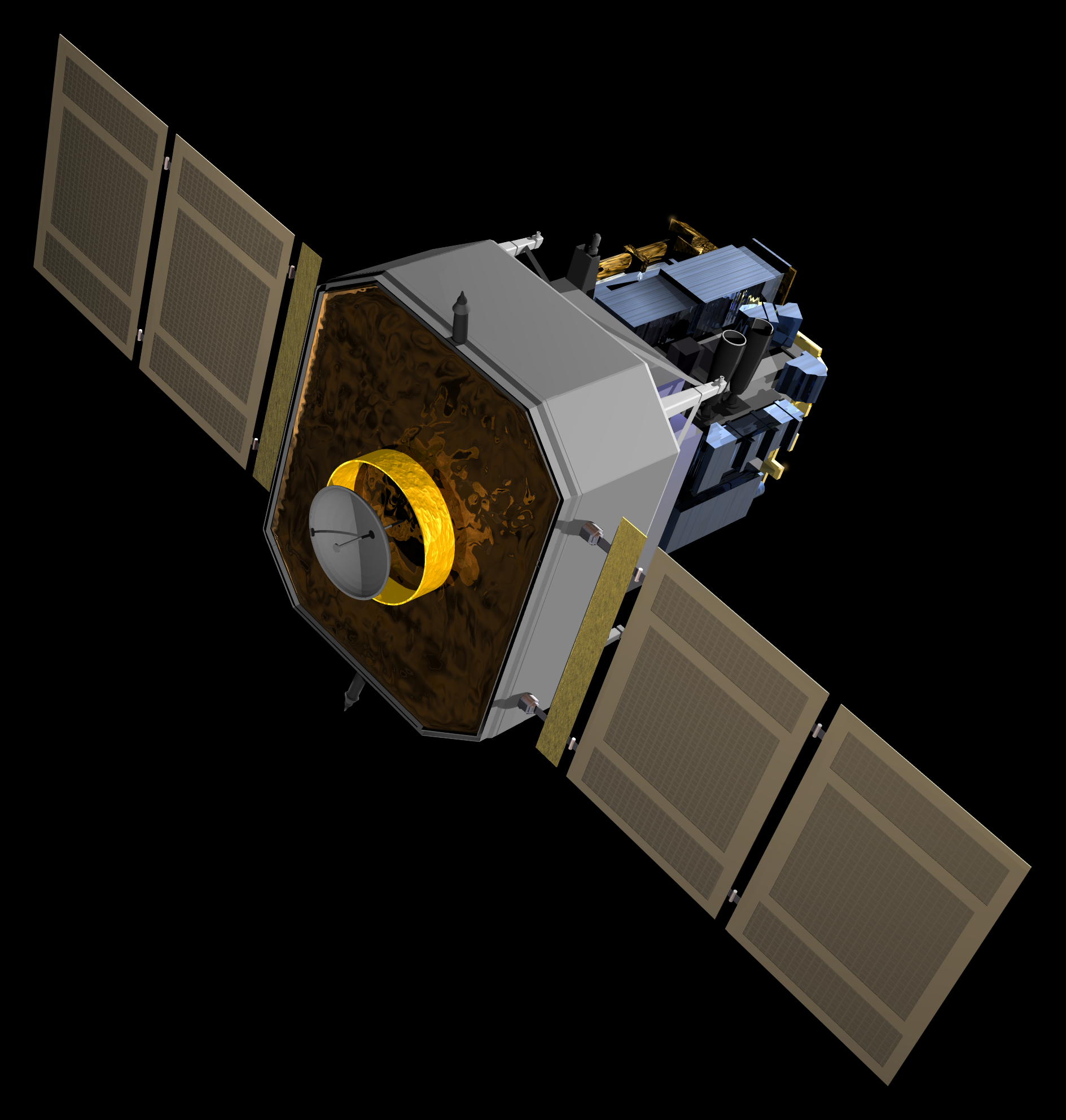
Image of SOHO spacecraft

The Solar and Heliospheric Observatory, SOHO, is a joint project between NASA and ESA that was launched in December 1995. It was launched to probe the interior of the Sun, make observations of the solar wind and phenomena associated with it and investigate the outer layers of the Sun.

==== HINODE ====
A publicly funded mission led by the Japanese Aerospace Exploration Agency, the HINODE satellite, launched in 2006, consists of a coordinated set of optical, extreme ultraviolet and X-ray instruments. These investigate the interaction between the solar corona and the Sun's magnetic field.

==== SDO ====
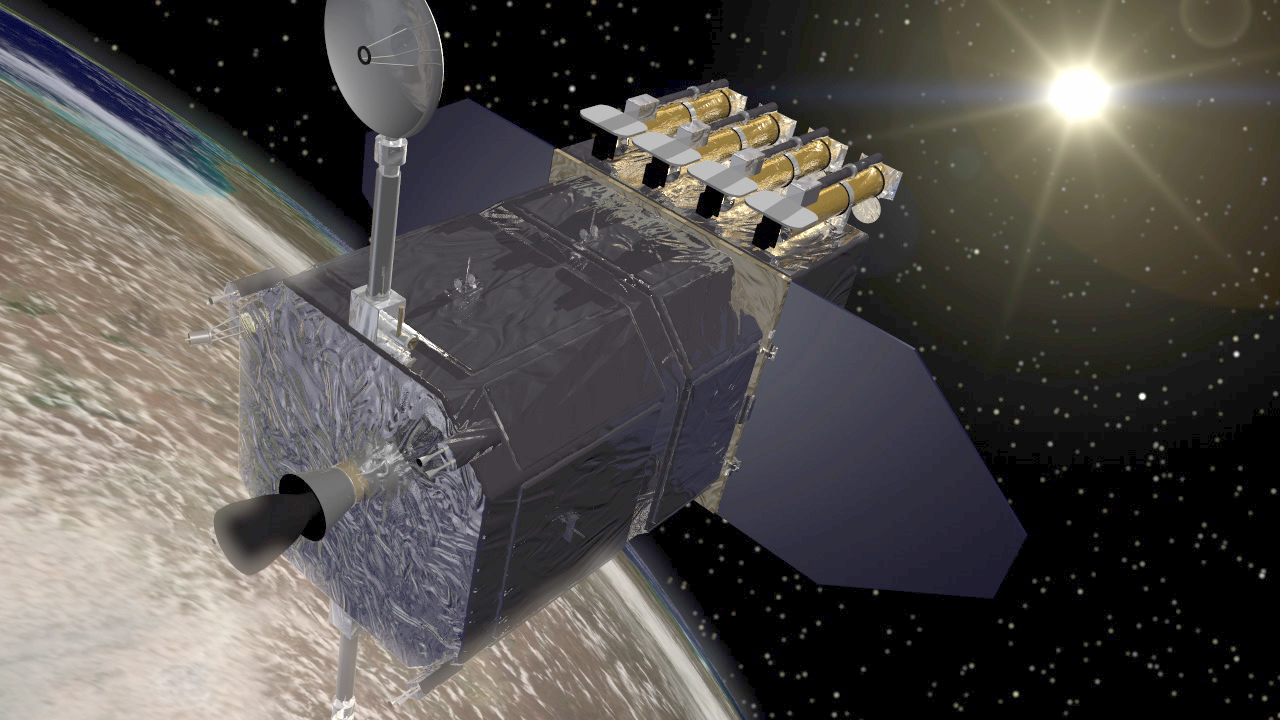
The SDO satellite

The Solar Dynamics Observatory (SDO) was launched by NASA in February 2010 from Cape Canaveral. The main goals of the mission are understanding how solar activity arises and how it affects life on Earth by determining how the Sun's magnetic field is generated and structured and how the stored magnetic energy is converted and released into space.

==== PSP ====
The Parker Solar Probe (PSP) was launched in 2018 with the mission of making detailed observations of the outer solar corona. It has made the closest approaches to the Sun of any artificial object.

==== Solar Orbiter ====
The Solar Orbiter was launched in 2020. Solar Orbiter is the most advanced scientific instrument ever sent to study the Sun. It takes closer and more detailed images of the Sun than any spacecraft before and is the first to explore its polar regions.

=== Ground based ===
==== ATST ====
The Advanced Technology Solar Telescope (ATST) is a solar telescope facility that is under construction in Maui. Twenty-two institutions are collaborating on the ATST project, with the main funding agency being the National Science Foundation.

==== SSO ====
Sunspot Solar Observatory (SSO) operates the Richard B. Dunn Solar Telescope (DST) on behalf of the NSF.

==== Big Bear ====
The Big Bear Solar Observatory in California houses several telescopes including the New Solar Telescope(NTS) which is a 1.6 meter, clear-aperture, off-axis Gregorian telescope. The NTS saw first light in December 2008. Until the ATST comes on line, the NTS remains the largest solar telescope in the world. The Big Bear Observatory is one of several facilities operated by the Center for Solar-Terrestrial Research at New Jersey Institute of Technology (NJIT).

=== Other ===
==== EUNIS ====
The Extreme Ultraviolet Normal Incidence Spectrograph (EUNIS) is a two channel imaging spectrograph that first flew in 2006. It observes the solar corona with high spectral resolution. So far, it has provided information on the nature of coronal bright points, cool transients and coronal loop arcades. Data from it also helped calibrating SOHO and a few other telescopes.

== See also ==
- Aeronomy
- Helioseismography
- Heliophysics
- Institute for Solar Physics (in La Palma in the Canary Islands)
