= Outreach Prize of EPS =

The Outreach Prize, for outstanding achievement in outreach, including education and the promotion of diversity, in connection with High Energy Physics and/or Particle Astrophysics is managed by the High Energy Particle Division (EPS-HEPP) of the European Physical Society (EPS).

The prize is awarded during the EPS conference on High Energy Physics, together with the other prizes awarded by EPS-HEPP: High Energy and Particle Physics Prize, the Cocconi Prize, the Gribov Medal and the Young Experimental Physicist Prize.

Nominations for the award may be submitted through an open call for nominations issued by the EPS-HEPP, usually in January of odd years. Selection of the prize recipients will be made by the Division and proposed to the president of EPS, who will officially announce the name(s) of the winner(s).

== Recipients ==
- 2025 Beamline for Schools Project

“for its original, innovative and successful outreach program of global competitions for high-school teams, offering the winning teams the unique opportunity to carry out their proposed experiments at major particle physics accelerator laboratories such as CERN or DESY”.

- 2023 Jácome (Jay) Armas

“for his outstanding combination of activities on science communication, most notably for the 'Science & Cocktails' event series, revolving around science lectures which incorporate elements of the nightlife such as music/art performances and cocktail craftsmanship and reaching out to hundreds of thousands in five different cities world-wide”.

- 2021 Uta Bilow, Kenneth Cecire and Sascha Mehlhase

“Uta Bilow and Kenneth Cecire for the long-term coordination and major expansion of the International Particle Physics Master Classes. Sascha Mehlhase for the design and creation of the ATLAS detector and other interlocking-brick models”.

- 2019 Rob Appleby, Chris Edmonds and Robyn Watson

“for the Tactile Collider Project that brings particle physics to blind and visually impaired schoolchildren through touch and sound”.

- 2017 Michael Hoch

“for initiatives highlighting the conceptual and physical beauty of high-energy physics, and the inspirational qualities that are common to both Art and Science”.

- 2015 Kate Shaw

“for her contributions to the International Masterclasses and for her pioneering role in bringing them to countries with no strong tradition in particle physics”.

- 2013 Don Lincoln

“for communicating in multiple media the excitement of High Energy Physics to high-school students and teachers, and the public at large”.

- 2011 Christine Kourkoumelis, Sofoklis Sotiriou

“for building educational resources to bring the research process in particle physics and its results to teachers and students, both nationally and across Europe”.

- 2009 Herbert Dreiner, Michael Kortmann

“for the idea and realization of a physics show performed by university students and especially for the realization and sustainment of a particle physics show within this framework”.

- 2007 Richard Jacobsson, Charles Timmermans

“for their outstanding contributions in promoting HEP to the public and in High Schools in Europe”.

- 2005 Dave Barney, Peter Kalmus

“Dave Barney, for promoting the fascination of particle physics to the public, in parallel to his research work in the CMS collaboration at CERN. His impressive and successful efforts are concentrated around the CMS experiment, but also reaching far beyond his own experiment. Peter Kalmus, for his long-standing and major personal involvement in particle physics outreach. In the last years, he has given talks for schools and the public to a total audience of some 24,000 in countries from the UK, Ireland and France to South Africa, Singapore and India”.

- 2004 Alessandro Pascolini

“for his contribution to public awareness of High Energy Particle, Astroparticle and Nuclear Physics in Italy and Europe”.

- 2003 Rolf Landua, Nick Tracas

“Rolf Landua for his outreach activities at CERN (CERN Courier, Physics on Stage, Life in the Universe, High School Teachers programme). Nick Tracas for his outreach activities in Greece, promoting the public image of physics in Greece through programmes for high school teachers, activities for Physics on Stage and Life in the Universe”.

- 2002 Michael Kobel

“for his work in bringing high energy particle physics into schools in Germany. In particular he has worked directly with educators to introduce particle physics into the curriculum, both through the creation of new materials and the imaginative use of concepts developed in other European countries. He has also been instrumental in promoting activities such as masterclasses”.

- 2001 Christine Sutton, Erik Johansson

“for their innovative use of electronic and printed media to bring HEP to wider public, including professional colleagues, students and school, and in particular their collaboration developing computer interactive packages for educational master classes”.

Source: High Energy and Particle Physics Division Prizes, where long citations can also be found.

== See also ==
- List of physics awards
