= Don Lincoln =

American physicist

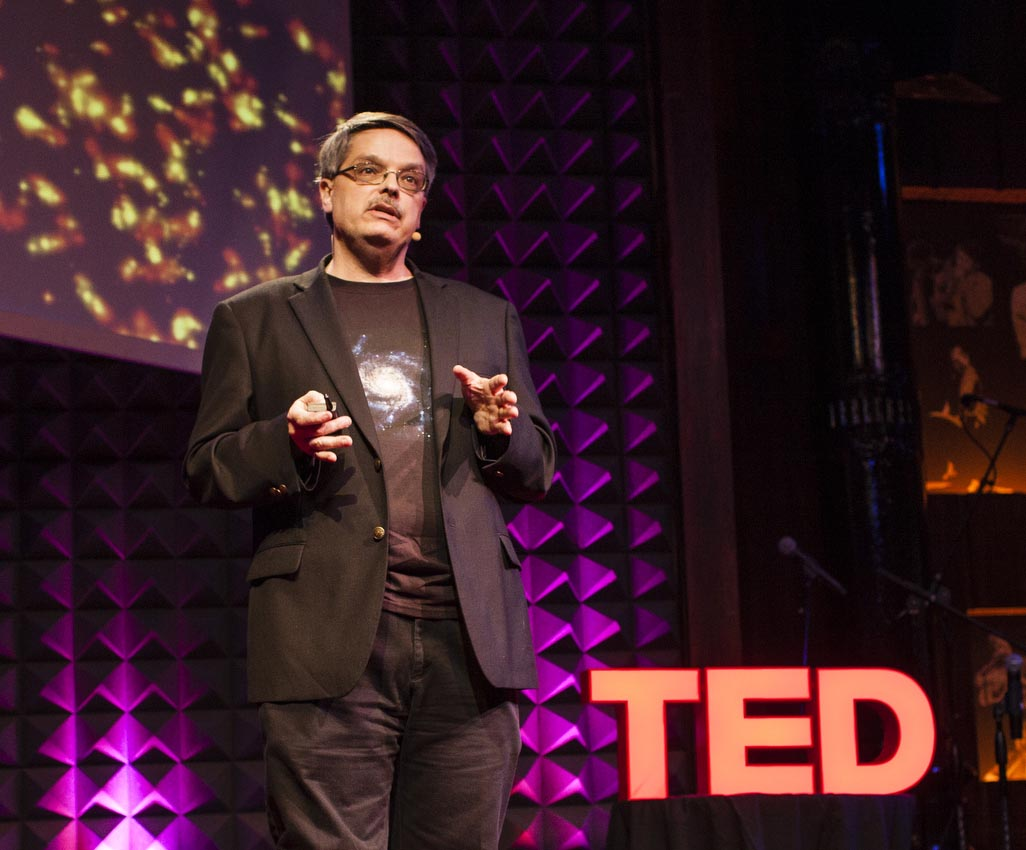
- Born: 1964 (age 61–62); New York City, New York
- Education: Rose-Hulman Institute of Technology (B.S.); Rice University (M.A., Ph.D.)
- Known for: Studies of Quantum Chromodynamics; Searches for new phenomena Particle physics detector technology Public speaking Science popularization
- Awards: European Physical Society HEPP Outreach award (2013); European Physical Society HEPP Award (2013) (shared); Fellow of the American Physical Society (2015); Fellow of the American Association for the Advancement of Science (2016); American Institute of Physics Gemant Award (2017); European Physical Society HEPP Award (2019) (shared); American Association of Physics Teachers Klopsteg Memorial Lecture Award (2024); American Physical Society Dwight Nicholson Medal for Outreach (2024); Breakthrough Prize in Fundamental Physics (2025) (shared)
- Scientific career
- Fields: Experimental particle physics
- Workplaces: Fermi National Accelerator Laboratory; University of Notre Dame

Don Lincoln (born 1964) is an American physicist, author, host of the YouTube channel Fermilab, and science communicator. He conducts research in particle physics at Fermi National Accelerator Laboratory, and was an adjunct professor of physics at the University of Notre Dame, although he is no longer affiliated with the university. He received a Ph.D. in experimental particle physics from Rice University in 1994. In 1995, he was a co-discoverer of the top quark. He has co-authored hundreds of research papers, and more recently, was a member of the team that discovered the Higgs boson in 2012.

== Early life and education ==
Don Lincoln was born in 1964. He received a Ph.D. in experimental particle physics from Rice University in 1994.

== Research ==
Lincoln's research career began in 1987 as a graduate student using the Fermilab accelerator. His thesis work used the highest energy photon beam to study the transition between nuclear physics and modern quark-based particle physics. He then transitioned to studying high energy collisions between protons and antimatter protons using the DZero experiment at Fermilab. In 2008, he began a transition to doing research using the Compact Muon Solenoid detector at CERN. During his research career, he has coauthored 2,000 publications. His expertise includes detector instrumentation, studying the strong nuclear force, and searches for new phenomena.

== Writing Career ==
Lincoln is a public speaker, science writer, and has contributed many scientific articles to magazines that include Analog Science Fiction and Fact in July 2009, Scientific American in November 2012, and July 2015, and The Physics Teacher many times. He is also the author of books for the public about particle physics. His most recent book is 'Einstein's Unfinished Dream' (2023) and it is published by Oxford University Press. His earlier books include 'Understanding the Universe: From Quarks to the Cosmos (Revised edition)' (2012), 'The Quantum Frontier: The Large Hadron Collider' (2009), and 'The Large Hadron Collider: The Extraordinary Story of the Higgs Boson and Other Things That Will Blow Your Mind' (2014). In 2013, he released a book called 'Alien Universe: Extraterrestrials in our Minds and in the Cosmos', which explains how the common images of extraterrestrials came to enter Western culture, and then goes on to explore what modern physics, chemistry, and biology can tell us about what real intelligent alien life might be like. He has been involved in a number of videos dedicated to disseminating discoveries in particle physics, and since July 7, 2011, has been a keynote speaker for a series produced by Fermilab that explores the range of issues dominating particle physics today in an accessible, and sometimes humorous way. Among the topics included in the series are the Higgs boson, antimatter, the nature of neutrinos, the concepts of the Big Bang, cosmic inflation, the multiverse, leptogenesis, and supersymmetry.

His popularizations also include columns that translate CMS (monthly) and DZero (biweekly) physics measurements for the public. He is also the author of a recurring segment, Physics in a Nutshell, in the Fermilab online newspaper, he blogs for the website of the television series NOVA, and he writes for Live Science, Big Think, and CNN. Additionally, he has created over 100 videos that translate particle physics and cosmology for a lay audience. In collaboration with The Teaching Company, he has released video courses that outlined the scientific community's modern understanding of a theory of everything, common misconceptions of science, and why scientists believe some of the mind-boggling claims of modern physics.

== Honors ==
Lincoln is a Fellow of the American Physical Society, a Fellow of the American Association for the Advancement of Science, and recipient of the 2013 Outreach Prize of the High Energy and Particle Physics Division of the European Physical Society “for communicating in multiple media the excitement of High Energy Physics to high-school students and teachers, and the public at large”. He also was awarded the 2017 American Institute of Physics Gemant Award for "cultural, artistic or humanistic contributions to physics for achievements in communication and public outreach". In 2024, he received the Klopsteg Memorial Lecture Award from the American Association of Physics Teachers for "passionate and profound career-long impact in sharing the excitement of contemporary physics topics in ways that interest and inform the general public about the relevance and importance of fundamental physics from cosmology to high energy particle physics through prolific and impactful communication and world-class public outreach programs.” In 2024, he also received the Dwight Nicholson Medal for Outreach from the American Physical Society "for worldwide presentations and publications that educate students and general audiences on the meaning of fundamental scientific research." Experimental collaborations of which he is a member have also received group awards, specifically from the European Physical Society HEPP (2013, shared by the ATLAS and CMS collaborations for the discovery of the Higgs boson) and again (2019, shared by the CDF and DZero collaborations for the discovery of the top quark). Most recently, he was a joint recipient of the 2025 Breakthrough Prize in Fundamental Physics (2025, shared by the ALICE, ATLAS, CMS, and LHCb CERN experiments).

== External references ==
- Don Lincoln on INSPIRE-HEP
- Don Lincoln at Notre Dame
