= Donald Hill Perkins =

British physicist (1925–2022)

Don Perkins
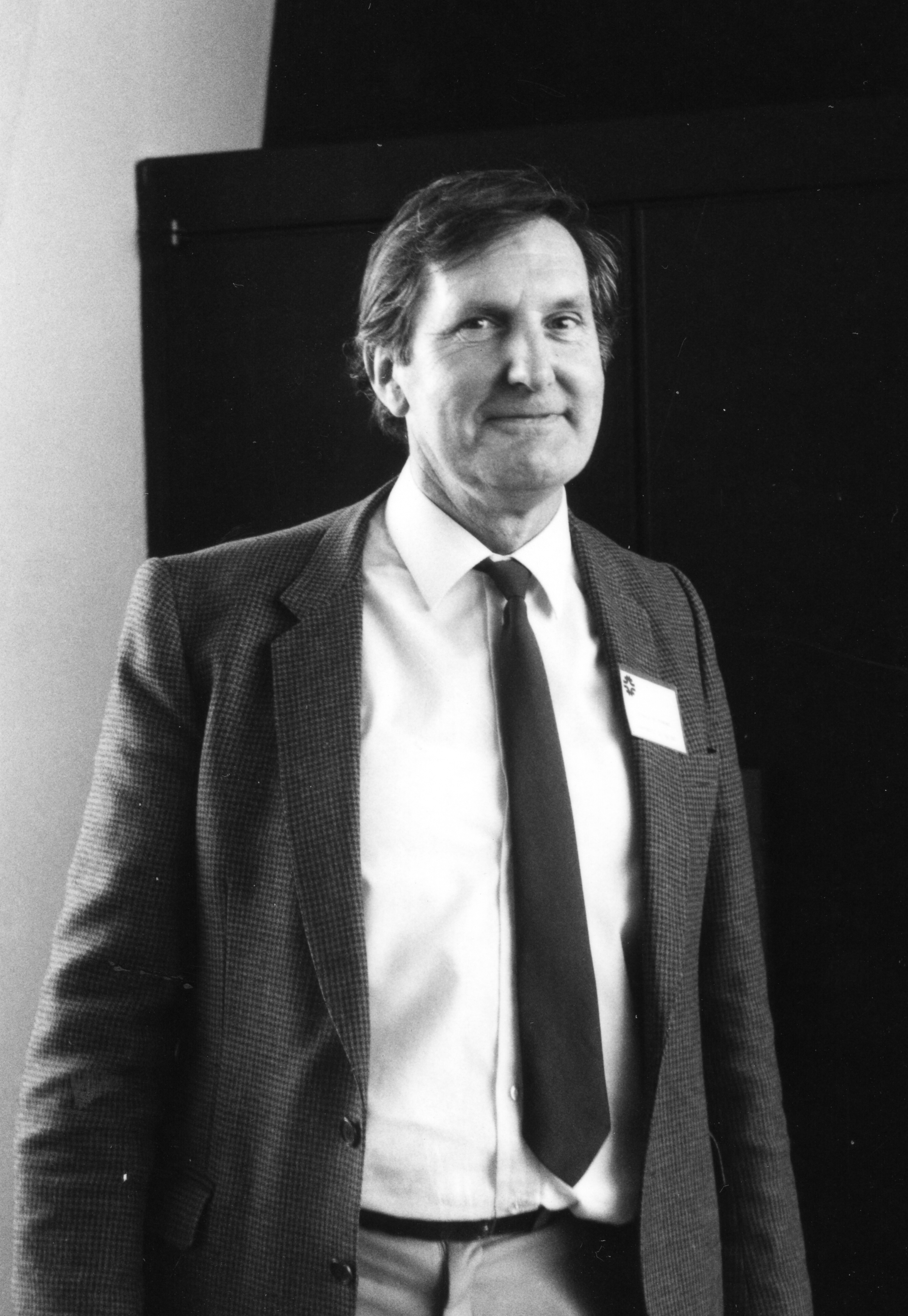
- Born: Donald Hill Perkins; 15 October 1925; Kingston upon Hull, England
- Died: 30 October 2022 (aged 97); Oxford, England

Donald Hill Perkins CBE FRS (15 October 1925 – 30 October 2022) was a British physicist and an emeritus professor at the University of Oxford. He achieved great success in the field of particle physics and was also known for his books.

== Background ==
Perkins was born in Kingston upon Hull, England on 15 October 1925, to Gertrude and George Perkins, both school teachers. He was educated at Imperial College London, and in 1945 he received his B.Sc. and in 1948, a Ph.D. He married Dorothy Maloney in 1955 and they had two daughters.

Perkins died at home in Headington, Oxford, on 30 October 2022, aged 97.

== Career ==
From 1949 he worked at Bristol University and in 1955/56 at the Lawrence Radiation Laboratory in Berkeley. In 1956 he received the post of reader in Bristol University. In 1963/64 he conducted research at CERN. In 1965 he became Oxford professor of elementary particle physics. There, under the leadership of Denys Wilkinson, he built, along with Ken W. Allen, the new Department of Nuclear Physics. In 1976/77 and 1983/84 he returned to CERN on sabbatical leave.

In 1998 he retired and became Emeritus Fellow of St Catherine's College, Oxford.

== Achievements ==
Perkins' earliest achievements include the discovery of the negative pion in cosmic radiation. At Berkeley, he worked with accelerators on K-mesons and the annihilation of protons and antiprotons, at CERN in neutrino scattering experiments.

He made important pioneering discoveries in regard to the weak neutral current (Gargamelle experiment) and the experimental verification of quantum chromodynamics. In 1982 he explored the possible proton decay, and found a first indication of neutrino oscillations.

Perkins together with Peter Fowler first suggested the use of pion beams as a cancer therapy in a Nature article in 1961.

In 1959 Perkins published his first textbook, together with C.F. Powell and Peter Fowler, on the theme of the emulsion technique applied to cosmic rays, nuclear, and particle physics. His Introduction to High Energy Physics is a global standard work on particle physics. In 2003 he published Particle Astrophysics.

== Awards ==
Perkins was awarded honorary doctorates in Bristol and the University of Sheffield. He was elected a Fellow of the Royal Society in 1966. In 1979 he received the Guthrie Medal and Prize of the Institute of Physics, in 1992 the Holweck Prize of the Société Française de Physique, in 1997, the Royal Medal of the Royal Society and in 2001 the High Energy and Particle Physics Prize of the European Physical Society. He gave numerous guest lectures at universities in Toronto, Seattle, Chicago, Hawaii and Victoria and the 2004 Wolfgang Paul Lecture in Bonn.
