= High Energy and Particle Physics Prize =

- Description: Biennial award honoring outstanding contributions to high energy physics in experimental, theoretical, or technological domains
- Presented by: European Physical Society (EPS-HEPP Division)

The High Energy and Particle Physics Prize, established in 1989, is awarded every two years for an outstanding contribution to High Energy Physics in an experimental, theoretical or technological area. The price is administered by the EPS-HEPP Division (EPS-HEPP) of the European Physical Society (EPS) and awarded during the EPS conference on High Energy Physics, together with the Cocconi Prize, the Gribov Medal, the Young Experimental Physicist Prize and the Outreach Prize. Nominations are managed by the EPS-HEPP board through an open call.

By 2023, a total of 34 individuals and six collaboration groups have been recognized by the 17 awards that have been presented so far. Among the individual winners, 12 have also received the Nobel Prize in Physics.

Since 2003 the prize includes non-European in the pool of nominees.

== Recipients ==
- 2025 Jürg Gasser, Heinrich Leutwyler, Martin Lüscher, "for ground-breaking contributions to new theoretical methods that have advanced our understanding of strong interactions in their non-perturbative regime".
- 2023 Cecilia Jarlskog "for the discovery of an invariant measure of CP violation in both quark and lepton sectors", and to Daya Bay / RENO collaborations "for the observation of short-baseline reactor electron-antineutrino disappearance, providing the first determination of the neutrino mixing angle θ_{13}, which paves the way for the detection of CP violation in the lepton sector".
- 2021 Torbjörn Sjöstrand, Bryan Webber, "for the conception, development and realisation of parton shower Monte Carlo simulations".
- 2019 The CDF and D0 collaborations, "for the discovery of the top quark and the detailed measurement of its properties".
- 2017 Erik H. M. Heijne, Robert Klanner, Gerhard Lutz, "for their pioneering contributions to the development of silicon microstrip detectors that revolutionised high-precision tracking and vertexing in high energy physics experiments".
- 2015 James D. Bjorken, "for his prediction of scaling behaviour in the structure of the proton that led to a new understanding of the strong interaction", and to Guido Altarelli, Yury L. Dokshitzer, Lev Lipatov, Giorgio Parisi "for developing a probabilistic field theory framework for the dynamics of quarks and gluons, enabling a quantitative understanding of high-energy collisions involving hadrons".
- 2013 The ATLAS and CMS collaborations, "for the discovery of a Higgs boson, as predicted by the Brout-Englert-Higgs mechanism", and to Michel Della Negra, Peter Jenni, Tejinder Virdee "for their pioneering and outstanding leadership rôles in the making of the ATLAS and CMS experiments".
- 2011 Sheldon Glashow, John Iliopoulos, Luciano Maiani, "for their crucial contribution to the theory of flavour, presently embedded in the Standard Theory of strong and electroweak interactions".
- 2009 The Gargamelle collaboration, "for the observation of the weak neutral current interaction".
- 2007 Makoto Kobayashi, Toshihide Maskawa, "for the proposal of a successful mechanism for CP violation in the Standard Model, predicting the existence of a third family of quarks".
- 2005 Heinrich Wahl and the NA31 Collaboration, "for his outstanding leadership of challenging experiments on CP Violation, and to the NA 31 Collaboration, which showed for the first time Direct CP Violation in the decays of neutral K mesons".
- 2003 David Gross, David Politzer, Frank Wilczek, "for their fundamental contributions to Quantum chromodynamics, the theory of strong interactions. By demonstrating that the theory is asymptotically free, that the couplings become weak at large momentum transfers, they paved the way for showing that the theory is correct".
- 2001 Don Perkins, "for his outstanding contributions to Neutrino Physics and for implementing the use of Neutrinos as a tool to elucidate the Quark Structure on the Nucleon".
- 1999 Gerard ’t Hooft, "for pioneering contributions to the renormalization of non-abelian gauge theories including the non-perturbative aspects of these theories".
- 1997 Robert Brout, François Englert, Peter Higgs, "for formulating for the first time a self-consistent theory of charged massive vector bosons which became the foundation of the electroweak theory of elementary particles".
- 1995 Paul Söding, Bjørn Wiik, Günter Wolf, Sau Lan Wu, "for the first evidence for three-jet events in e^{+}e^{–} collisions at PETRA".
- 1993 Martinus Veltman, "for the role of massive Yang-Mills theories for weak interactions".
- 1991 Nicola Cabibbo, "for the theory of weak interactions leading to the concept of quark mixing".
- 1989 Georges Charpak, "for the development of detectors: multiwire proportional chambers, drift chambers and several other gaseous detectors, and their applications in other fields".
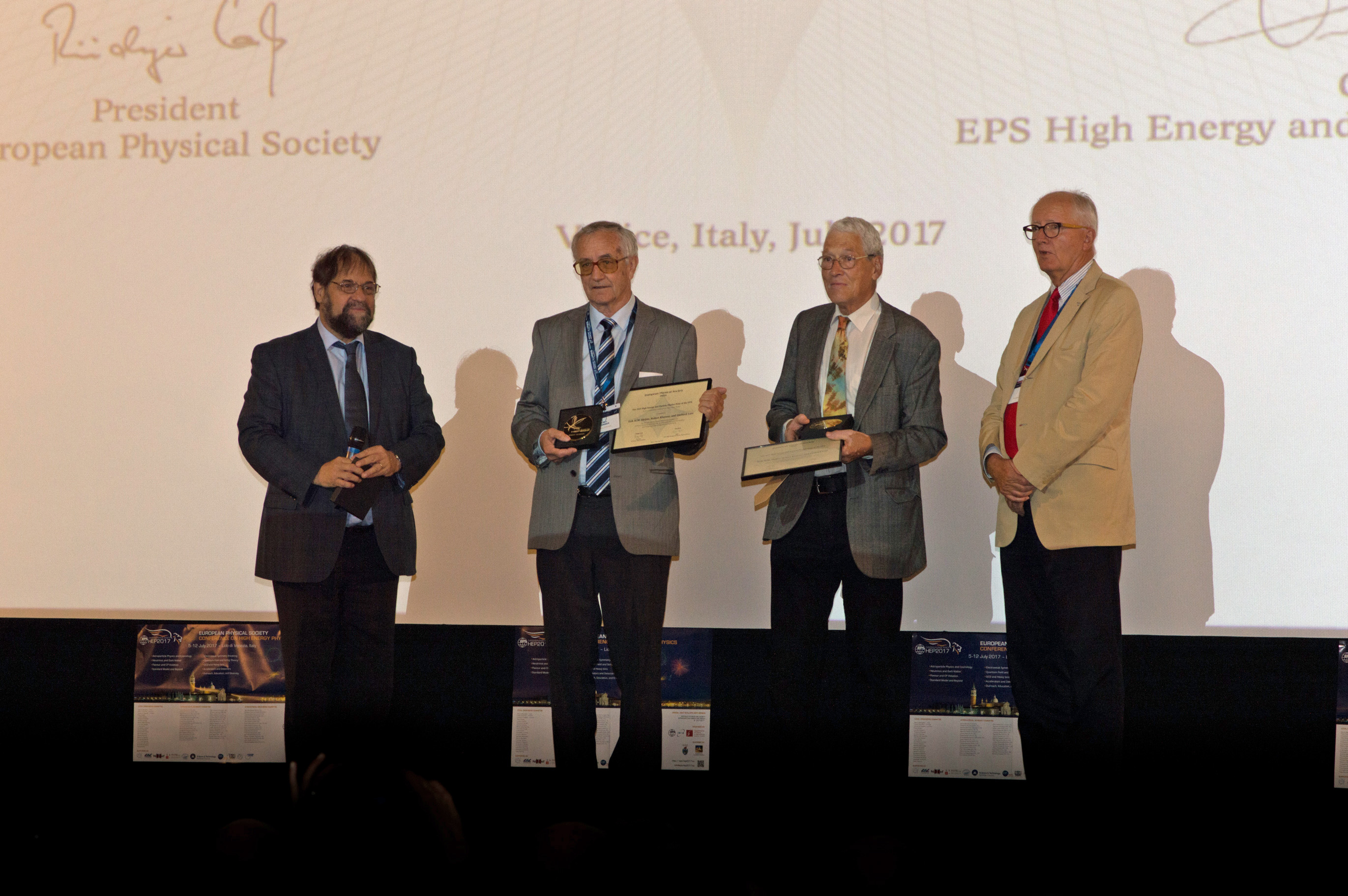
Winners of the EPS-Hepp prize at the 2017 EPS High Energy Physics conference, Lido di Venezia

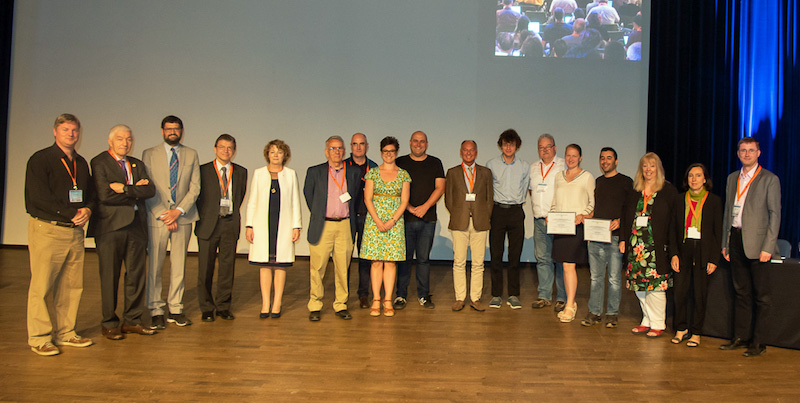
Award winners at the 2019 EPS High Energy Physics conference, Ghent.

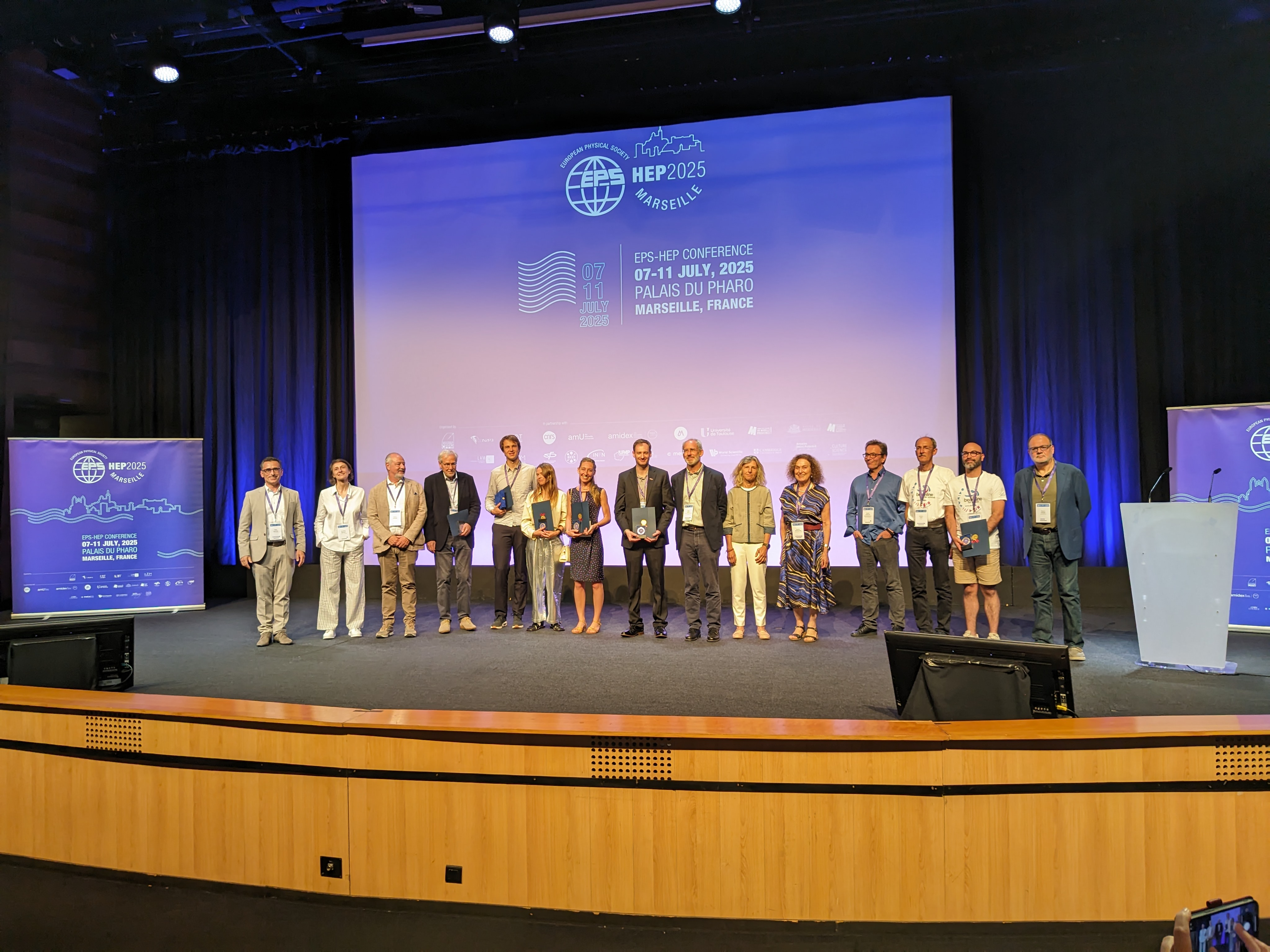
Award winners at the 2025 EPS High Energy Physics conference, Marseille.

== See also ==
- List of physics awards
