= Young Experimental Physicist Prize of EPS =

Young Experimental Physicist Prize
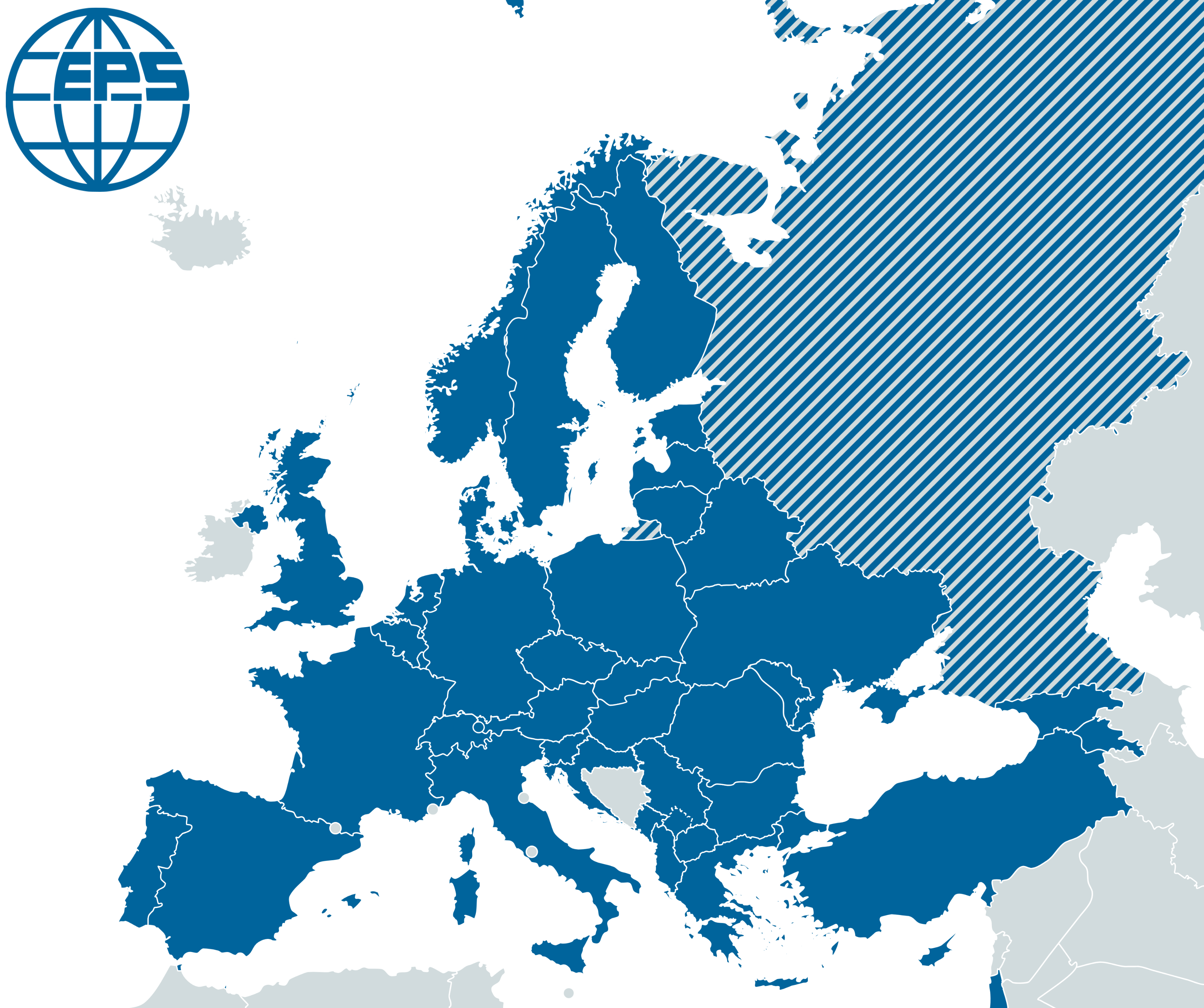
- –
- Awarded for: Outstanding work by one or more early-career experimental physicists in particle physics and/or particle astrophysics
- Location: Awarded at the EPS-HEP Conference on High Energy Physics
- Country: International (Europe)
- Presented by: European Physical Society (EPS), High Energy and Particle Physics Division (EPS-HEPP)
- First award: Established 2001
- Website: Official website

The Young Experimental Physicist Prize, launched in 2001, honors the work by one or more early-career experimental physicists in the field of Particle Physics and/or Particle Astrophysics. It is awarded every two years by the High Energy Particle Physics Division (EPS-HEPP) of the European Physical Society (EPS) during the EPS conference on High Energy Physics, together with the High Energy Particle Physics Prize, the Cocconi Prize, the Gribov Medal and the Outreach Prize.

Nominations for the award may be submitted through an open call for nominations issued by the EPS-HEPP, usually in January of odd years. Selection of the prize recipients will be made by the Division and proposed to the president of EPS, who will officially announce the name(s) of the winner(s).

== Recipients ==
- 2025 Thea Klaeboe Aarrestad, Laura Zani

“Thea Klaeboe Aarrestad for influential and innovative ideas, as well as high-impact contributions to the integration of modern machine learning technologies into particle physics. Laura Zani for outstanding work on searches for physics beyond the standard model at B-Factories, in particular dark matter portals and lepton-flavor-violating decays of the tau lepton, and for remarkable contributions to the construction, commissioning and operation of the Belle II experiment”.

- 2023 Valentina M. M. Cairo

“for her outstanding contributions to the ATLAS experiment: from the construction of the inner tracker, to the development of novel track and vertex reconstruction algorithms and to the searches for di-Higgs boson production”.

- 2021 Nathan Jurik, Ben Nachman

“Nathan Jurik for his outstanding contributions to the LHCb experiment, including the discovery of pentaquarks, and the measurements of CP violation and mixing in the B and D meson systems. Ben Nachman for exceptional contributions to the study of QCD jets as a probe of QCD dynamics and as a tool for new physics searches, his innovative application of machine learning for characterising jets, and the development of novel strategies on jet reconstruction and calibration at the ATLAS experiment".

- 2019 Josh Bendavid, Lesya Shchutska

“Josh Bendavid for outstanding and innovative contributions to detector operations, software development, data analysis and detector upgrades of the CMS experiment. Lesya Shchutska for outstanding contributions to experimental activities in particle physics, from the design and simulation of novel experiments, test-beam operations and analyses, to data analyses and their final theoretical interpretations”.

- 2017 Xin Qian

“for his key contributions to the Daya Bay Reactor neutrino experiment that led to the measurement of the neutrino mixing angle θ_{13} ".

- 2015 Jan Fiete Grosse-Oetringhaus, Giovanni Petrucciani

“Jan Fiete Grosse-Oetringhaus for his outstanding contributions to the investigation of particle collisions at the LHC through the analysis of jet quenching and multiparticle correlations in the ALICE experiment; Giovanni Petrucciani for his outstanding contributions to the optimisation of the tracking in the CMS detector, the Higgs boson discovery and the measurements of its properties “.

- 2013 Diego Martinez Santos

“For his outstanding contributions to the trigger and commissioning of the LHCb experiment, and the analyses leading to first evidence for the rare decay B0s->mu+mu-".

- 2011 Paolo Creminelli, Andrea Rizzi

“To Paolo Creminelli for his contributions to the development of a solid field theoretical approach to early-universe cosmology and for his studies of non-gaussianities in the cosmic microwave background. To Andrea Rizzi for his contributions to the reconstruction software and physics program of the CMS experiment at the LHC”.

- 2009 Maurizio Pierini, Niki Saoulidou

“To M. Pierini for his contributions to the study and analysis of B mesons. To N. Saoulidou for her contribution to neutrino physics”.

- 2007 Ivan Furic, Guillelmo Gomez-Ceballos, Stephanie Menzemer

“For outstanding contributions displaying individual creativity and collaborative effort to the complex analysis which provided the first measurement of the frequency of Bs oscillations”.

- 2005 Mathieu de Naurois

“For his new ideas and decisive contributions in the CELESTE and HESS experiments. His new original method to analyze Cherenkov images of atmospheric showers enabled many new results in HESS and the detection of new sources near the galactic center”.

- 2003 Guillaume Unal

“For his contribution to the analysis of the NA48 data, whereby direct CP violation in Kaon decays was established. He has been involved in most aspects of the experiment and has been a driving force in the physics analysis”.

- 2001 Arnulf Quadt

“For his outstanding contribution to the measurement of the F2 Structure Function in Deep Inelastic Scattering and extending its measurement to low values of momentum transfer and fractional momentum x”.

Source: High Energy and Particle Physics Division Prizes, where long citations can also be found.

== See also ==
- List of physics awards
