= Antigone Marino =

Italian physicist

Antigone Marino is an Italian physicist specializing in the optical properties of soft matter including liquid crystals. She is a researcher in the Institute of Applied Sciences and Intelligent Systems (ISASI) of the Italian National Research Council (CNR), and vice president of Città della Scienza, a science museum in Naples.

== Education and career ==
Marino was a physics student at University of Naples Federico II, where she received a master's degree in 2000 and completed her Ph.D. in 2004. She has served as president of the Italian chapter of the IEEE Photonics Society, and editor-in-chief of Europhysics News. She was named as vice president of Città della Scienza in 2026.

== Recognition ==
Marino was the 2015 recipient of the Optica Ivan P. Kaminow Outstanding Early-Career Professional Prize. She was named an Optica Ambassador in 2016, and received the 2017 Achievement Award of the European Physical Society.

She was named as an Optica Fellow, in the 2027 class of fellows, "for outstanding contributions to the global optics and photonics community through leadership in international student engagement initiatives and inclusive scientific collaboration".
