= Arnold O. Benz =

Swiss astrophysicist

Arnold Benz
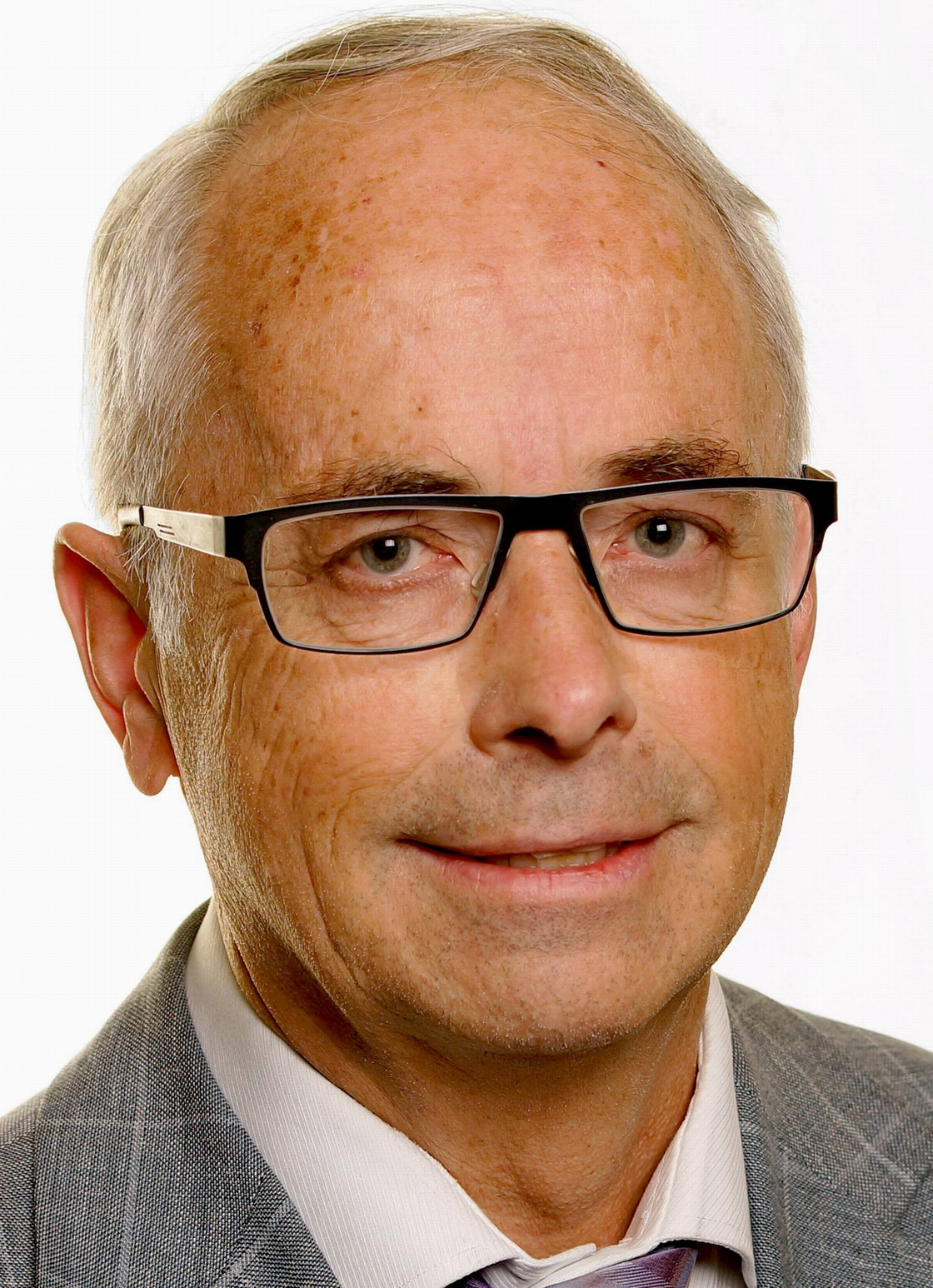
- Arnold O. Benz in 2013
- Born: 21 April 1945 (age 81); Winterthur, Switzerland
- Education: Cornell University
- Known for: Solar radio emission, science-religion dialog
- Awards: Honorary doctorates awarded by University of Zurich (2011) and University of the South (2017)
- Scientific career
- Fields: Astrophysics, theology
- Workplaces: ETH Zurich, Switzerland; FHNW in Windisch, Switzerland
- Thesis: The Acceleration of Solar Wind Protons and Heavy Ions (1973)
- Doctoral advisor: Thomas Gold
- Doctoral students: Markus Aschwanden (Lockheed Martin), Marina Battaglia (FHNW), Simon Bruderer (MPI Garching), André Csillaghy (FHNW), Manuel Güdel (Vienna), Heinz Isliker (Tessaloniki), Säm Krucker (FHNW and UC Berkeley), Pascal Saint-Hilaire (UC Berkeley), and Susanne Wampfler (Bern).

Arnold O. Benz (born 21 April 1945) is a professor emeritus at the Institute for Particle Physics and Astrophysics in the Physics Department of ETH Zurich.

== Education and career ==
Benz was educated at ETH Zurich, where he was awarded a diploma (master's degree) in theoretical physics in 1969. He then went to Cornell University in Ithaca, New York, where he received a PhD in astrophysics for his research on the acceleration of the solar wind in 1973, under the supervision of Thomas Gold. After his return to ETH Zurich as a postdoc, he focused on plasma physical processes in the solar corona. He led the Research Group on Radio Astronomy at the Institute for Astronomy from 1974 to 2010. In 1974 he became a lecturer at the Physics Department and in 1994 he was nominated professor for physics with focus on astrophysics. He is professor emeritus at ETH Zurich since 2010 and continues to work at the Institute for Particle Physics and Astrophysics and part-time at Fachhochschule Nordwestschweiz (FHNW) in Windisch, Switzerland.

== Research and achievements ==
Benz is well known for his observations and interpretation of the solar radio emission (ultra high frequency) published in more than 300 refereed articles. Short and extremely bright bursts of radio emission are caused by elementary particles accelerated in solar and stellar flares. The Güdel-Benz relation between radio and X-ray emission of flares was named after him. Together with his student Säm Krucker Benz first detected heating events in the solar atmosphere that are now considered the most promising explanation for the high temperature of the corona. Benz served as Principal Co-Investigator of the Herschel Space Observatory (ESA). He and his team used it to observe molecular lines in regions of current star formation. They were able to infere the intensity of the ionizing radiation from the abundances of CH+, OH+, H2O+, C+, H3O+, and SH+.

Benz presided several scientific committees, such as the Swiss Society for Astrophysics and Astronomy (1999–2002) and Division II (Sun and Heliosphere) of the International Astronomical Union (2000–2003). Benz was relevant in the early history of CESRA, the Community of European Solar Radio Astronomers, promoting studies of solar radio physics, interplanetary medium, and related topics. When it became clear in 1978 that a large European interferometer was not feasible, the goal of CESRA changed from building an instrument to analyzing data from existing telescopes and to theory. Benz was elected to be "caretaker" of this transition phase. It ended in 1992 with converting the project committee into an association, headed by Benz until 1998. Benz was Principal Investigator of the STIX Instrument (hard X-ray imager) on the Solar Orbiter Mission in the start phase of 2006-2011.

To the public at large, Arnold Benz is known for his numerous presentations on astronomy at the popular level, most prominently on Swiss television and radio since 1979.

Benz takes part in the interdisciplinary dialog between natural sciences and religion. He emphasizes the new perspectives that today's astrophysical findings open up for the concept of divine creation. However, he highlights that this belief is based on participating perceptions and religious experiences in human life. They are subjective and fundamentally different from scientific observations. Nevertheless, they constitute a substantial part of what we call reality. Scientific knowledge and belief in creation meet in a sense of wonder, pointing believers toward the Creator. Benz describes such encounters in poetic form (Astronomical Psalms).

In 2011 he received an honorary doctorate from the Faculty of Theology of the University of Zurich for his merits in interdisciplinary work. The University of the South (Sewanee, TN, USA) awarded him 2017 an honorary doctor's degree in Science "for his distinguished contributions to astronomical inquiry and for his illuminating, interdisciplinary reflections".

== Books and articles (selection) ==
- Plasma Astrophysics. Kinetic Processes in Solar and Stellar Coronae. 2nd ed. Kluwer, Dordrecht 2002, ISBN 1-4020-0695-0
- Astrophysics and Creation: Perceiving the Universe Through Science and Participation. Crossroad Publishing, New York 2016, ISBN 978-0824522131.
- The Future of the Universe: Chance, Chaos, God? second edition, Continuum Publishing, New York 2002, ISBN 978-3-8436-0074-3.
- Meaningless Space? in : George, Mark/ Pezzoli-Olgiati, Daria (eds.), Meaningful Spaces. Religious Representations in Place, New York: Palgrave Macmillan, 23–34 (2014).
- Astrophysics and Creation: Perceiving the Universe Through Science and Participation. Zygon: Journal of Religion and Science, 52, 186-195 (2017).
- Mission to Saturn: The Story of a Debate about Science and God. (with Samuel Vollenweider) Crossroad Publishing, New York 2022, ISBN 978-0-8245-5055-4.
- Astronomical Psalms - For a Vast Universe. Crossroad Publishing, New York 2025, ISBN 978-0-8245-9526-5.
