= Cocconi Prize =

Biennial astrophysics and cosmology award

The Giuseppe and Vanna Cocconi Prize is awarded by the High Energy and Particle Physics Division (EPS-HEPP) of the European Physical Society (EPS) to commemorate the two Italian physicists. The Prize is awarded biennially for outstanding experimental, theoretical or technological contribution to astroparticle physics and cosmology.

The prize is awarded during the EPS conference on high-energy physics, together with the other prizes awarded by EPS-HEPP: High Energy and Particle Physics Prize, the Gribov Medal, the Young Experimental Physicist Prize and the Outreach Prize.

The Cocconi Prize is the EPS’ highest honor in astroparticle physics and is comparable in prestige to the American Astronomical Society’s Rossi Prize. In 2017, Rainer Weiss, Kip Thorne, and Barry Barish received the Nobel Prize in physics few months after they had got the Cocconi Prize. The same applies to Art McDonald, who received the Cocconi Prize in 2013 and two years later the Nobel Prize.

The prize was established in 2011 when the estate of Giuseppe Cocconi and Vanna Tongiorgi Cocconi, prominent italian physicists with outstanding career in cosmic rays and at CERN (Giuseppe Cocconi was research director from 1967 to 1969), donated for the creation of a prize in the area of particle astrophysics and cosmology.

Nominations for the award may be submitted through an open call for nominations issued by the EPS-HEPP, usually in January of odd years. Selection of the prize recipients will be made by the division and proposed to the president of the EPS, who will officially announce the name(s) of the winner(s).

== Recipients ==
- 2025, Fermi-LAT and Fermi-GBM collaborations, "for revolutionizing the field of gamma-ray astronomy, providing the detection and catalogs of thousands of new gamma-ray sources including pulsars, the first detection of an electromagnetic counterpart to a neutrino IceCube event, the identification of more than two thousand gamma ray bursts, and the first detection of the electromagnetic counterpart to the gravitational wave event GW170817 from the merger of two neutron stars".
- 2023, SDSS/BOSS/eBOSS collaborations, "for their outstanding contributions to observational cosmology, including the development of the baryon acoustic oscillation measurement into a prime cosmological tool, using it to robustly probe the history of the expansion rate of the Universe back to 1/5th of its age providing crucial information on dark energy, the Hubble constant, and neutrino masses".
- 2021, Borexino Collaboration, " for the ground-breaking observation of solar neutrinos from the pp chain and CNO cycle that provided unique and comprehensive tests of the Sun as a nuclear fusion engine".
- 2019, WMAP and Planck Collaborations, "for providing high-precision measurements of the cosmic microwave background temperature and polarization anisotropies, leading to detailed information on properties of the universe and tests of cosmological models and fundamental physics".
- 2017, Rainer Weiss, Kip S. Thorne, Barry C. Barish, "for their pioneering and leading roles in the LIGO observatory that led to the direct detection of gravitational waves, opening a new window to the Universe".
- 2015, Francis Halzen, "for his visionary and leading role in the detection of very high-energy extraterrestrial neutrinos, opening a new observational window on the Universe".
- 2013, Arthur B.McDonald and Yoichiro Suzuki, "for their outstanding contributions to the solution of the solar neutrino puzzle by measuring the flux of all neutrino flavors from the Sun with the SNO and Super-Kamiokande experiments."
- 2011, Paolo de Bernardis and Paul Richards, "for their outstanding contributions to the study of cosmic microwave background anisotropies with the balloon-borne experiments BOOMERanG and MAXIMA".
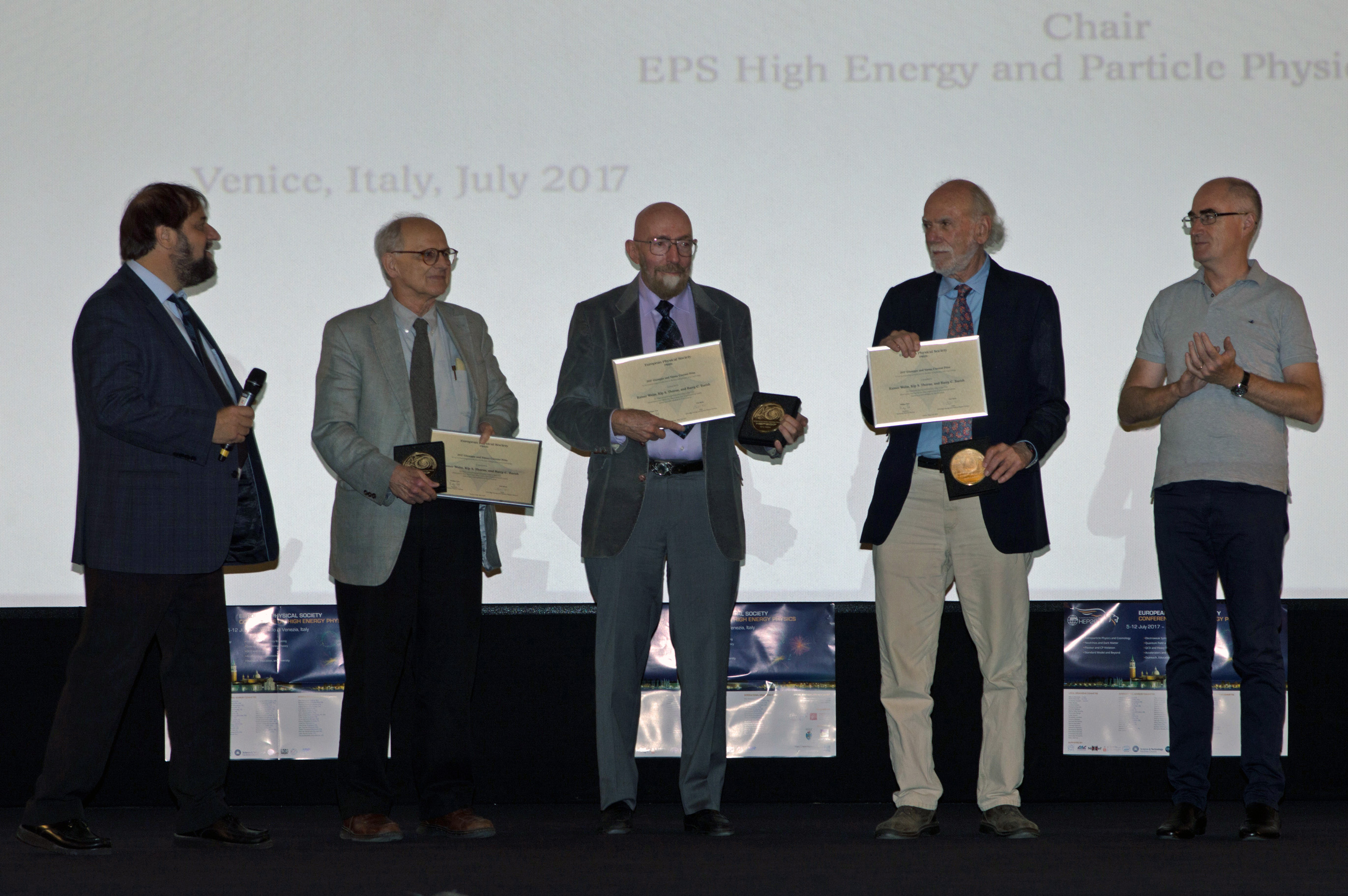
Award ceremony for the Cocconi Prize winners at the 2017 EPS High Energy Physics conference, Lido di Venezia.

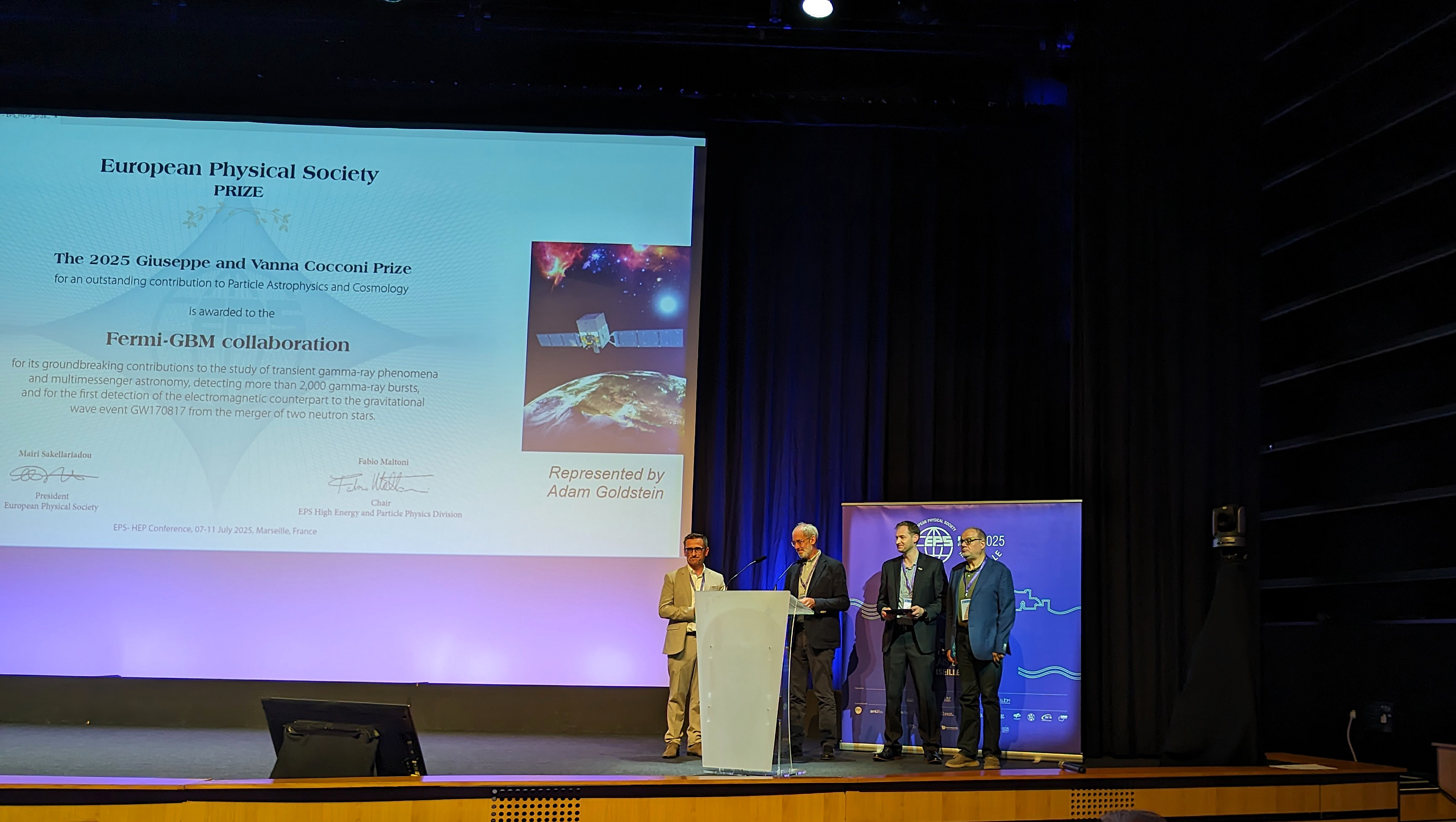
Award ceremony for the Cocconi Prize at the 2025 EPS High Energy Physics conference, Marseille.

== See also ==
- List of physics awards
