= European Solar Physics Division =

- Abbreviation: ESPD
- Formation: 1974
- Type: Learned society
- Purpose: Promote solar physics and represent European solar physicists
- President: Istvan Ballai
- Parent organization: EPS
- Website: solar.epsdivisions.org
- Formerly called: Joint Astrophysics Division (JAD) of EPS and EAS.

The European Solar Physics Division (ESPD) of the European Physical Society (EPS), is an organisation whose purpose is to promote solar physics and represent European scientists interested in the physics of the Sun. The ESPD is known mostly for its organisation of the European Solar Physics Meetings, which bring together European solar physicists and take place every three years.

Since 2017, the ESPD has awarded four prizes: the Zdeněk Švetka Senior Prize for outstanding contributions over an extended period of time to solar physics, the Giancarlo Noci Early Career Prize for outstanding contributions to solar physics from an Early career researcher, the Patricia Edwin PhD Prize for the best European PhD thesis in solar physics and the Kees Zwaan Inspirational Community Prize for services to the community.

== History ==
In 1974, solar physicists in Europe recognised the need for common meetings and the "European Solar Meeting Organising Committee" was created, with the first European Solar Physics Meeting organised in 1975. This meeting was attended by more than 200 solar physicists, and during the meeting it was decided to proceed with the creation of a Solar Physics Section (SPS) as part of the Astronomy and Astrophysics Division of the EPS.

In 1990, the European Astronomical Society (EAS) was founded, and the SPS became a section of the Joint Astrophysics Division (JAD) of EPS and EAS. In 2009 the SPS became the European Solar Physics Division, an EPS division in its own right.

== Meetings ==
The ESPD organises the European Solar Physics Meeting (ESPM), the largest meeting of solar physics in Europe. The meetings are held every three years. The following European Solar Physics Meetings have taken place:

- 1975: ESPM-1, Florence, Italy
- 1978: ESPM-2, Toulouse, France
- 1981: ESPM-3, Oxford, United Kingdom
- 1984: ESPM-4, Noordwijkerhout, Netherlands
- 1987: ESPM-5, Titisee, Germany
- 1990: ESPM-6, Debrecen, Hungary
- 1993: ESPM-7, Catania, Italy
- 1996: ESPM-8, Thessaloniki, Greece
- 1999: ESPM-9, Florence, Italy
- 2002: ESPM-10, Prague, Czech Republic
- 2005: ESPM-11, Leuven, Belgium
- 2008: ESPM-12, Freiburg, Germany
- 2011: ESPM-13, Rhodes, Greece
- 2014: ESPM-14, Dublin, Ireland
- 2017: ESPM-15, Budapest, Hungary
- 2021: ESPM-16, virtual conference
- 2024: ESPM-17, Turin, Italy

Besides the European Solar Physics Meeting, the ESPD has also been associated with the organisation of the China–Europe Solar Physics Meeting. The following meetings have taken place:

- 2016: 1st China–Europe Solar Physics Meeting, Kunming, China
- 2018: 2nd China-Europe Solar Physics Meeting, Hvar, Croatia

== Summer Schools ==
The ESPD organises the ESPD Summer School in Solar Physics every two years. The following ESPD Summer Schools have taken place

- 2024 ESPD Summer School on Energisation and heating in the solar plasma, Dubrovnik, Croatia

== See also ==
- List of astronomical societies
