= Tejinder Virdee =

British physicist

Sir Tejinder (Jim) Virdee FRS
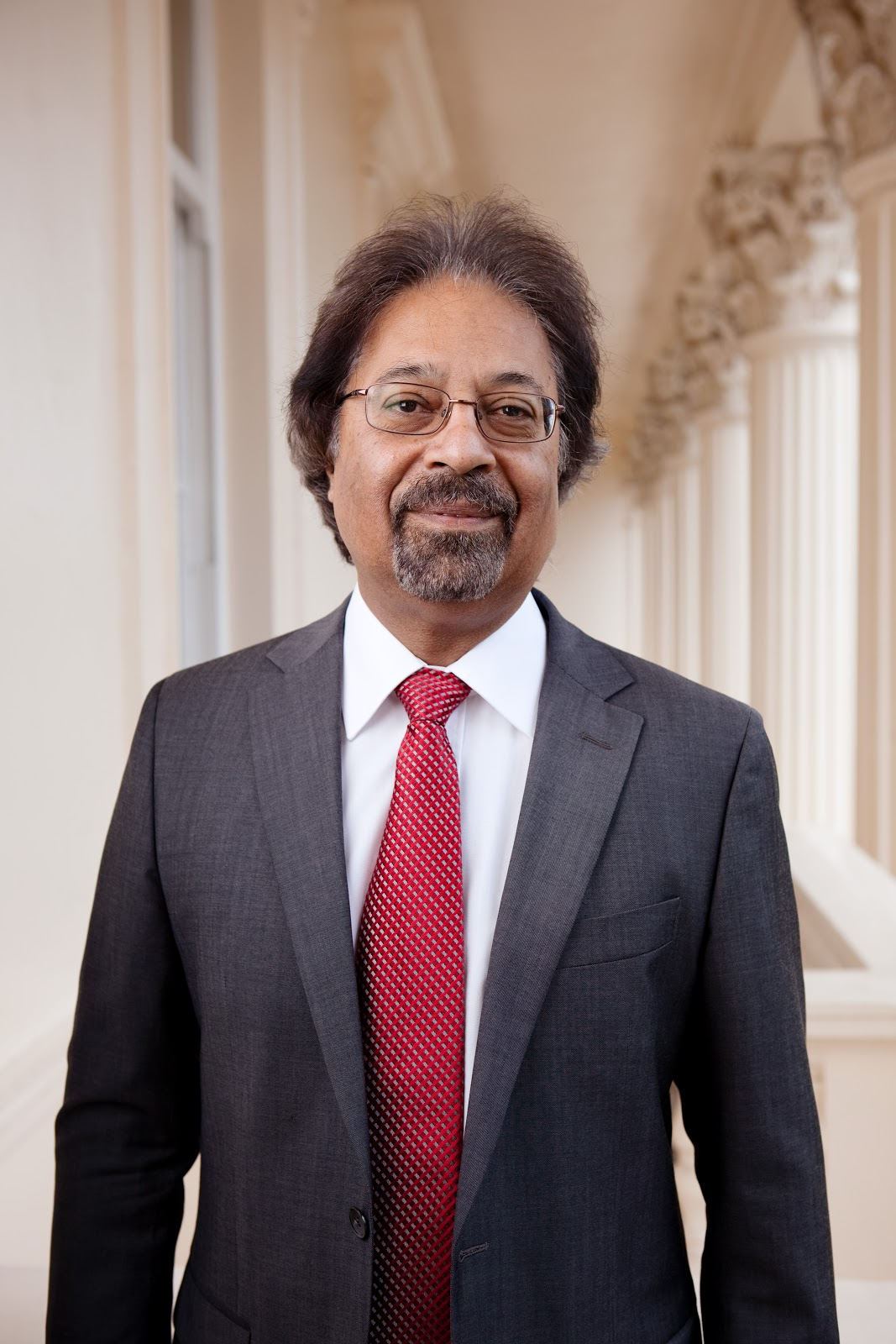
- Tejinder Virdee on the balcony of the Royal Society in July, 2012
- Born: Tejinder Singh Virdee; 13 October 1952 (age 74); Nyeri, Kenya Colony
- Education: Queen Mary College, University of London (B.Sc.); Imperial College London (Ph.D.)
- Known for: Originating the concept and overseeing the construction of CMS
- Awards: IOP Chadwick Medal and Prize (2009); Special Breakthrough Prize in Fundamental Physics (2013); EPS HEPP Prize (2013); IOP; Knight Bachelor (2014); Glazebrook Medal (2015); APS Panofsky Prize (2017); Royal Medal (2024)
- Scientific career
- Fields: Physics (particle physics)
- Workplaces: Imperial College London
- Thesis: Sigma Hyperon Production in a Triggered Bubble Chamber (1979)
- Doctoral advisor: Peter Dornan FRS

Sir Tejinder Singh Virdee, FRS (Punjabi: ਤਜਿੰਦਰ ਸਿੰਘ ਵਿਰਦੀ, born 13 October 1952), is a Kenyan-born British experimental particle physicist and Professor of Physics at Imperial College London. He is best known for originating the concept of the Compact Muon Solenoid (CMS) alongside a few other colleagues and has been referred to as one of the 'founding fathers' of the project. CMS is a world-wide collaboration which started in 1991 and now has over 3500 participants from 50 countries.

In recognition of his work on CMS, Virdee has been awarded numerous prizes and distinctions. In 2007, he was awarded the IOP High Energy Particle Physics group prize and in 2009 the IOP Chadwick Medal and Prize. In 2012 he was elected Fellow of the Royal Society and Honorary Fellow of the Institute of Physics (IOP). In 2013 he was awarded the Special Breakthrough Prize in Fundamental Physics for "leadership in the scientific endeavour that led to the discovery of the new Higgs-like particle by the ATLAS and CMS collaborations at CERN's Large Hadron Collider (LHC)", and the European Physical Society High Energy and Particle Physics Prize.

In 2015 he was awarded the IOP Glazebrook Medal and Prize for his leadership of the Compact Muon Solenoid (CMS) experiment at the Large Hadron Collider (LHC) where evidence for the Higgs boson was revealed after 20 years of research involving design, construction and data-taking. In 2017 he was granted the American Physical Society Panofsky Prize for his pioneering work and outstanding leadership in the making of the CMS experiment, and in 2020 the Blaise Pascal Medal of the European Academy of Sciences in Physics. In 2024, he was awarded the Royal Medal (Physical) of the Royal Society. The citation reads: "for extraordinary leadership and profound impact on all phases of the monumental CMS experiment at the CERN Large Hadron Collider, including the crucial discovery of the Higgs boson through its decays to two photons."

In 2014, Virdee was knighted in the Queen's Birthday Honours list for services to science.

Virdee has served on Scientific Advisory Committees of numerous international physics institutes and on the Physical Sciences jury for the Infosys Prize in 2020.

== Early life and education ==
Tejinder Virdee was born in 1952 to Sikh parents Udham Kaur and Chain Singh Virdee in Nyeri, Kenya. Virdee went to school in Kisumu at the Kisumu Boys High School. Due to the prevailing circumstances in Kenya at the time, his family (of Indian Sikh origin) emigrated in 1967 to Birmingham, England. He credits part of his interest in physics to Howard Stockley, his physics teacher at King's Norton Boys' School, Birmingham, whom he describes as an 'inspirational teacher'. He also remembers visiting Birmingham Museum of Science and Industry, where he stumbled across a cloud chamber sparking his interest in the study of the structure of matter. Virdee obtained a B.Sc. in Physics from Queen Mary College, University of London in 1974.

== Research career ==
After completing his Ph.D. at Imperial College London, on an experiment conducted at the Stanford Linear Accelerator Center (SLAC) in California, he joined CERN in 1979 as a Fellow of the Experimental Physics Division. Virdee’s early scientific career (1979-1984) involved verifying the strange notion that the “quarks” (the constituents of the protons the neutrons and all other hadrons) carry fractional electric charge. This was successfully demonstrated by the NA14 photoproduction experiment at CERN in the mid-eighties. Following NA14 he joined the UA1 experiment at CERN's proton-antiproton collider (SPS) where his interest in high-performance calorimetry was developed, leading to his invention of a novel technique of collecting light in plastic scintillator-based calorimeters.

Towards the end of UA1, (1990) Virdee, with a few other colleagues, started planning an experiment based on a high field solenoid that would be able to identify the missing elements of the Standard Model (SM) and also to probe in full the physics of the TeV scale. This was to become the CMS experiment at the LHC, one of the most complex instruments science has ever seen. Since 1991 Virdee has played a crucial role in all phases of CMS. Over the last two decades this has covered conceptual design, intensive R&D, prototyping, construction, installation, commissioning, data-taking and finally physics exploitation. He has been the driving force behind many of the major technology decisions made in CMS, especially the selection of the calorimeter technologies. The CMS hadron calorimeter uses the technique he had invented earlier.

The possibility of discovering a Higgs-like boson played a crucial role in the conceptual design of CMS, and served as a benchmark to test the performance of the experiment. In 1992, at a meeting in Evian, entitled ‘Towards the LHC Experimental Programme’ meeting, Virdee championed the case for the selection of CMS amongst four competing experiment conceptual designs. After much deliberation, CERN’s LHC experiments peer-review committee, the LHCC, eventually chose two, one being the CMS design. In 1990 Virdee and a colleague, Christopher Seez, carried out the first detailed simulation studies of the most plausible way to detect the SM Higgs boson in the low-mass region in the environment of the LHC: via its decay into two photons. After intensive R&D Virdee argued that dense scintillating crystals offer the best possibility of achieving excellent energy resolution. In 1994, he made a compelling case for the use of lead tungstate scintillating crystals (PbWO_{4}) for the electromagnetic calorimeter of CMS as being the most promising detector for the discovery of the Higgs boson via its two-photon decay mode. He made the case within the CMS experiment, to CERN’s Management and to the LHCC. He led the team that proved the viability of this technique, a technique that has played a crucial role in the discovery of the new heavy boson, in July 2012. Virdee was deeply involved in the data analysis for the search for the Higgs boson, especially via its two-photon decay mode whose analysis was very much along the lines described in the study above. CMS’ signal for the discovery of the Higgs boson was the strongest in this decay mode.

Virdee was the deputy project leader of CMS between 1993 and 2006 and was then elected project leader (Spokesperson) in January 2007 for a period of three years. He oversaw the final stages of construction, installation and data taking with the first collisions at the LHC.

Virdee is a major voice in arguing for the long-term future of the LHC accelerator and its experiments. An increase in the interaction rate by almost a factor of around ten is being advocated for the CMS and ATLAS experiments. To benefit fully from this luminosity increase the CMS detector will be upgraded. Virdee is leading efforts to replace the detector's endcaps with a novel silicon-based technology that measures the energy and momentum of particles to unprecedented levels of precision.

Beyond his contributions to particle physics he is a promoter of science and education, especially in Africa. He funds science-related education activities in schools and universities in Africa, India and the United Kingdom.

== Invited lectures and outreach ==
Virdee has given several keynote speeches at international conferences, opening or closing addresses at particle physics conferences and public lectures on the LHC Project. These include the 2007 Schrödinger Lecture, the 2012 Peter Lindsay Lectures at Imperial College, the 16th Kaczmarczik Lecture at Drexel University, Philadelphia in 2011, the Keynote Speech at the 2009 Intel International Science and Engineering Fair, Reno, USA and joint lectures on the LHC Project with Prof. Edward Witten in Philadelphia, U.S.A. (2008) and Split, Croatia (2009).

Amongst his interviews are a dialogue with A. C. Grayling, and an interview with Jim Al-Khalili on the BBC Radio 4 programme “The Life Scientific”.

== Professional Awards ==
- 2024 Awarded the Royal Medal of the Royal Society.
- 2020 Awarded the Blaise Pascal Medal of the European Academy of Sciences in Physics.
- 2018 Awarded Doctor of Science (honoris causa) by Panjab University, Chandigarh, India.
- 2017 Awarded the Panofsky Prize of the American Physical Society.
- 2015 Awarded the Institute of Physics Richard Glazebrook Medal and Prize.
- 2013 Awarded the High Energy Particle Physics Prize by the European Physical Society.
- 2013 Awarded Doctor of Science (honoris causa) by University of Lyon.
- 2013 Awarded Doctor of Science (honoris causa) by Queen Mary University of London, his alma mater.
- 2012 Awarded the 2013 Special Breakthrough Prize in Fundamental Physics.
- 2009 Awarded the Institute of Physics James Chadwick Medal and Prize.

== Bibliography ==
=== Public Lectures ===
- 2018 "Exploring Nature Moments after the Big Bang", H. C. Hans Memorial Lecture, 5 March 2018, Panjab University, Chandigarh, India.
- 2016 "The Long Road to the Higgs boson and Beyond”, J. N. Tata Memorial Lecture, IISc Bangalore, India.
- 2016 “The Long Road to the Higgs boson and Beyond”, Alan Astbury Lecture, Victoria, Canada.
- 2013 "The Quest for the Higgs boson at the LHC: A Historical Perspective”, Barcelona, Spain
- 2012 Peter Lindsay Lectures at Imperial College.
- 2012 Special lecture on the discovery of the Higgs Boson at Imperial College London (video).
- 2012 “Searching for the Higgs boson”, Cheltenham Science Festival, U.K.
- 2011 “Exploring Nature Moments after the Big Bang: The LHC Accelerator and the CMS Experiment”, 16th Kaczmarczik Lecture, Drexel University, Philadelphia, U.S.A.
- 2009 “Discovering the Quantum Universe; The LHC Project at CERN”, Keynote Speaker at the Intel Science and Engineering Fair in Reno, U.S.A. (video)
- 2008 “Discovering the Quantum Universe; The LHC Project at CERN”, International Conference on High Energy Physics, Philadelphia, USA with Prof. E. Witten.
- 2007 “Discovering the Quantum Universe: The Large Hadron Collider Project at CERN”, 20th Schrodinger Lecture, Centennial of Imperial College: London, U.K. (video)

=== Video and Radio ===
- 2013 Participated in workshops promoting science education in Africa to Secondary Schools students with the BBC World Service programmes for “BBC Festival of Science Africa”, broadcast from Makerere University, Kampala, Uganda. (audio)
- 2012 Featured on the BBC Radio programme, “Life Scientific”, that discusses the scientific life of individual scientists, 20 March 2012. (audio)
- 2009 Dialogue on the LHC project and CMS with Prof. A. C. Grayling, broadcast on BBC World Service programme “Exchanges at the Frontier”. (audio | video)

=== Other Recognition ===
- 2015 Awarded the Outstanding Achievement in Science and Technology award at The Asian Awards
- 2014 Asian Achievers Awards: Professional of the Year.
- 2013 GG2 Award.
- 2010 The Sikh Awards: Sikhs in Education.
- 2010 Named 62nd in “EUREKA 100: The Science List” - The London Times' 100 most important figures in British science.
- 2007 Named in the list of “100 Personalities that make Swiss Romandie”; l’Hebdo magazine, Switzerland.

== See also ==
- List of British Sikhs
