= CERN Courier =

Trade magazine

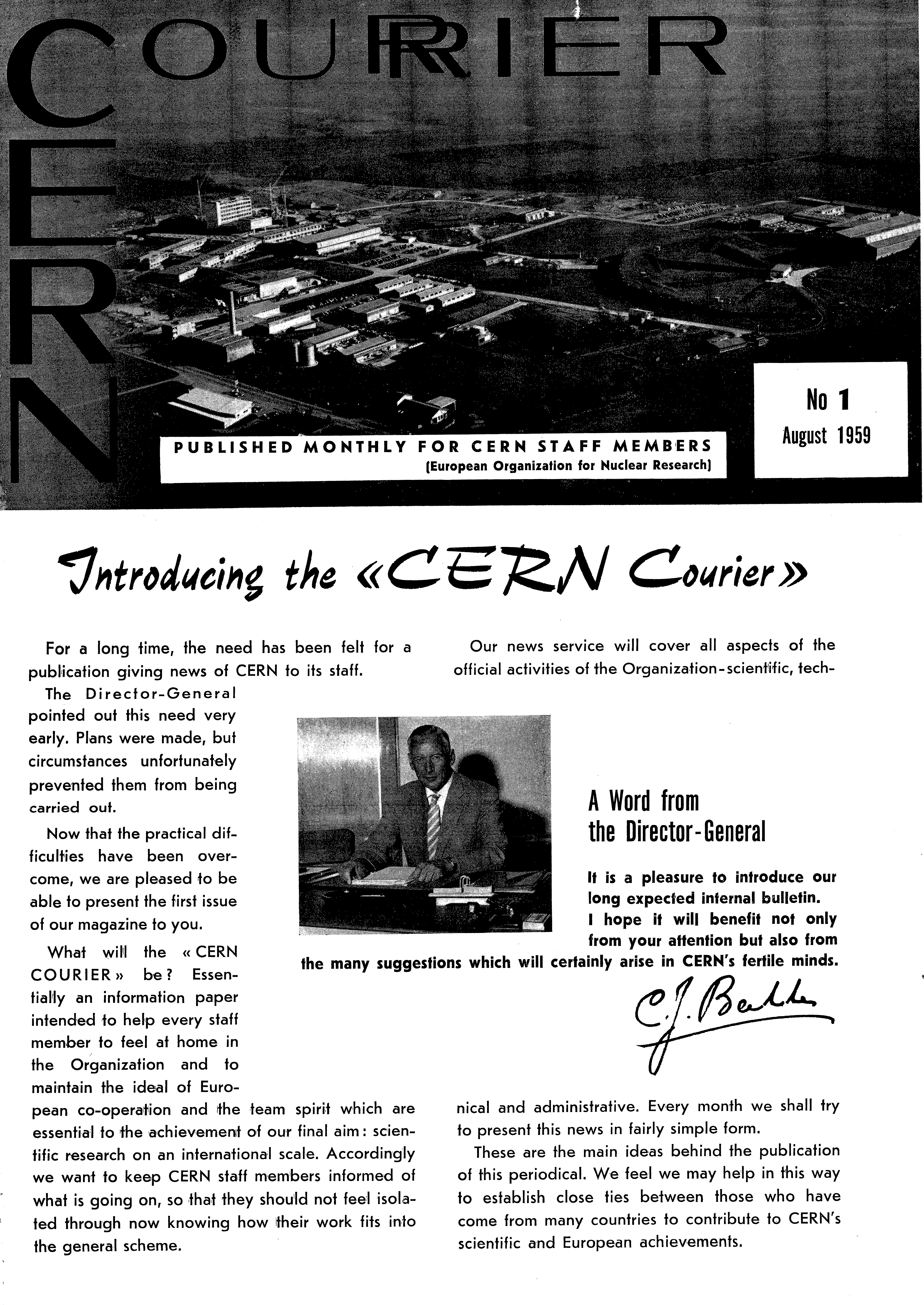
- Categories: High-energy physics
- Frequency: 6/year
- Publisher: CERN
- First issue: 1959
- Country: Switzerland
- Based in: Geneva
- Language: English, French
- Website: https://cerncourier.com
- ISSN: 0304-288X (print); 2077-9550 (web)

CERN Courier (or sometimes CERN Courier: International Journal of High Energy Physics) is a bi-monthly trade magazine covering current developments in high-energy physics and related fields worldwide. It was established in 1959. Initially the Courier was focused on communicating to CERN employees, but in 1962 the focus expanded to communicating CERN news outside of the organization. By 1965 most of the content was for external readers.

From October 1998 to December 2024 the magazine was published by IOP Publishing on behalf of CERN. As of January 2025 the magazine is again published by CERN. Up to volume 45 no. 5 (2005) the magazine was published both in English and French. The French edition was published under the title Courrier CERN : Revue internationale de la physique des hautes énergies. Currently it is a single-language edition where articles are published either in French or English with an abstract in the other language, although most articles are in English. CERN Courier is distributed to member-state governments, institutes and laboratories affiliated with CERN, and to their personnel. As of 2019 the magazine is published bi-monthly, prior to this there were typically ten to twelve issues per year. The views expressed are not necessarily those of the CERN management.

== Distribution and coverage ==
The CERN Courier team in 1979. From left to right, Henri-Luc Felder (French edition editor), Monika Wilson (distribution and administrative matters), Brian Southworth (editor), Micheline Falciola (advertisement and printer liaison), and Gordon Fraser (English edition editor).

The first editor, Roger Anthoine, started CERN Courier with an initial print run of 1000, and by the time he had to put it on hold, little more than a year later, the number had already risen to 3000. In 2015 some 21,000 copies are printed 10 times a year and the journal claimed almost 22,000 monthly readers online. Over the years, particularly with the advent of the CERN Bulletin in 1965, the CERN Courier evolved from being a house publication to become a scientific journal. The Courier thus became the ambassador of CERN and particle physics to a large community of knowledgeable specialists and inquisitive people, having been rebranded in 1975 with the subtitle International Journal of High-Energy Physics.

In addition to news and events, CERN Courier will often present cover pieces on influential physicists or retrospectives of significant historical moments in high-energy-physics history. Book reviews, white papers, obituaries, and product releases are also featured in the magazine.

== Editors over time ==
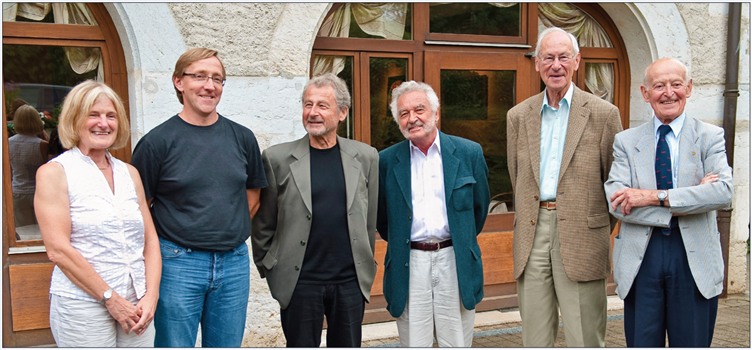
The first six principal editors, in 2009. From left to right: Christine Sutton, James Gillies, Gordon Fraser, Brian Southworth, Alec Hester, Roger Anthoine

The CERN Courier has been published regularly since the start, apart from the period April 1960 to January 1962 when the magazine "hibernated" owing to unfortunate circumstances. The magazine has been edited by the following editors:

- Roger Anthoine (1959–1961)
- Alec Hester (1962–1965)
- Brian Southworth (1966–1985)
- Gordon Fraser (1986–2001)
- James Gillies (2002–2003)
- Christine Sutton (2003–2015)
- Antonella Del Rosso (2015–2016)
- Matthew Donald Chalmers (2016–2024)
- Mark Alastair Rayner (2024–2026)
- Davide De Biasio (2026–today)
