= European Physical Society =

Non-profit science organization

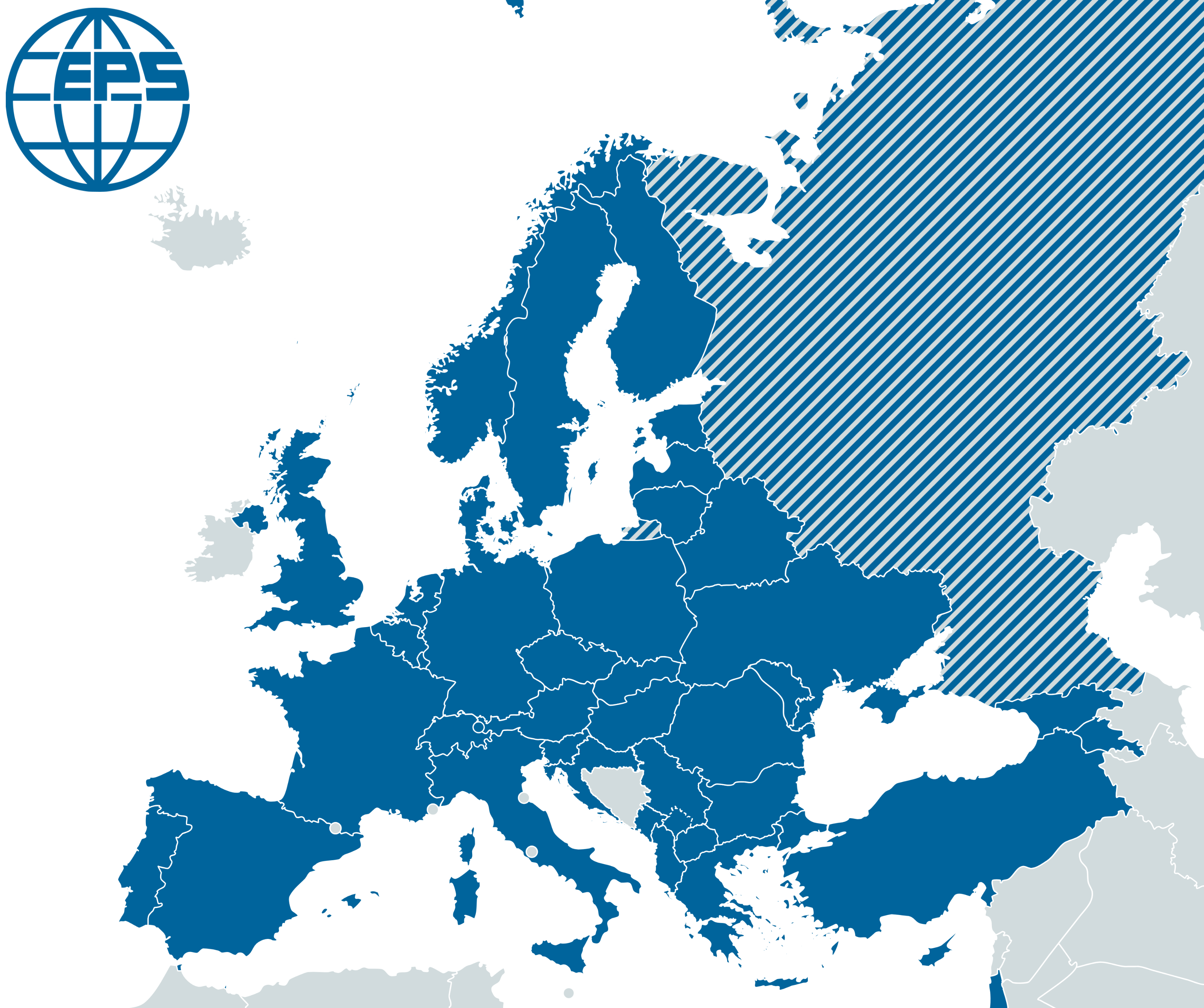
- Abbreviation: EPS
- Formation: 1968
- Purpose: Promote physics and physicists in Europe
- Location(s): Mulhouse, France (1997-Present); Geneva, Switzerland (1968-1997)
- President: José Maria de Teresa
- Website: www.eps.org

The European Physical Society (EPS) is a non-profit organisation whose purpose is to promote physics and physicists in Europe through methods such as physics outreach, supporting physicists to engage in the design and implementation of European science policy, and advocating physics research. Formally established in 1968, its membership includes the national physical societies of 42 countries, and some 3200 individual members. The Deutsche Physikalische Gesellschaft, the world's largest and oldest organisation of physicists, is a major member.

== History ==
In 1966, Gilberto Bernardini, then president of the Italian Physical Society, convened a meeting of 80 European physicists in Pisa to discuss possibly forming a Pan-European Physical Society. There was agreement in such a society existed, but disagreement about its form which led to the establishment of a Steering Committee. They would attempt to determine if a federation of national physical societies or an independent society with direct personal membership would be the preferred form for the European Physical Society. In a May 1967 meeting in London determined the European Physical Society should be a loose federation of physical societies, and that it should be a service organization, which means it would organize conferences, coordinate European physics publications, and be a communication channel rather than attempting to organize physics research in Europe. On the 26th of September 1968 in Geneva, the European Physical Society was legally incorporated.

== Governance ==
The EPS Council is held annually and reviews the activities of the EPS, discusses priorities and approves annual accounts; it has representatives from each of the 42 member societies as well as the 11 divisions and seven groups. Associate and individual members are represented by five delegates elected from their respective groups of members. Delegates are elected for four-year terms, and the elections typically take place between January and March.

The executive committee is elected by the EPS Council for a two-year term, with a term limit of two. It is made up of a president, who is the president of the society and chairman of the council, a vice-president, a member from each member society with an effective membership greater than or equal to 10,000, three members elected from each other member society, four members elected from divisions and groups, one member elected from individual members, and one member elected from the associate members. Additionally, a secretary and treasurer exists as part of the executive committee.

The president must also serve as the vice-president the year before and after their two-year term. No one may serve more than one term as president.

Additionally, the EPS General Meeting occurs every three years.

== Publications ==
Its letters journal is EPL; its other publications include Europhysics News and the European Journal of Physics.

=== Europhysics News ===
Europhysics News is a magazine owned by the European Physical Society, and produced in collaboration with EDP Sciences. It publishes review articles, advanced topic features, and reports to aid European Physicists. The current editor-in-chief is Antigone Marino, and Ferenc Igloi is a Science Editor for the magazine.

== Conferences ==
One of its main activities is organizing international conferences.

The EPS sponsors conferences other than the Europhysics Conference, like the International Conference of Physics Students in 2011.

== Units ==
=== Committees ===
Committees are groups entrusted with special tasks which are appointed by the executive committee.

The following committees are part of the EPS:

- Conference Committee
- Distinctions and Awards Committee
- EPS Historic Sites Selection Committee
- Equal Opportunities
- European Integration
- Executive Committee
- Forum Physics and Society
- Young Minds Committee

=== Divisions ===
Divisions normally focus on specific physics disciplines. The current Divisions of the EPS are:

- Atomic, Molecular and Optical Physics Division
- Condensed Matter Division
- Environmental Physics Division
- Gravitational Physics Division
- High Energy Particle Physics Division
- Nuclear Physics Division
- Division of Physics in Life Sciences
- Physics Education Division
- Plasma Physics Division
- Quantum Electronics and Optics Division
- European Solar Physics Division
- Statistical & Nonlinear Physics Division

=== Groups ===
Groups normally focus on general issues within physics. The current Groups of the EPS are:

- Accelerator Group
- Computational Physics Group
- Energy Group
- History of Physics Group
- Physics for Development Group
- Technology and Innovation Group

== Prizes ==
The EPS awards a number of prizes, including the Edison Volta Prize, the EPS Europhysics Prize, the EPS Statistical and Nonlinear Physics Prizes, the High Energy and Particle Physics Prize, the EPS Emmy Noether Distinction for Women in Physics, the Rolf Wideroe Prize, the Gribov Medal, the Cocconi Prize, the Young Experimental Physicist Prize, the Outreach Prize.

=== Historic Sites ===
The Historic Sites Initiative launched towards the end of 2011, and was inspired by a similar initiative launched by the American Physical Society. The initiative is meant to commemorate places in Europe with significance to the development and the history of physics such as laboratories, and universities. As of September 2018, 41 sites are inaugurated in 21 different countries. Examples of recognized sites are the Blackett Laboratory (UK) in 2014, and the Residencia de Estudiantes (Spain) in 2015.

== Presidents ==
- 2026- : José Maria de Teresa (Spain)
- 2024–2026: Mairi Sakellariaou (United Kingdom)
- 2021–2024: Luc Bergé (France)
- 2019–2021: Petra Rudolf (Netherlands)
- 2017–19: Rüdiger Voss (Switzerland)
- 2015–17: C. Rossel (Switzerland)
- 2013–15: John M. Dudley (France)
- 2011–13: Luisa Cifarelli (Italy)
- 2009–11: M. Kolwas (Poland)
- 2007–9: Friedrich Wagner (Germany)
- 2005–7: O. Poulsen (Denmark)
- 2003–5: M.C.E. Huber (Switzerland)
- 2001–3: M. Ducloy (France)
- 1999–2001: Arnold Wolfendale (United Kingdom)
- 1997–99: Denis Weaire (Ireland)
- 1995–97: Herwig Schopper (Germany)
- 1993–95: N. Kroo (Hungary)
- 1991–93: Maurice Jacob (Switzerland)
- 1988–91: R.A. Ricci (Italy)
- 1986–88: W. Buckel (Germany)
- 1984–86: G.H. Stafford (United Kingdom)
- 1982–84: Jacques Friedel (France)
- 1980–82: A.R. Mackintosh (Denmark)
- 1978–80: Antonino Zichichi (Italy)
- 1976–78: I. Ursu (Romania)
- 1972–76: H.B.G. Casimir (Netherlands)
- 1970–72: Erik Gustav Rydberg (Sweden)
- 1968–70: Gilberto Bernardini (Italy)
