= Project X =

Project X may refer to:

== Entertainment ==
- Project X, a novel by Jim Shepard
- A fictional weapon in the novel Atlas Shrugged
- Project X Entertainment, a production/financing company run by James Vanderbilt, William Sherak, and Paul Neinstein

== Film and TV ==
- Project X (1949 film), an American film
- Project X (1968 film), a science fiction film featuring Christopher George
- Project X (1987 film), a film starring Matthew Broderick
- Project X (2012 film), a comedy film about three teens who have a party that gets out of control
- Project X: Chôsensha tachi (2000–2005), a documentary television series hosted by NHK presenter Junko Kubo
- Project X (2016 film), an American short documentary film

== Music ==
- Project X (band), a 1987 short-lived band
- Project X: Iconic, a 2009 hip hop album by Tim Dog with Kool Keith and Mark Live
- Project X (Dark Moor album), 2015
- Project X (Ken Carson album), 2021
- Project X (Key Glock album), 2026

== Technology ==
- Project X (accelerator), a proposed high intensity proton accelerator at the Fermi National Accelerator Laboratory
- SIGSALY, an early secure speech system also known as "Project X"
- Code name of HotSauce, experimental visualization software developed by Apple Computer
- Original name of Nuon (DVD technology), a platform to enhance DVDs
- A small (A-segment) battery electric vehicle platform developed by the Mobility in Harmony Consortium

== Other ==
- Project-X, a 1992 scrolling shooter video game for the Amiga computer
- Project X, a warez group, scene release group that released Xbox games
- Project X Haren, an out of control birthday party which resulted in street riots in Haren, Netherlands, named after the 2012 Project X movie
- A military effort of the Army Foreign Intelligence Assistance Program
- A scandal involving Department of Homeland Security employee Laura Callahan
- An early code name for Walt Disney's EPCOT Project, now the Walt Disney World Resort
- Code name for the development of the Messerschmitt Me 163 World War II aircraft

== See also ==
- Weapon X (disambiguation)
