= RCB =

RCB may stand for:

- Reptilian Club Boyz, a former internet rap collective
- R Coronae Borealis variable, a type of eruptive variable star
- Ràdio Ciutat de Badalona, Barcelona, Spain
- RCB Bank, Cyprus
- A protein involved in chloroplast biogenesis
- Regional Centre for Biotechnology, India
- Regular Commissions Board, later the British Army Officer Selection Board
- Richards Bay Airport IATA code
- River City Brass, a brass band based in Pittsburgh
- Roberto Carballés Baena, a Spanish tennis player
- Royal Challengers Bengaluru, an Indian cricket franchise
  - Royal Challengers Bengaluru (WPL), an Indian Women's Premier League cricket franchise
- Rock Chuck Bullet Swage, a handloading equipment manufacturing company
- Racing Boy, Malaysian manufacturer for motorcycle aftermarket parts and accessories
