= Ag-Sb2S3 =

Ag-Sb_{2}S_{3}, also known as black silver, is a nanoporous plasmonic absorber and nanomaterial. The material was first discovered by a team at the National University of Singapore and is composed of silver, antimony, and sulfur. It is an inexpensive nanomaterial with a wide range of applications. Applications include biomolecule detectors and solar energy conversion. This is caused by the material having a strong absorption of light along with a structure that be engineered to optically detect traces of biomolecules.
