= Gamma-ray spectrometer =

Instrument for measuring gamma radiation

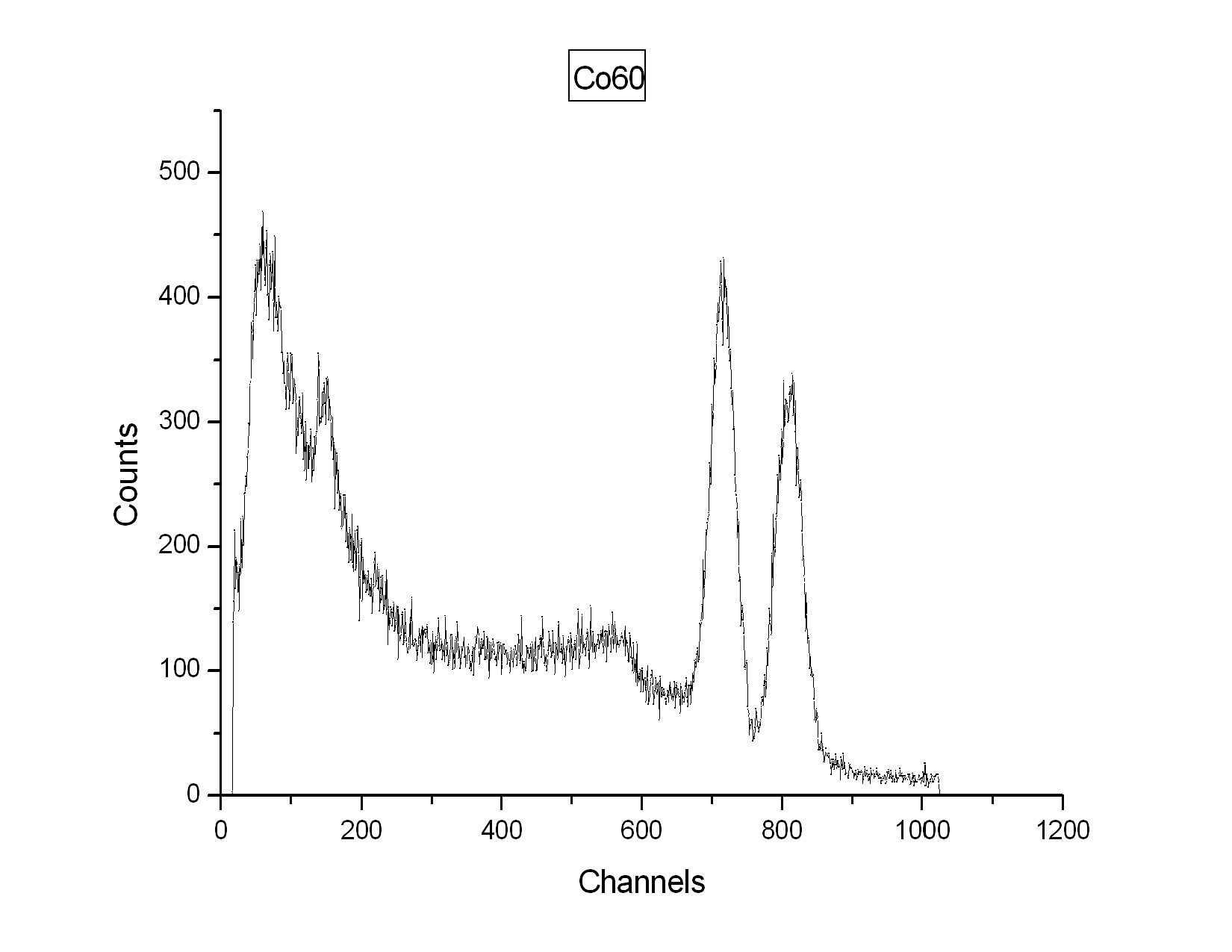
Spectrum of ^{60}Co; peaks at 1.17 and 1.33 MeV

A gamma-ray spectrometer (GRS) is an instrument for measuring the distribution (or spectrum—see figure) of the intensity of gamma radiation versus the energy of each photon. The study and analysis of gamma-ray spectra for scientific and technical use is called gamma spectroscopy, and gamma-ray spectrometers are the instruments which observe and collect such data. Because the energy of each photon of EM radiation is proportional to its frequency, gamma rays have sufficient energy that they are typically observed by counting individual photons.

Some notable gamma-ray spectrometers are Gammasphere, AGATA, and GRETINA.

== Gamma-ray spectroscopy ==
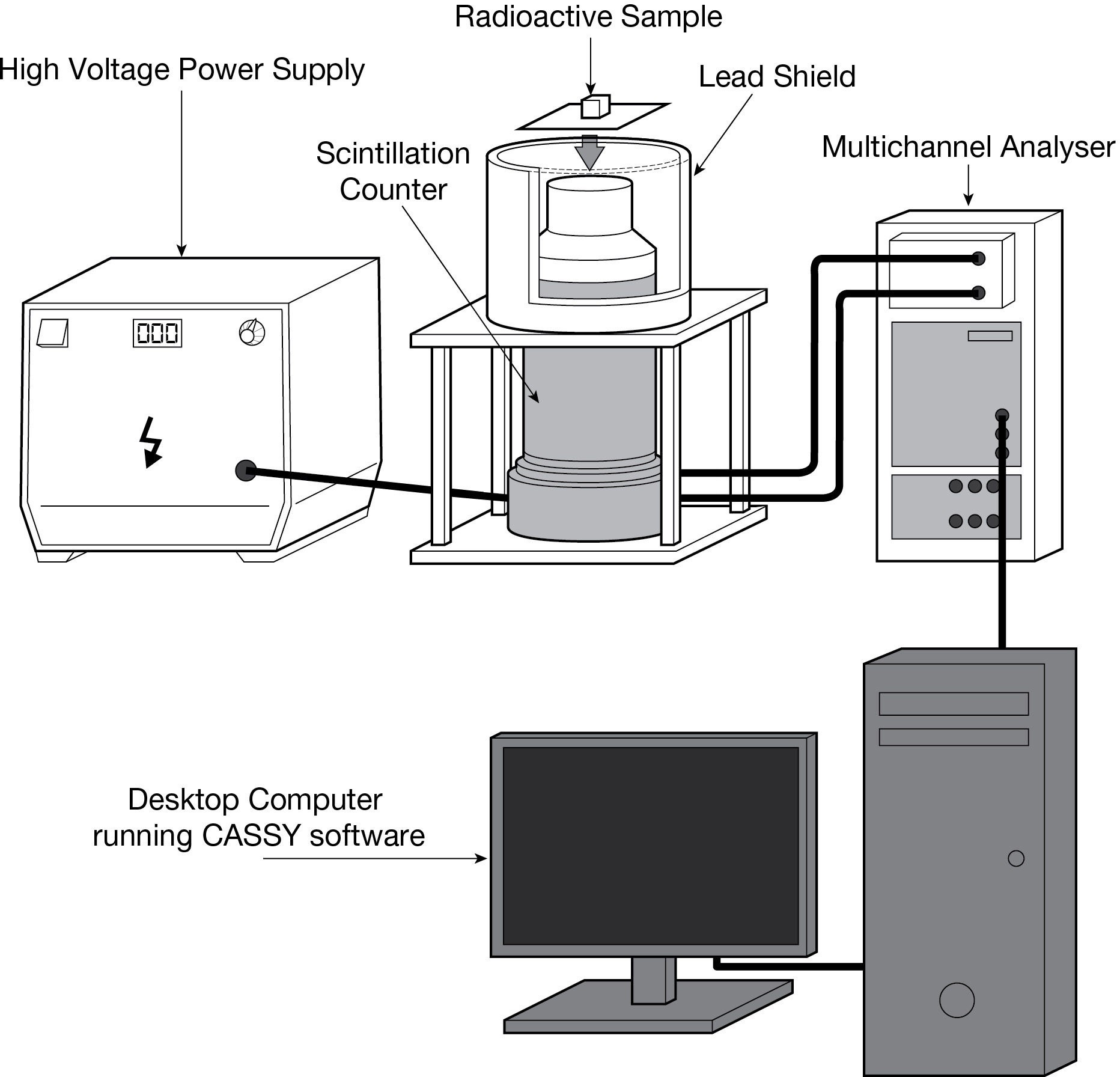
Laboratory equipment for determination of γ-radiation spectrum with a scintillation counter. The output from the scintillation counter goes to a Multichannel Analyser which processes and formats the data.

Atomic nuclei have an energy-level structure somewhat analogous to the energy levels of atoms, so that they may emit (or absorb) photons of particular energies, much as atoms do, but at energies that are thousands to millions of times higher than those typically studied in optical spectroscopy. (Note that photons in the short-wavelength high-energy end of the atomic spectroscopy energy range (few eV to few hundred keV), generally termed X-rays, overlaps somewhat with the low end of the nuclear gamma-ray range (~10 MeV to ~10 keV) so that the terminology used to distinguish X-rays from gamma rays can be arbitrary or ambiguous in the overlap region.) As with atoms, the particular energy levels of nuclei are characteristic of each species, so that the photon energies of the gamma rays emitted, which correspond to the energy differences of the nuclei, can be used to identify particular elements and isotopes. Distinguishing between gamma-rays of slightly different energy is an important consideration in the analysis of complex spectra, and the ability of a GRS to do so is characterized by the instrument's spectral resolution, or the accuracy with which the energy of each photon is measured. Semi-conductor detectors, based on cooled germanium or silicon detecting elements, have been invaluable for such applications. Because the energy level spectrum of nuclei typically dies out above about 10 MeV, gamma-ray instruments looking to still higher energies generally observe only continuum spectra, so that the moderate spectral resolution of scintillation (often sodium iodide (NaI) or caesium iodide, (CsI) spectrometers), often suffices for such applications.

== Astronomical spectrometers ==
A number of investigations have been performed to observe the gamma-ray spectra of the Sun and other astronomical sources, both galactic and extra-galactic. The Gamma-Ray Imaging Spectrometer, the Hard X-ray/Low-Energy Gamma-ray experiment (A-4) on HEAO 1, the Burst and Transient Spectrometry Experiment (BATSE) and the OSSI (Oriented Scintillation Spectrometer Experiment) on CGRO, the C1 germanium (Ge) gamma-ray instrument on HEAO 3, and the Ge gamma-ray spectrometer (SPI) on the ESA INTEGRAL mission are examples of cosmic spectrometers, while the GRS on the SMM and the imaging Ge spectrometer on the RHESSI satellite have been devoted to solar observations.

== Planetary gamma-ray spectrometers ==
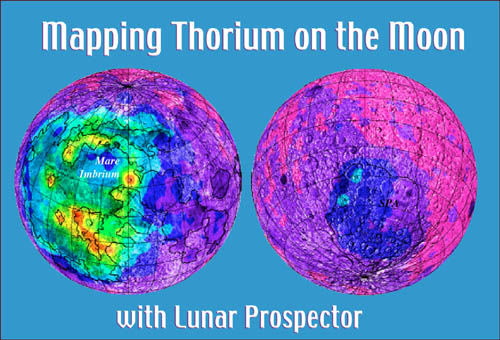
Lunar Prospector map of thorium on the Moon

Gamma-ray spectrometers have been widely used for the elemental and isotopic analysis of bodies in the Solar System, especially the Moon and Mars. These surfaces are subjected to a continual bombardment of high-energy cosmic rays, which excite nuclei in them to emit characteristic gamma-rays which can be detected from orbit. Thus an orbiting instrument can in principle map the surface distribution of the elements for an entire planet or other body, provided that it does not have an excessively thick atmosphere as is the case with Earth, Venus and the giant planets. Examples include the mapping of 20 elements observed in the exploration of Mars, Eros and the Moon. They are usually associated with neutron detectors that can look for water and ice in the soil by measuring neutrons. They are able to measure the abundance and distribution of about 20 primary elements of the periodic table, including silicon, oxygen, iron, magnesium, potassium, aluminum, calcium, sulfur, and carbon. Knowing what elements are at or near the surface will give detailed information about how planetary bodies have changed over time. To determine the elemental makeup of the Martian surface, Mars Odyssey uses a gamma-ray spectrometer and two neutron detectors.

GRS instruments supply data on the distribution and abundance of chemical elements, much as the Lunar Prospector mission did on the Moon. In this case, the chemical element thorium was mapped, with higher concentrations shown as yellow/orange/red in the left image.

=== How a GRS works ===
Some constructions of scintillation counters can be used as gamma-ray spectrometers. The gamma photon energy is discerned from the intensity of the flash of the scintillator, a number of low-energy photons produced by the single high-energy one. Another approach relies on using Germanium detectors - a crystal of hyperpure germanium that produces pulses proportional to the captured photon energy; while more sensitive, it has to be cooled to a low temperature, requiring a bulky cryogenic apparatus. Handheld and many laboratory gamma spectrometers are therefore the scintillator kind, mostly with thallium-doped sodium iodide, thallium-doped caesium iodide, or, more recently, cerium doped lanthanum bromide. Spectrometers for space missions conversely tend to be of the germanium kind.

When exposed to cosmic rays (charged particles from space thought to possibly originate in supernova and active galactic nuclei), chemical elements in soils and rocks emit uniquely identifiable signatures of energy in the form of gamma rays. The gamma-ray spectrometer looks at these signatures, or energies, coming from the elements present in the target soil.

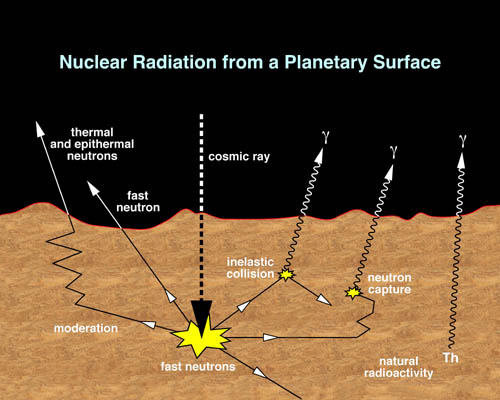

By measuring gamma rays coming from the target body, it is possible to calculate the abundance of various elements and how they are distributed around the planet's surface. Gamma rays, emitted from the nuclei of atoms, show up as sharp emission lines on the instrument's spectrum output. While the energy represented in these emissions determines which elements are present, the intensity of the spectrum reveals the elements concentrations. Spectrometers are expected to add significantly to the growing understanding of the origin and evolution of planets like Mars and the processes shaping them today and in the past.

Gamma rays and neutrons are produced by cosmic rays. Incoming cosmic rays—some of the highest-energy particles—collide with the nucleus of atoms in the soil. When nuclei are hit with such energy, neutrons are released, which scatter and collide with other nuclei. The nuclei get "excited" in the process, and emit gamma rays to release the extra energy so they can return to their normal rest state. Some elements like potassium, uranium, and thorium are naturally radioactive and give off gamma rays as they decay, but all elements can be excited by collisions with cosmic rays to produce gamma rays. The HEND and Neutron spectrometers on GRS directly detect scattered neutrons, and the gamma sensor detects the gamma rays.

=== Water detection ===
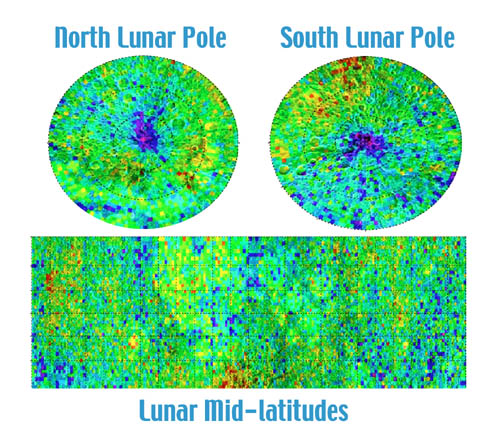

By measuring neutrons, it is possible to calculate the abundance of hydrogen, thus inferring the presence of water. The neutron detectors are sensitive to concentrations of hydrogen in the upper meter of the surface. When cosmic rays hit the surface of Mars, neutrons and gamma-rays come out of the soil. The GRS measured their energies. Certain energies are produced by hydrogen. Since hydrogen is most likely present in the form of water ice, the spectrometer will be able to measure directly the amount of permanent ground ice and how it changes with the seasons. Like a virtual shovel "digging into" the surface, the spectrometer will allow scientists to peer into this shallow subsurface of Mars and measure the existence of hydrogen.

GRS will supply data similar to that of the successful Lunar Prospector mission, which told us how much hydrogen, and thus water, is likely on the Moon.

The gamma-ray spectrometer used on the Odyssey spacecraft consists of four main components: the gamma sensor head, the neutron spectrometer, the high energy neutron detector, and the central electronics assembly. The sensor head is separated from the rest of the spacecraft by a 6.2 meter (20 ft) boom, which was extended after Odyssey entered the mapping orbit at Mars. This maneuver is done to minimize interference from any gamma rays coming from the spacecraft itself. The initial spectrometer activity, lasting between 15 and 40 days, performed an instrument calibration before the boom was deployed. After about 100 days of the mapping mission, the boom was deployed and remained in this position for the duration of the mission. The two neutron detectors-the neutron spectrometer and the high-energy neutron detector-are mounted on the main spacecraft structure and operated continuously throughout the mapping mission.

=== GRS specifications for the Mars Odyssey mission ===
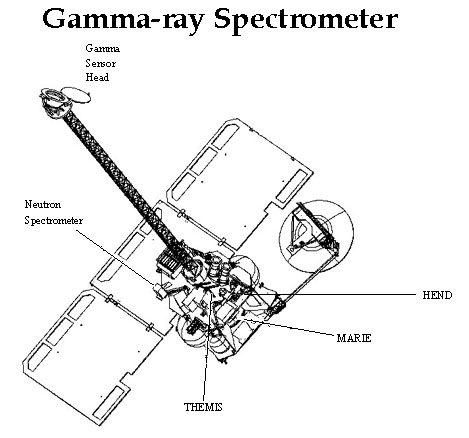

The Gamma-Ray Spectrometer weighs 30.5 kilograms (67.2 lb) and uses 32 watts of power. Along with its cooler, it measures 468 by 534 by 604 mm (18.4 by 21.0 by 23.8 in). The detector is a photodiode made of a 1.2 kg germanium crystal, reverse biased to about 3 kilovolts, mounted at the end of a six-meter boom to minimize interferences from the gamma radiation produced by the spacecraft itself. Its spatial resolution is about 300 km.

The neutron spectrometer is 173 by 144 by 314 mm (6.8 by 5.7 by 12.4 in).

The high-energy neutron detector measures 303 by 248 by 242 mm (11.9 by 9.8 by 9.5 in). The instrument's central electronics box is 281 by 243 by 234 mm (11.1 by 9.6 by 9.2 in).

== See also ==
- Total absorption spectroscopy
- Pandemonium effect
