= Visible Light Photon Counter =

Type of solid-state photodetector

A Visible Light Photon Counter (VLPC) is a photon counting photodetector based on impurity-band conduction in arsenic-doped silicon. They have high quantum efficiency and are able to detect single photons in the visible range of the electromagnetic spectrum. The ability to count the exact number of photons detected is extremely important for quantum key distribution.

Rockwell International's Science Center had previously announced the "Solid-State Photomultiplier" (SSPM), a wide-band (0.4–28 μm) detector. In the late 1980s a collaboration – initially consisting of Rockwell and UCLA – began developing scintillating-fiber particle trackers for use at the Superconducting Super Collider, based on a dedicated variant of the SSPM that came to be known as the Visible Light Photon Counter.

The operating principles are similar to APDs but based on impurity-band conduction. The devices are made from arsenic-doped silicon and have an impurity band 50 meV below the conduction band, resulting in a gain of 40000 to 80000 at a reverse bias of only a few volts (e.g. 7 V). (Note: In contrast, SPADs require a high reverse bias voltage and consequent quenching of the output current.) The narrow bandgap reduces gain dispersion, resulting in a uniform response to each photon, and hence the output pulse height is proportional to the number of incident photons. VLPCs must operate at cryogenic temperatures (6–10 K). They have a quantum efficiency of 85% at 565 nm and a temporal resolution of several nanoseconds.

VLPCs have been used extensively in the central tracking detector of the D0 experiment, and for muon beam-cooling studies for a muon collider (MICE). They have also been evaluated for quantum information science.
