= Canadian Penning Trap Mass Spectrometer =

American spectrometer

The Canadian Penning Trap Mass Spectrometer (CPT) is one of the major pieces of experimental equipment that is installed on the ATLAS superconducting heavy-ion linac facility at the Physics Division of the Argonne National Laboratory. It was developed and operated by physicist Guy Savard and a collaboration of other scientists at Argonne, the University of Manitoba, McGill University, Texas A&M University and the State University of New York.

== Development ==
The CPT was originally built for the Tandem Accelerator Superconducting Cyclotron (TASCC) facility at Chalk River Laboratories in Chalk River, Ontario, Canada. However, it was transferred to Argonne National Laboratory when the TASCC accelerator was decommissioned in 1998 due to funding issues.

The CPT spectrometer is designed to provide high-precision mass measurements of short-lived isotopes using radio-frequency (RF) fields. Accurate mass measurements of particular isotopes such as selenium-68 are important in the understanding of the detailed reaction mechanisms involved in the rapid-proton capture process, which occurs in astrophysical events like supernovae explosions and X-ray bursts. An X-ray burst is one possible site for the rp-process mechanism which involves the accretion of hydrogen and helium from one star onto the surface of its neutron star binary companion. Mass measurements are required as key inputs to network calculations used to describe this process in terms of the abundances of the nuclides produced, the light-curve profile of the X-ray bursts, and the energy produced. In the current configuration, more than 100 radioactive isotopes have been measured with half-lives much less than a second and with a precision (Δm/m) approaching 10^{−9}.

Recently, a novel injection system, the RF gas cooler, has been installed on the CPT to allow fast reaction products to be decelerated, thermalized and bunched for rapid and efficient injection. This enhances the investigative capabilities of the CPT on isotopes around the N=Z line with particular emphasis on isotopes of interest to low-energy tests of the electroweak interaction and the rp-process.

== See also ==
- Gammasphere
- Helical Orbit Spectrometer (HELIOS)
- Mass Spectrometry
- Penning Trap
- RFQ Beam Coolers
