= Anadi Canepa =

Italian experimental particle physicist

- Citizenship: Italian
- Education: University of Padova (Laurea, 2000); Purdue University (Ph.D., 2006)
- Known for: Electroweak symmetry breaking Higgs boson research Supersymmetric particles search
- Awards: APS Fellow (2025)
- Scientific career
- Fields: Particle physics
- Workplaces: Fermilab; TRIUMF

Anadi Canepa is an Italian experimental particle physicist and the current spokesperson for the CMS collaboration at Fermilab. She was elected as a Fellow by the Division of Particles and Fields Fellowship of the American Physical Society. Her research in particle physics primarily focuses on electroweak symmetry breaking and the search for new phenomena.

== Early life and education ==
Born in Italy, Canepa completed her Laurea in 2000 at the University of Padova. She directly followed her Laurea with a Ph.D. in Particle Physics at Purdue University in 2006. She began her research at Purdue with the CDF (2000-2011) collaboration.

== Career ==
Canepa's research at the CDF collaboration provided improvements to the silicon trigger system and tracker in the discovery of new phenomena and the Higgs Boson at the Tevatron particle accelerator. In 2008, she joined the ATLAS collaboration as a research scientist at TRIUMF, a Canadian particle physics laboratory.

She joined Fermilab as a scientist in 2015 and has since held several leadership positions in the CMS collaboration. CMS is one of the two general detectors of the Large Hadron Collider located at CERN, which the collaboration leads at Fermilab. She served as the head of the Fermilab CMS department for six years, simultaneously serving as secretary of the Fermilab Physics Advisory Committee and director of User Facilities.

At CMS, now known as the Collider Division within the Particle Physics Directorate, Canepa was appointed as the collaboration's spokesperson in 2026. She continues her role as a senior scientist while leading the collaboration. She is also a chair in the Division of Particles and Fields of the Canadian Association of Physics, and the North American representative for the 2026 European Strategy for Particle Physics.

Canepa was a 2025 award recipient of the American Physical Society Division of Particles and Fields Fellowship for her search for supersymmetric particles.

== Research ==
Anadi Canepa's research focuses on discovering new experimental particle phenomena and electroweak symmetry breaking and Higgs physics. Canepa will lead CMS in increasing particle collision rates with the High-Luminosity LHC, helping the collaboration in their pursuit of a deeper understanding of fundamentals. Her research in advanced tracking and trigger systems has contributed to particle accelerator research, along with her scientific publications.

== Selected publications ==
- A. Canepa, Searches for supersymmetry at the Large Hadron Collider, Reviews in Physics 4 100033 (2019).
- A. Canepa, T. Han, X. Wang, The search for electroweakinos, Annual Review of Nuclear and Particle Science 70: 425-54 (2020).
