= Muzaffer Atac =

Turkish-American physicist (1933–2010)

- Born: Muzaffer Atac; 24 August 1933; Kemaliye, Turkey
- Died: 7 December 2010 (aged 77); Wheaton, Illinois, USA
- Education: Ankara University, University of Illinois
- Known for: Contributions to instrumentation for physics, particularly his work with VLPCs and other detectors
- Scientific career
- Fields: Physics
- Workplaces: Fermilab; UCLA
- Doctoral advisor: Hans Frauenfelder

Muzaffer Atac (Ataç, 24 August 1933 – 7 December 2010) was a Turkish-American physicist who was one of the founding scientists of Fermilab and performed important work with visible light photon counters and other detectors for particle physics.

== Early life and career ==
Muzaffer Atac was born on August 24, 1933, in Kemaliye, a rural town in Turkey. He attended high school in Ankara, Turkey and received his BS in physics from Ankara University in 1957. Atac married his wife, Ayfer Temiztaş, on March 21, 1958. They had three children.

From 1959 to 1961, Atac was employed by the Minerals Searching and Investigating Institute in Ankara. In January 1961, Atac moved to the United States to study physics at the University of Illinois with the support of a NATO fellowship. He received his MS in physics from this institution in 1963. Atac completed his PhD thesis "Time Reversal Violation in Electromagnetic Interactions" under the supervision of Hans Frauenfelder at the University of Illinois. He returned to Ankara University for eight months as part of his PhD work and received his PhD degree from Ankara University.

== Fermilab and later career ==
On September 3, 1968, Atac began working for the United States Department of Energy's National Accelerator Laboratory, which would later become Fermilab. Atac moved to Wheaton, Illinois, in January 1971, where he would remain for the rest of his life.

While at Fermilab, Atac performed groundbreaking work with gas calorimeters, wire drift chambers, and high sensitivity solid state photon detectors, and he received several patents for his work. He later became interested in applications of particle detectors in the medical field and did work in medical imaging and the early detection of breast cancer. His work in this area produced several patented biomedical imaging devices. Atac served as head of Fermilab’s detector development group from 1972 until 1978, when he joined the Collider Detector at Fermilab (CDF) experiment. He was one of the first three scientists involved in this experiment, and he remained with CDF until 1997. Beginning in 1988, he worked on the development of solid state photomultipliers and visible light photon counters with Rockwell International. In 1989, he became an adjunct professor of physics at the University of California, Los Angeles, and he became an adjunct professor at the University of Texas at Dallas in 1990. He began working on cancer research at the University of California, Irvine in 1996. Beginning in 1995, Atac worked on developing a Silicon Pixels Vertex Tracking System for the Compact Muon Solenoid (CMS) experiment at CERN's Large Hadron Collider. Atac was author or co-author on over 500 publications.

Atac retired from Fermilab in June 2008 and died in his home on December 7, 2010.
