= Argonne Tandem Linear Accelerator System =

Argonne Tandem Linear Accelerator System (ATLAS)
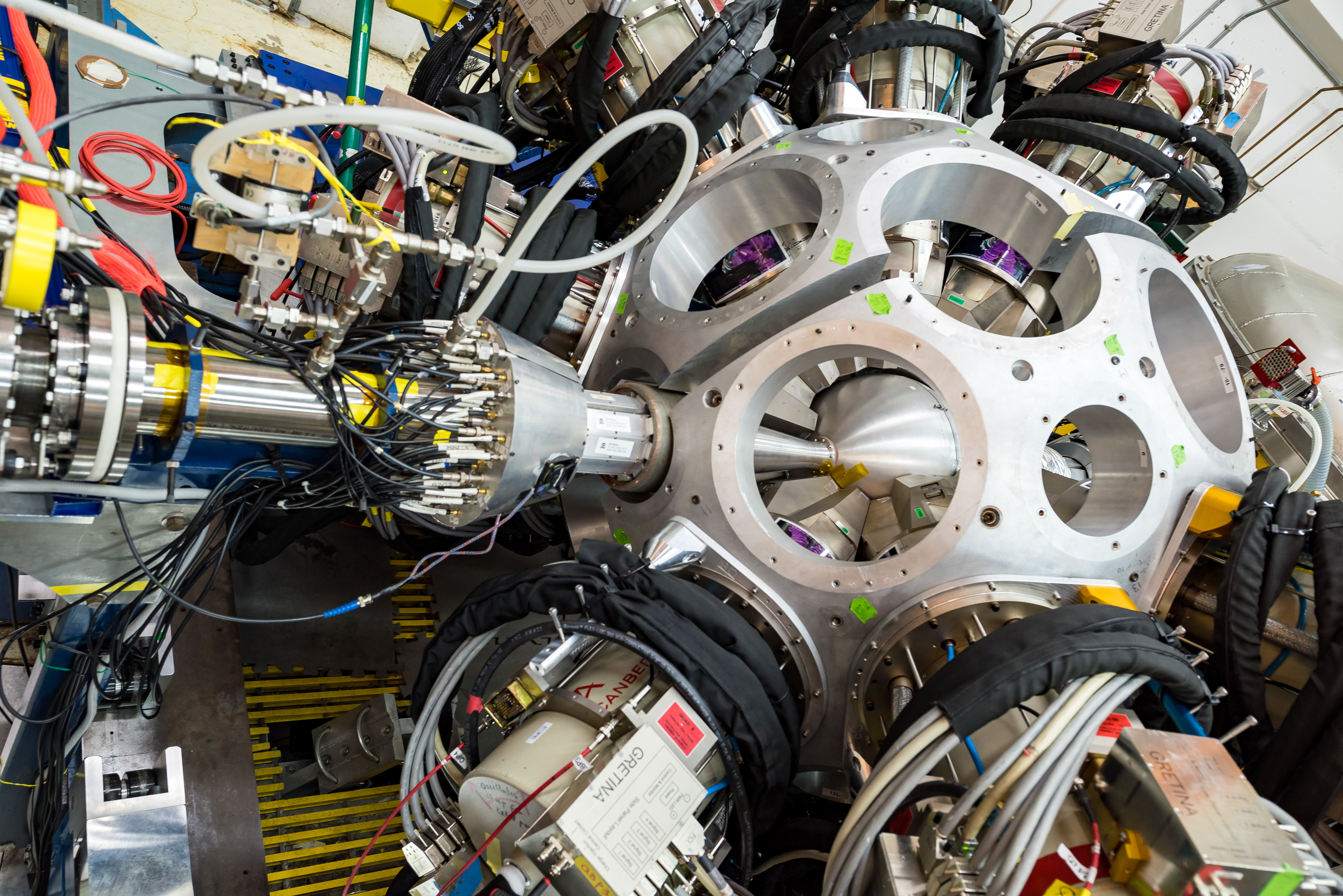
- The GRETINA Gamma Ray Detector mounted on the ATLAS beamline

General properties
- Accelerator type: Linear accelerator
- Beam type: heavy ions
- Target type: Fixed target

Beam properties
- Maximum energy: 17 MeV per nucleon
- Maximum current: 10 particle µA

Physical properties
- Location: Lemont, IL
- Coordinates: 41.716645°N 87.98440°W
- Institution: University of Chicago, United States Department of Energy
- Dates of operation: 1978 - present

The Argonne Tandem Linac Accelerator System (ATLAS) is a U.S. Department of Energy scientific user facility at Argonne National Laboratory. ATLAS is the first superconducting linear accelerator (linac) for heavy ions at energies in the vicinity of the Coulomb barrier and is open to scientists from all over the world.

== Properties ==
Stable ion beams at ATLAS are generated from one of two sources: the 9-MV electrostatic tandem Van de Graaff accelerator or the Positive Ion Injector, a 12-MV low-velocity linac and electron cyclotron resonance (ECR) ion source. The ions are sent from one of these two into the 20-MV 'booster' linac, then to the 20-MV 'ATLAS' linac section.

The ATLAS linac is constructed with seven different superconducting resonator designs, each one creating an electromagnetic wave of a different velocity. The ions in the ATLAS linac are aligned into a beam which exits the linac into one of three experimental areas. The experiment areas contain scattering chambers, spectrometers and spectrographs, beamlines, a gamma-ray facility, and particle detectors.

In 2009, Argonne added a system called CARIBU (Californium Rare Ion Breeder Upgrade) to ATLAS. The system is capable of generating beams of rare isotopes, which can then be sent to the accelerator sections.

ATLAS has since received additional upgrades with two enhancements: The Electron Beam Ion System (EBIS), which enables radioactive beams to match the accelerating structures by increasing the ion beam’s positive charge, and the Argonne In-Flight Radioactive Ion Separator (RAISOR), which helps to improve beam purity by separating out specific isotopes. The enhancements of ATLAS with EBIS and RAISOR help scientists probe the structures of exotic elements, study the nature of the nuclear forces, and better understand the production of elements in stars and supernovae.

Niobium is the primary metal used to construct the tubes in the individual in-line resonators. Niobium is used because it is relatively cheap, yet it is a superconductor at relatively high temperatures. Niobium has poor malleability, which makes it difficult to construct the shapes needed for the resonators. The machinists working at ATLAS are some of the only people in the world able to work with niobium to the degree necessary for construction and repair of the ATLAS parts.

== Research ==
The energy levels of the ions produced by ATLAS are ideal to study the properties of the nucleus. Specifically, scientists use ATLAS to understand reactions between nuclei from very low energies (typically encountered in burning stars) to the very highest energies (encountered soon after the Big Bang). Nuclei with specific properties can be studied to understand fundamental interactions.

== Target areas ==
- Atom Trap at ATLAS
- Canadian Penning Trap Mass Spectrometer
- Enge Split Pole Spectrograph
- Fragment Mass Analyzer
- Gammasphere
- Helical Orbit Spectrometer (HELIOS)
- Large Scattering Chamber

== See also ==
- Tandem Accelerator Superconducting Cyclotron (TASCC)
