= Project X (accelerator) =

Project-X was a proposed high-intensity proton accelerator complex which is to be built at the Fermi National Accelerator Laboratory. It was planned to produce beams of different energies up to 8 GeV for precision experiments involving kaons and muons. The complex can also be used to create a high-intensity neutrino beam for neutrino oscillation experiments such as NOνA and the Long Baseline Neutrino Experiment. Project-X was to be based on superconducting RF components such as those developed for the International Linear Collider.

Immediate plans are for cost-effective upgrades in proton luminosity referred to as the Proton Improvement Plan-II. More future-thinking proposals see Project X as laying the groundwork for a possible Muon collider at the Fermilab site. The linear accelerator will be 700 meters long - the length of seven football fields - and would be constructed in the center of the Tevatron ring. It is expected to generate an intense beam of protons that can feed into an existing accelerator ring and then into the Main Injector. At present Project-X was deprioritized in favour of a dedicated push towards long baseline neutrino oscillations with the deep underground neutrino experiment (DUNE).

== Background ==
Project X is a long range plan to bring accelerators at Fermilab campus to new frontiers. The plan for accelerators focuses on two of the three frontiers that are long-term plans of Fermilab. In the intensity frontier, the new high-intensity accelerators will support experiments that require intense particle beams to understand particles such as neutrinos, muons, kaons, and nuclei. In the energy frontier, the accelerators will support the detection of new particles and forces with potential future projects such as a multi-TeV Muon Collider.

== Stages ==
The immediate plan of Project X is to focus on the intensity frontier. The project is broken down into 3 stages. Stage one includes upgrades to existing facilities to support immediate experiments. This stage has translated into work done in the Proton Improvement Plan. Stage two includes delivery of three concurrent beam levels: 2.9 MW at 3 GeV; 50–200 kW at 8 GeV and 2.3 MW at 60–120 GeV. Stage three is to build next generation accelerators as the front end to the energy frontier based on international collaboration in projects such as the Neutrino Factory and Muon Collider.
