= Ionization cooling =

In accelerator physics, ionization cooling is a physical process for reducing the beam emittance of a charged particle beam ("cooling") by passing the particles through some material, reducing their momentum as they ionize atomic electrons in the material. Thus, the normalised beam emittance is reduced. By re-accelerating the beam, for example in an RF cavity, the longitudinal momentum may be restored without replacing transverse momentum. Thus, overall the angular spread and hence the geometric emittance in the beam will be reduced.

Ionization cooling can be spoiled by stochastic physical processes. Multiple Coulomb scattering of muons as well as nuclear scattering of protons and ions can reduce the cooling or even lead to net heating transverse to the direction of beam motion. In addition, energy straggling can cause heating parallel to the direction of beam motion.

== Muon cooling ==
The primary use of ionization cooling is envisaged to be for cooling of muon beams. This is because ionization cooling is the only technique that works on the timescale of the muon lifetime. Ionization cooling channels have been designed for use in a neutrino factory and a muon collider. Muon ionization cooling has been demonstrated for the first time by the proof of principle International Muon Ionization Cooling Experiment (MICE). Other PoP muon ionization cooling experiments have been devised.

== Other particles ==
Ionization cooling has also been proposed for use in low energy ion beams and proton beams.

== Longitudinal cooling ==
The technique can be adapted to provide longitudinal as well as transverse cooling by using a dipole magnet as a dispersive prism to divide the particles by energy, and then passing the resultant "rainbow" beam though a tapered wedge of cooling material. Thus, faster particles are cooled more and slower particles are cooled less. A simple way is to fill the dipole itself with cooling material, so that more energetic particles following a larger orbit pass are cooled more.

== See also ==
- Particle beam cooling
