= Electron cooling =

Aspect of charged particle beams

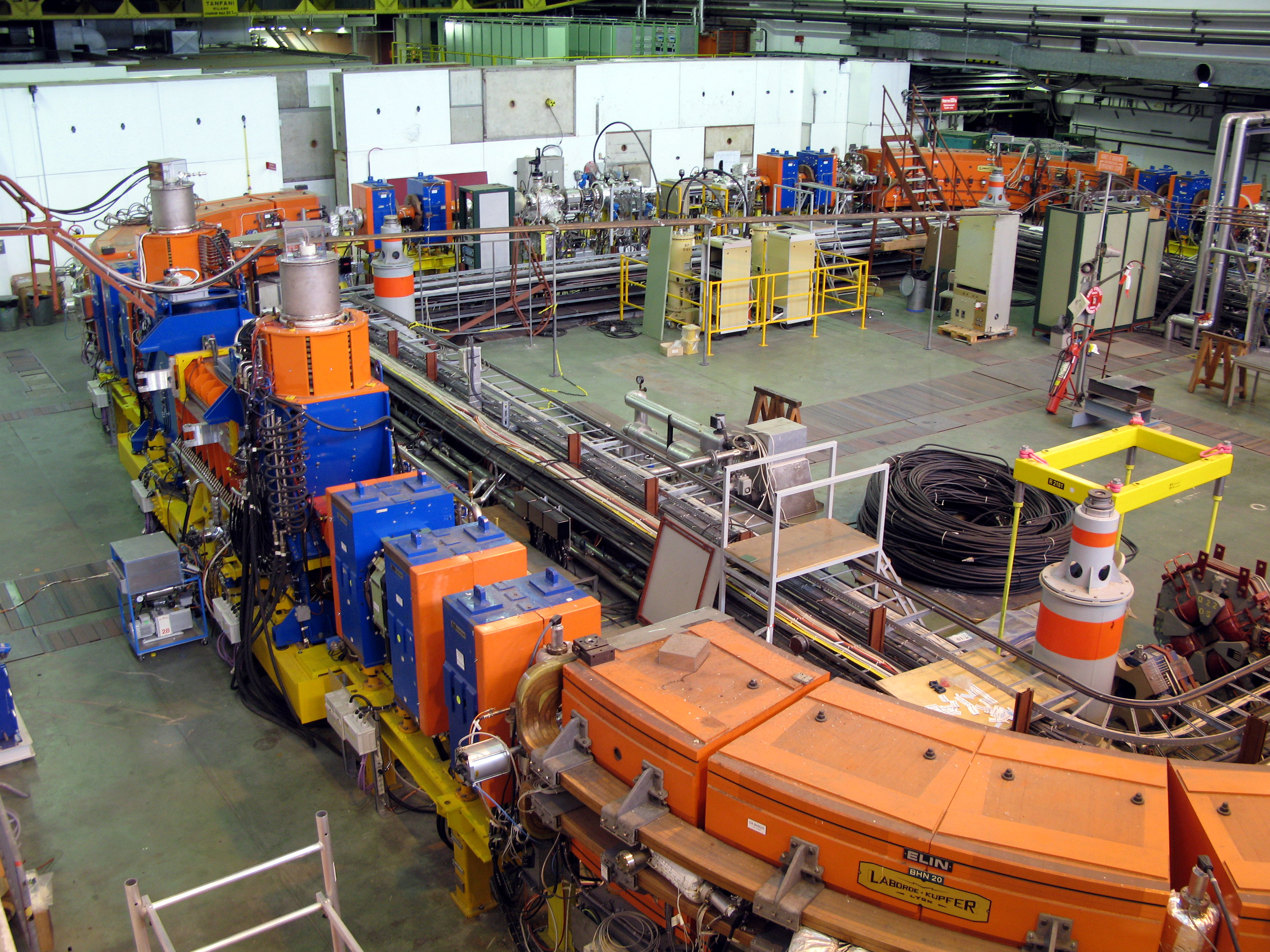
Electron cooler (left) at LEIR/CERN. The electron source and dump are installed in the upper metallic cylinders.

Electron cooling (Russian: электронное охлаждение) is a method to shrink the emittance (size, divergence, and energy spread) of a charged particle beam without removing particles from the beam. Since the number of particles remains unchanged and the space coordinates and their derivatives (angles) are reduced, this means that the phase space occupied by the stored particles is compressed. It is equivalent to reducing the temperature of the beam. See also stochastic cooling.

The method was invented by Gersh Budker at INP, Novosibirsk, in 1966 for the purpose of increasing luminosity of hadron colliders. It was first tested in 1974 with 68 MeV protons at NAP-M storage ring at INP.

It is used at both operating ion colliders: the Relativistic Heavy Ion Collider and in the Low Energy Ion Ring at CERN. CERN also has two electron coolers in its Antimatter Factory complex, for cooling of antiprotons - one in the larger Antimatter Decelerator ring, and one in the smaller ELENA ring.

Basically, electron cooling works as follows:

- A beam of dense quasi-monoenergetic electrons is produced and merged with the ion beam to be cooled.
- The velocity of the electrons is made equal to the average velocity of the ions.
- The ions undergo Coulomb scattering in the electron “gas” and exchange momentum with the electrons. Thermodynamic equilibrium is reached when the particles have the same momentum, which requires that the much lighter electrons have much higher velocities. Thus, thermal energy is transferred from the ions to the electrons.
- The electron beam is finally bent away from the ion beam.

== See also ==
- Stochastic cooling
- Particle beam cooling
