= Absorber =

In high energy physics experiments, an absorber is a block of material used to absorb some of the energy of an incident particle in an experiment. Absorbers can be made of a variety of materials, depending on the purpose; lead, tungsten and liquid hydrogen are common choices. Most absorbers are used as part of a particle detector; particle accelerators use absorbers to reduce the radiation damage on accelerator components.

== Other uses of the same word ==
- Absorbers are used in ionization cooling, as in the International Muon Ionization Cooling Experiment.
- In solar power, a high degree of efficiency is achieved by using black absorbers which reflect off much less of the incoming energy.
- In sunscreen formulations, ingredients which absorb UVA/UVB rays, such as avobenzone and octyl methoxycinnamate, are known as absorbers. They are contrasted with physical "blockers" of UV radiation such as titanium dioxide and zinc oxide.
