= Particle beam cooling =

Techniques to control particle beam properties

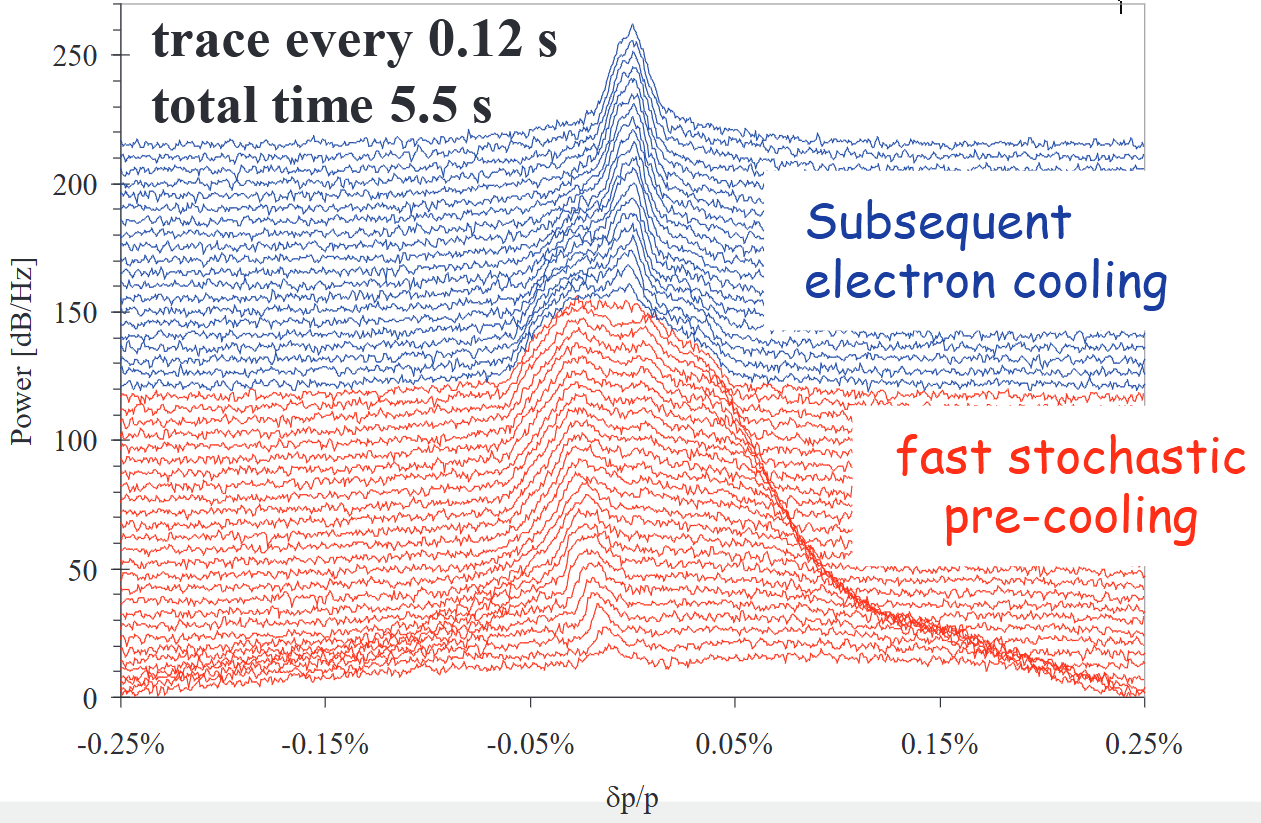
Momentum spread dynamics during consecutive stochastic and electron cooling at ESR storage ring, GSI.

Particle beam cooling is the process of improving the quality of particle beams produced by particle accelerators, by reducing the emittance. Techniques for particle beam cooling include:

- Stochastic cooling
- Electron cooling
- Ionization cooling
- Laser cooling
- Radiation damping
- Buffer-gas cooling within RF quadrupoles
