= Nigel J. T. Smith =

British-Canadian Physicist

Nigel Smith is a British-Canadian astroparticle physicist and the Executive Director and CEO at TRIUMF.

== Education ==
Nigel Smith obtained both his undergraduate and graduate degree in physics and astrophysics from the University of Leeds in the United Kingdom. He studied cosmic and gamma rays for his PhD and undertook experimental research in Antarctica where he was the sole operator of the South Pole Air Shower Experiment (SPASE) at the South Pole. In 1998, he became the first Briton to ‘winter-over’ at the South Pole, where he was the sole operator of a detector array used in a study of very high energy cosmic rays.

== Career ==
Smith was appointed the Executive Director and CEO of TRIUMF in 2021. He leads TRIUMF and manages government and international relations, strategic growth of the research programme and facility infrastructure, and the development of the team and internal processes.

Prior to working at TRIUMF, between 2009 and 2021 Smith was the Executive Director at SNOLAB, developing the capabilities of Canada’s deep underground research facility. SNOLAB is 2070m underground in the Vale Creighton mine near Sudbury, Ontario, and hosts searches for dark matter and studies of neutrino properties.

Throughout his career, Smith has worked in extreme environments to pursue his research. He has led multiple teams at facilities internationally and international research collaborations. At the STFC Rutherford Appleton Laboratory, he led the international collaboration that pioneered the use of liquid xenon for dark matter studies through the construction of the ZEPLIN-I and ZEPLIN-II projects. In 1989, he was one of the first to enter a new U.K. deep underground laboratory at the Boulby Mine, on the Cleveland/North Yorkshire border, where he searched for WIMPs 1100m underground.

== Awards and honours ==
In 2010, Smith is chartered physicist in both Canada and the U.K. a member of the Canadian Association of Physics, the Institute of Physicists, and a fellow at the Royal Astronomical Society. He was awarded the U.S Congressional medal and winter-over bar for his Antarctic duties in 1988. He was elected a Fellow of the Royal Society in 2025.

== Publications ==
- Alner, G., Araújo, H., Bewick, A., Bungau, C., Camanzi, B., Carson, M., Cashmore, R., Chagani, H., Chepel, V., Cline, D., Davidge, D., Davies, J., Daw, E., Dawson, J., Durkin, T., Edwards, B., Gamble, T., Gao, J., Ghag, C., . . . Wolfs, F. (2007). "First limits on WIMP nuclear recoil signals in ZEPLIN-II: A two-phase xenon detector for dark matter detection". Astroparticle Physics, 28(3), 287–302. https://doi.org/10.1016/j.astropartphys.2007.06.002
- Smith, N., Murphy, A., & Sumner, T. (2006). Reply to: “Critical revision of the ZEPLIN-I sensitivity to WIMP interactions.” Physics Letters B, 642(5–6), 567–569. https://doi.org/10.1016/j.physletb.2006.09.039
- Lebedenko, V. N., Araújo, H. M., Barnes, E. J., Bewick, A., Cashmore, R., Chepel, V., Currie, A., Davidge, D., Dawson, J., Durkin, T., Edwards, B., Ghag, C., Horn, M., Howard, A. S., Hughes, A. J., Jones, W. G., Joshi, M., Kalmus, G. E., Kovalenko, A. G., . . . Walker, R. J. (2009). "Results from the first science run of the ZEPLIN-III dark matter search experiment". Physical Review D, 80(5). https://doi.org/10.1103/physrevd.80.052010
- Abbott, B., Abbott, R., Abbott, T., Abernathy, M., Acernese, F., Ackley, K., Adams, C., Adams, T., Addesso, P., Adhikari, R., Adya, V., Affeldt, C., Agathos, M., Agatsuma, K., Aggarwal, N., Aguiar, O., Aiello, L., Ain, A., Ajith, P., . . . Zweizig, J. (2016). "Observation of Gravitational Waves from a Binary Black Hole Merger". Physical Review Letters, 116(6). https://doi.org/10.1103/physrevlett.116.061102
