= Racing Boy =

Motorcycle part and accessory brand

Racing-Boy
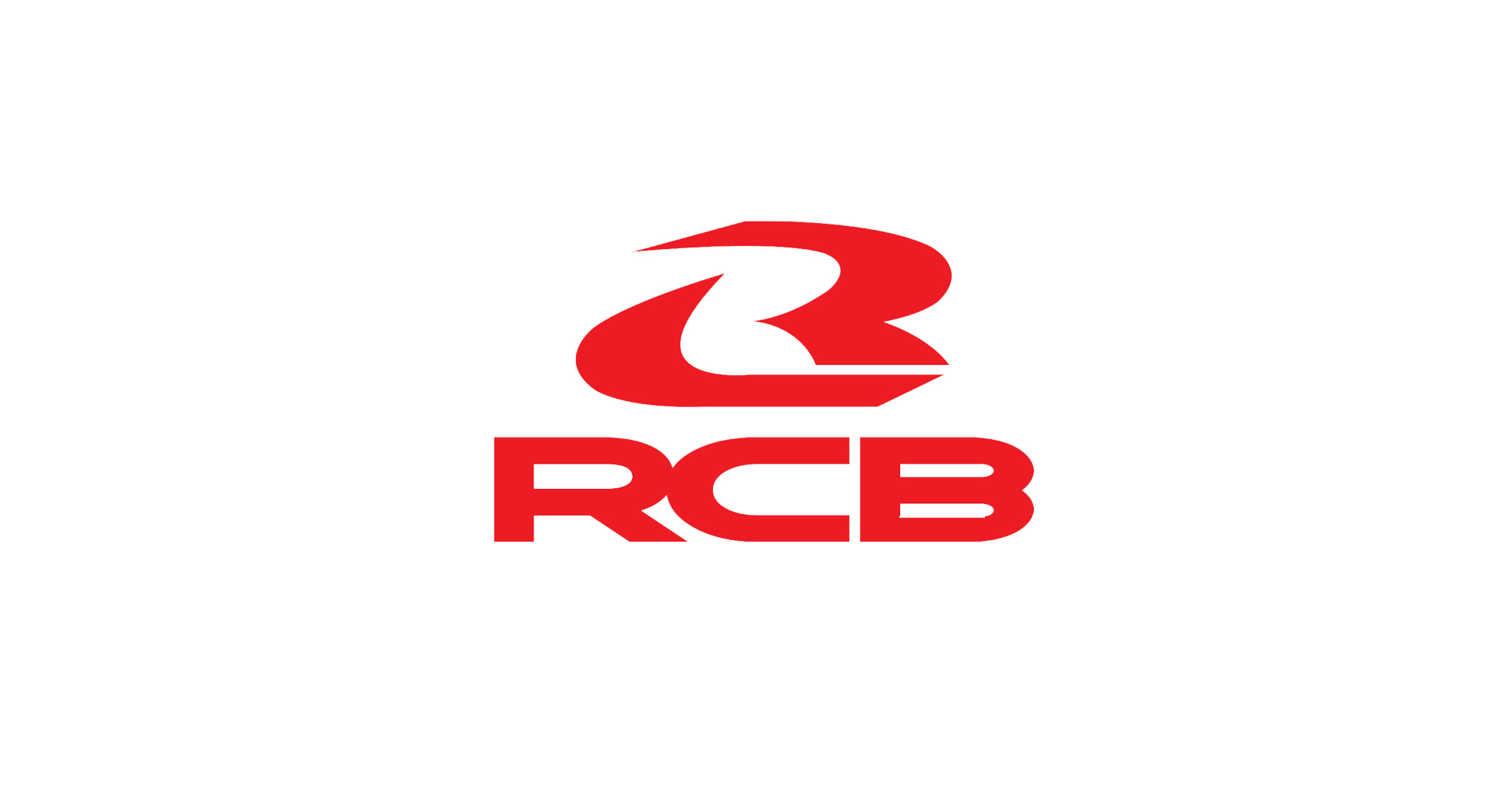
- RCB Corporate logo
- Type: Private Limited Company
- Industry: Motorcycle aftermarket
- Founded: Bukit Mertajam, Penang, MY (1995)
- Founder: Lee Meng Tek
- Headquarters: Puchong, Selangor, Malaysia
- Area served: Malaysia, Thailand, Vietnam, Philippines, Singapore, Greece, Indonesia, Cambodia and Bermuda
- Key people: Lee Meng Tek, Sam Lee, Mien Hok Gie (Director) and Sam Hok Gie (CEO)
- Products: Motorcycle Parts
- Number of employees: 109
- Website: https://rcb.com/

Racing Boy is a brand that manufactures motorcycle aftermarket parts and accessories. The brand started in Malaysia since 1995. Thousands of products have been produced: including rims, absorber, braking system, engine parts, handling system, etc. Racing Boy renamed and re-branded in 2014 to RCB.

== History ==
Racing Boy was established in 1995 by Mr. Lee Meng Tek from Bukit Mertajam, Pulau Pinang. Initially, this brand was registered under Asian Alloy Enterprise. Later in 1998, Mr. Lee expanded his business by moving to Selangor state, city of Malaysia. To rebrand, Racing Boy has been re-registered and incorporated under a new company named Meng Kah Auto Parts Trading Sdn Bhd (MKA). Since then, the Racing Boy brand operates its business in Puchong Utama Industrial Area.

== Dealerships and distributors ==
With thousands of local authorized dealers in Malaysia, Racing Boy also has main distributors in overseas: including Singapore, Philippines, Cambodia, Vietnam, Thailand, Indonesia, Bermuda and Greece.
