= RFQ beam cooler =

A radio-frequency quadrupole (RFQ) beam cooler is a device for particle beam cooling, especially suited for ion beams. It lowers the temperature of a particle beam by reducing its energy dispersion and emittance, effectively increasing its brightness (brilliance). The prevalent mechanism for cooling in this case is buffer-gas cooling, whereby the beam loses energy from collisions with a light, neutral and inert gas (typically helium). The cooling must take place within a confining field in order to counteract the thermal diffusion that results from the ion-atom collisions.

The quadrupole mass analyzer (a radio frequency quadrupole used as a mass filter) was invented by Wolfgang Paul in the late 1950s to early 60s at the University of Bonn, Germany. Paul shared the 1989 Nobel Prize in Physics for his work. Samples for mass analysis are ionized, for example by laser (matrix-assisted laser desorption/ionization) or discharge (electrospray or inductively coupled plasma) and the resulting beam is sent through the RFQ and "filtered" by scanning the operating parameters (chiefly the RF amplitude). This gives a mass spectrum, or fingerprint, of the sample. Residual gas analyzers use this principle as well.

== Applications of ion cooling to nuclear physics ==
Despite its long history, high-sensitivity high-accuracy mass measurements of atomic nuclei continue to be very important areas of research for many branches of physics. Not only do these measurements provide a better understanding of nuclear structures and nuclear forces but they also offer insight into how matter behaves in some of nature's harshest environments. At facilities such as ISOLDE at CERN and TRIUMF in Vancouver, for instance, measurement techniques are now being extended to short-lived radionuclei that only occur naturally in the interior of exploding stars. Their short half-lives and very low production rates at even the most powerful facilities require the very highest in sensitivity of such measurements.

Penning traps, the central element in modern high-accuracy high-sensitivity mass measurement installations, enable measurements of accuracies approaching 1 part in 10^{11} on single ions. However, to achieve this Penning traps must have the ion to be measured delivered to it very precisely and with certainty that it is indeed the desired ion. This imposes severe requirements on the apparatus that must take the atomic nucleus out of the target in which it has been created, sort it from the myriad of other ions that are emitted from the target and then direct it so that it can be captured in the measurement trap.

Cooling these ion beams, particularly radioactive ion beams, has been shown to drastically improve the accuracy and sensitivity of mass measurements by reducing the phase space of the ion collections in question. Using a light neutral background gas, typically helium, charged particles originating from on-line mass separators undergo a number of soft collisions with the background gas molecules resulting in fractional losses of the ions' kinetic energy and a reduction of the ion ensemble's overall energy. In order for this to be effective, however, the ions need to be contained using transverse radiofrequency quadrupole (RFQ) electric fields during the collisional cooling process (also known as buffer gas cooling). These RFQ coolers operate on the same principles as quadrupole ion traps and have been shown to be particularly well suited for buffer gas cooling given their capacity for total confinement of ions having a large dispersion of velocities, corresponding to kinetic energies up to tens of electron volts. A number of the RFQ coolers have already been installed at research facilities around the world and a list of their characteristics can be found below.

== List of facilities containing RFQ coolers ==
Name	Facility	Input beam	Input emittance	Cooler length	R_{0}	RF voltage, freq, DC	Mass range	Axial voltage	Pressure	Output beam qualities	Images
Colette	CERN	60 keV ISOLDE beam decelerated to ≤ 10 eV	~ 30 π-mm-mrad	504 mm (15 segments, electrically isolated)	7 mm	Freq : 450–700 kHz	–	0.25 V/cm	0.01 mbar He	Reaccelerated to 59.99 keV; transverse emittance 8 π-mm-mrad at 20 keV	COLETTE1 COLETTE2
LPC Cooler	GANIL	SPIRAL type beams	Up to ~ 100 π-mm-mrad	468 mm (26 segments, electrically isolated)	15 mm	RF : up to 250 Vp, Freq : 500 kHz–2.2 MHz	–	–	up to 0.1 mbar	–	LPC1 LPC2
SHIPTRAP Cooler	GSI	SHIP type beams 20–500 keV/A	–	1140 mm (29 segments, electrically isolated)	3.9 mm	RF: 30–200 Vpp, Freq: 800 kHz – 1.2 MHz	up to 260 Da	Variable: 0.25–1 V/cm	~ 5×10-3 mbar He	–	SHIPTRAP1 SHIPTRAP2
JYFL Cooler	University of Jyvaskyla	IGISOL type beam at 40 keV	Up to 17 π-mm-mrad	400 mm (16 segments)	10 mm	RF: 200 Vp, Freq: 300 kHz–800 kHz	–	~1 V/cm	~0.1 mbar He	~3 π-mm-mrad, Energy spread < 4 eV	JYFL1 JYFL2 JYFL3
MAFF Cooler	FRM II	30 keV beam decelerated to ~100 eV	–	450 mm	30 mm	RF: 100–150 Vpp, Freq: 5 MHz	–	~0.5 V/cm	~0.1 mbar He	energy spread = 5 eV, Emittance @ 30keV: from = 36 π-mm-mrad to eT = 6 π-mm-mrad	–
ORNL Cooler	ORNL	20–60 keV negative RIBs decelerated to <100 eV	~50 π-mm-mrad (@ 20 keV)	400 mm	3.5 mm	RF: ~400 Vp, Freq: up to 2.7 MHz	--	up to ±5 kV on tapered rods	~0.01 mbar	Energy spread ~2 eV	ORNL1 ORNL2 ORNL3
LEBIT Cooler	FRIB	5 keV DC beams	–	–	–	–	–	–	~1×x10−1 mbar He (high-pressure section)	–	LEBIT1 LEBIT2 LEBIT3
ISCOOL	CERN	60 keV ISOLDE beam	up to 20 π-mm-mrad	800 mm (using segmented DC wedge electrodes)	20 mm	RF: up to 380 V, Freq: 300 kHz – 3 MHz	10–300 u	~0.1 V/cm	0.01–0.1 mbar He	–	ISCOOL1 ISCOOL2 ISCOOL3 ISCOOL4
ISOLTRAP Cooler	CERN	60 keV ISOLDE beam	–	860 mm (segmented)	6 mm	RF: ~125 Vp, Freq: ~1 MHz.	–	–	~2×10-2 mbar He	elong ≈ 10 eV us, etrans ≈ 10p mm mrad.	ISOLTRAP1 ISOLTRAP2
TITAN RFCT	TRIUMF	continuous 30–60 keV ISAC beam	–	–	–	RF: 1000 Vpp, Freq: 300 kHz – 3 MHz	–	–	–	6 π-mm-mrad at 5 keV extraction energy	TITAN1 TITAN2 TITAN3
TRIMP Cooler	University of Groningen	TRIMP beams	–	660 mm (segmented)	5 mm	RF= 100 Vp, Freq.: up to 1.5 MHz	6 < A < 250	--	up to 0.1 mbar	--	TRIMP1 TRIMP2 TRIMP3
SPIG Leuven cooler	KU Leuven	IGISOL Beams	–	124 mm (sextupole rod structure)	1.5 mm	RF= 0–150 Vpp, Freq.: 4.7 MHz	–	–	~50 kPa He	Mass Resolving Power (MRP)= 1450	SPIG1 SPIG2 SPIG3
Argonne CPT cooler	Argonne National Laboratory	–	–	–	–	–	–	–	–	–	CPT Cooler1 CPT Cooler2
SLOWRI cooler	RIKEN	–	–	600 mm (segmented sextuple rod structure)	8 mm	RF= 400 Vpp, Freq.: 3.6 MHz	–	–	~10 mbar He	–	–

== See also ==
- Quadrupole mass analyzer

== Bibliography ==
- F. Herfurth; J. Dilling; A. Kellerbauer; et al. (2001). "A linear radiofrequency ion trap for accumulation, bunching, and emittance improvement of radioactive ion beams". Nuclear Instruments and Methods A. 469 (2): 254–275. arXiv:nucl-ex/0011021. Bibcode:2001NIMPA.469..254H. doi:10.1016/S0168-9002(01)00168-1. S2CID 14155609.
- A. Kellerbauer; T. Kim; R. B. Moore; P. Varfalvy (2001). "Buffer gas cooling of ion beams". Nuclear Instruments and Methods A. 469 (2): 276–285. Bibcode:2001NIMPA.469..276K. CiteSeerX 10.1.1.619.6527. doi:10.1016/S0168-9002(01)00286-8.
- J. Schönfelder; D. Ackermann; H. Backe; et al. (2002). "SHIPTRAP—a capture and storage facility for heavy radionuclides at GSI". Nuclear Physics A. 701 (1–4): 579–582. Bibcode:2002NuPhA.701..579S. doi:10.1016/S0375-9474(01)01648-7.
- J. Szerypo; A. Jokinen; V. S. Kolhinen; et al. (2002). "Penning trap at IGISOL". Nuclear Physics A. 701 (1–4): 588–591. doi:10.1016/S0375-9474(01)01650-5. S2CID 120688040.
- S. Schwarz; G. Bollen; D. Lawton; et al. (2003). "A second-generation ion beam buncher and cooler". Nuclear Instruments and Methods B. 204: 474–477. Bibcode:2003NIMPB.204..474S. doi:10.1016/S0168-583X(02)02114-6.
- G. Sikler; D. Ackermann; F. Attallah; et al. (2003). "First on-line test of SHIPTRAP". Nuclear Instruments and Methods B. 204: 482–486. Bibcode:2003NIMPB.204..482S. doi:10.1016/S0168-583X(02)02116-X.
- J. Clark; R. C. Barber; C. Boudreau; et al. (2003). "Improvements in the injection system of the Canadian Penning trap mass spectrometer". Nuclear Instruments and Methods B. 204: 487–491. Bibcode:2003NIMPB.204..487C. doi:10.1016/S0168-583X(02)02117-1.
- D. Habs; M. Groß; W. Assmann; et al. (2003). "The Munich accelerator for fission fragments MAFF". Nuclear Instruments and Methods B. 204: 739–745. Bibcode:2003NIMPB.204..739H. doi:10.1016/S0168-583X(03)00496-8.
- T. Faestermann; W. Assmann; L. Beck; et al. (2004). "The Munich Accelerator for Fission Fragments – MAFF". Nuclear Physics A. 746: 22–26. Bibcode:2004NuPhA.746...22F. doi:10.1016/j.nuclphysa.2004.09.106.
- J. B. Neumayr; L. Beck; D. Habs; et al. (2006). "The ion-catcher device for SHIPTRAP". Nuclear Instruments and Methods B. 244 (2): 489. Bibcode:2006NIMPB.244..489N. doi:10.1016/j.nimb.2005.10.017.
