= Helical orbit spectrometer =

The helical orbit spectrometer (HELIOS) is a measurement device for studying nuclear reactions in inverse kinematics. It is installed at the ATLAS facility at Argonne National Laboratory.

== History ==
The HELIOS concept was first proposed at the Workshop on Experimental Equipment for an Advanced ISOL Facility at Lawrence Berkeley National Laboratory in 1998. The concept was introduced as a next-generation large-acceptance spectrometer for measuring heavy ion reactions.

== Concept ==
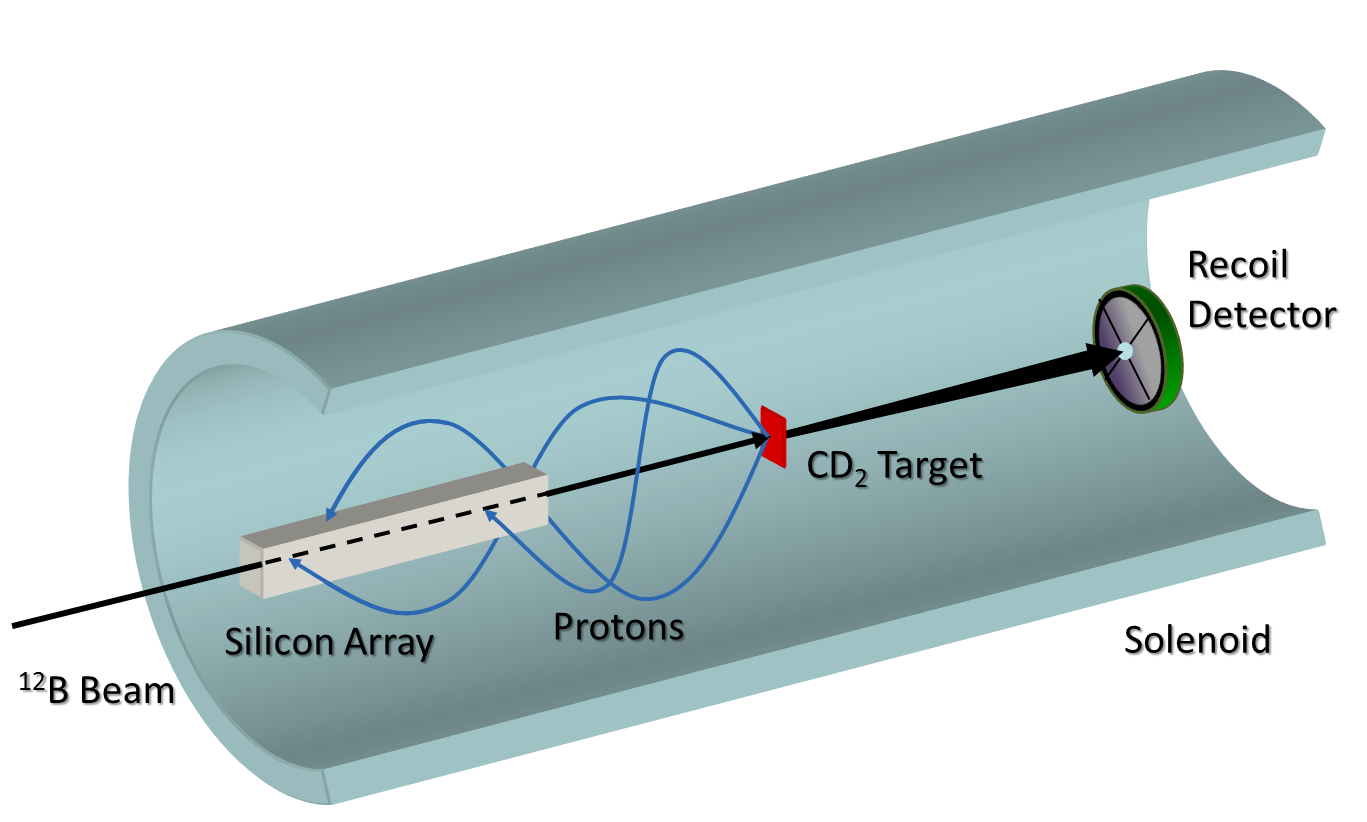
Schematic of the HELIOS spectrometer.

Schematically, HELIOS is based around a large-bore superconducting solenoid. Accelerated heavy-ion beams enter the solenoid along the magnetic axis, passing through a hollow detector array. The beam then intercepts a "light-ion" target, also on the magnetic axis. In the configuration shown in the figure, charged reaction products ejected rearward in the laboratory frame move in helical orbits to the detector array. Heavy beam-like recoils are kinematically focused forward in a narrow cone and intercepted by the so-called recoil detector array.

== Development ==
The HELIOS Collaboration was formed with members from Argonne National Laboratory, Western Michigan University, and Manchester University to construct, characterize, and commission the HELIOS spectrometer. The construction of the spectrometer began with the delivery of the superconducting solenoid upon which HELIOS is based. The solenoid was delivered to Argonne on December 8, 2006.

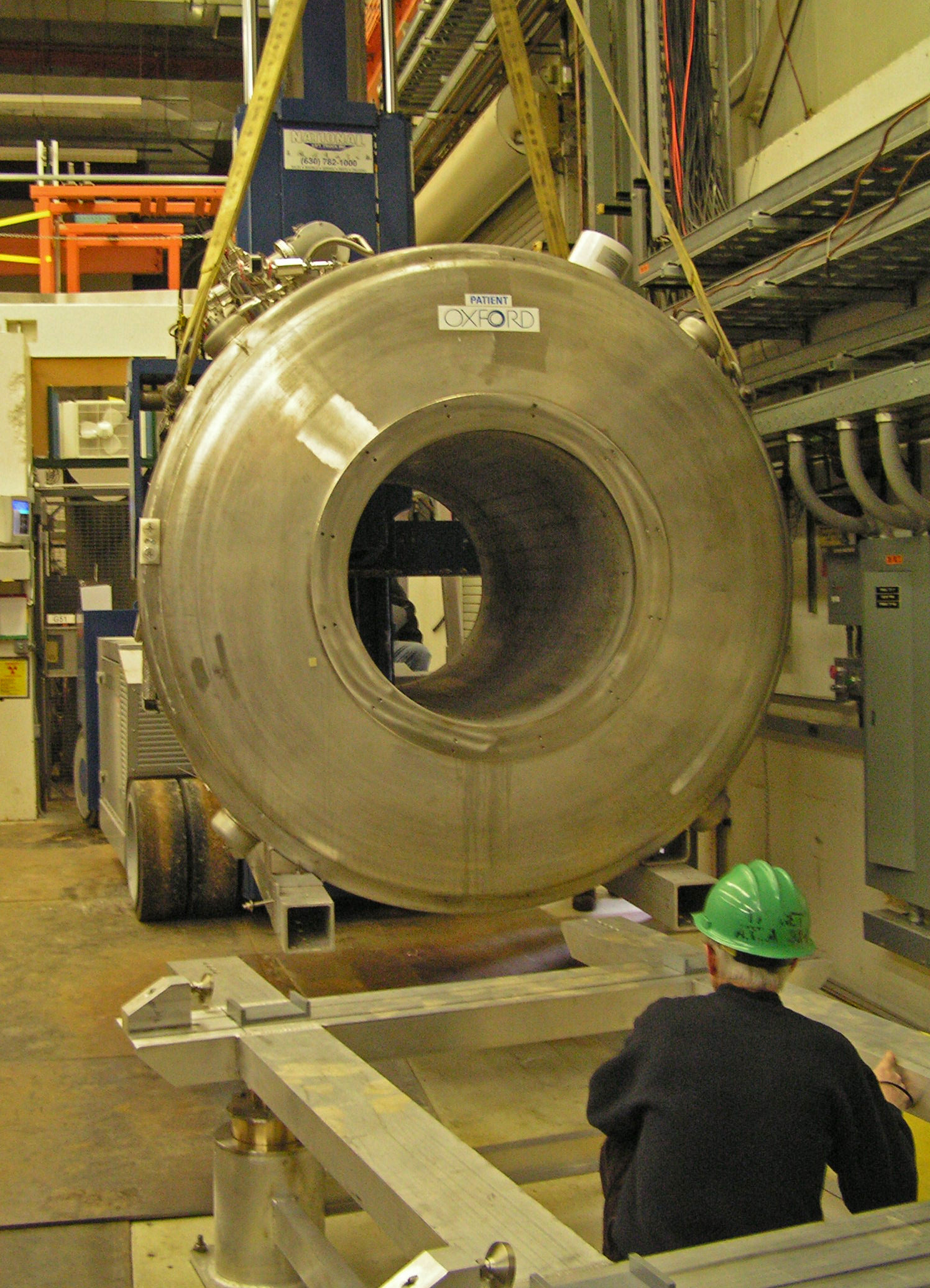
Installation of the HELIOS solenoid.

Over the next 20 months, the solenoid was transformed into a nuclear spectrometer and connected to the ATLAS beam line. The first stable beam was tuned to the HELIOS target area on Tuesday, August 12, 2008 at 13:29. This first commissioning measurement studied the well-known nuclear reaction ^{28}Si(d,p) in inverse kinematics in order characterize the performance of the spectrometer.

The radioactive ion beam commissioning of HELIOS took place in early March, 2009. This was the second measurement made with HELIOS and is considered the first actual "experiment" conducted using HELIOS.

== See also ==
- Canadian Penning Trap Mass Spectrometer
- Gammasphere
