= Gammasphere =

Gamma ray spectrometer

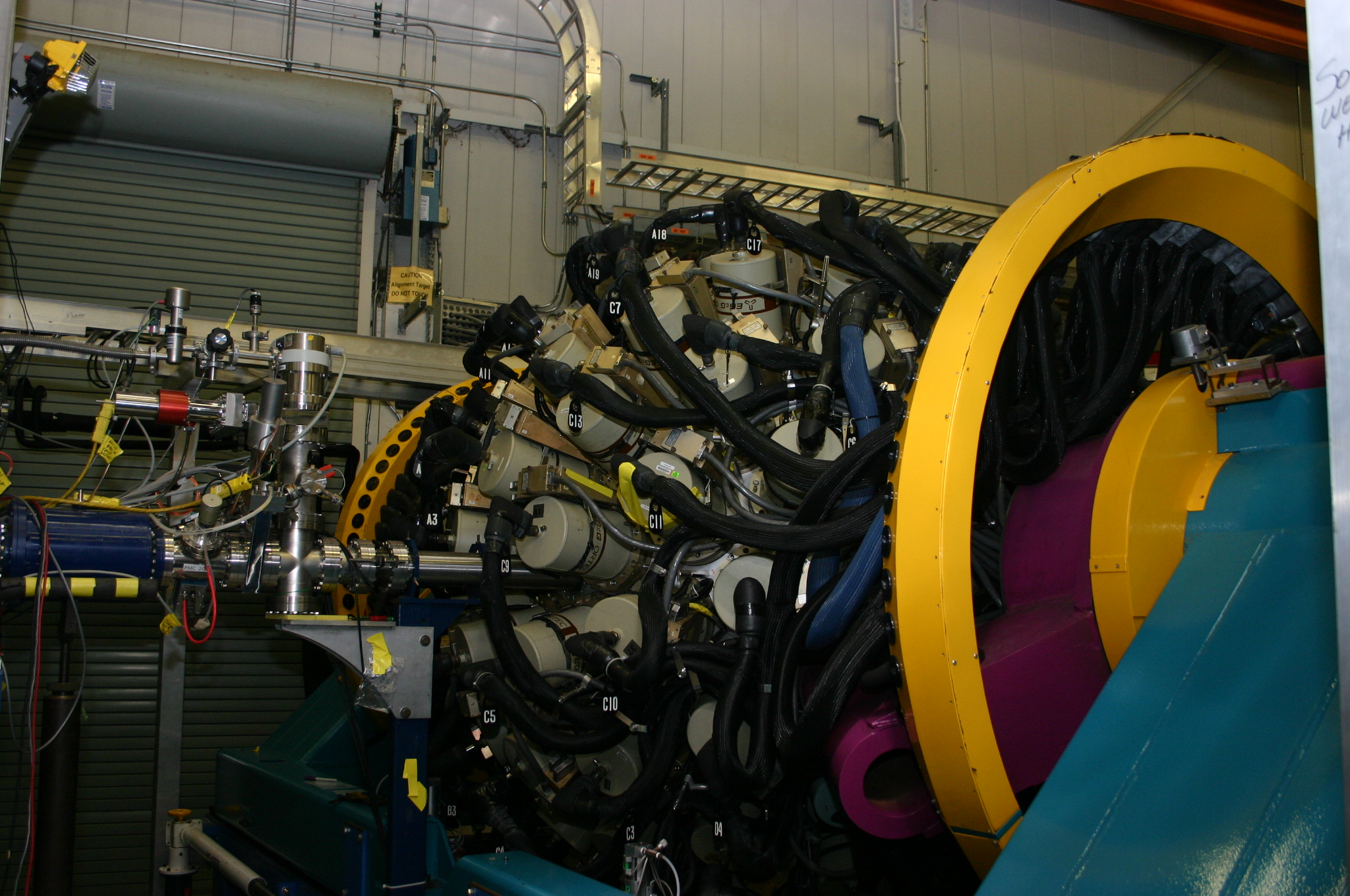
Gammasphere gamma ray spectrometer at Argonne National Laboratory

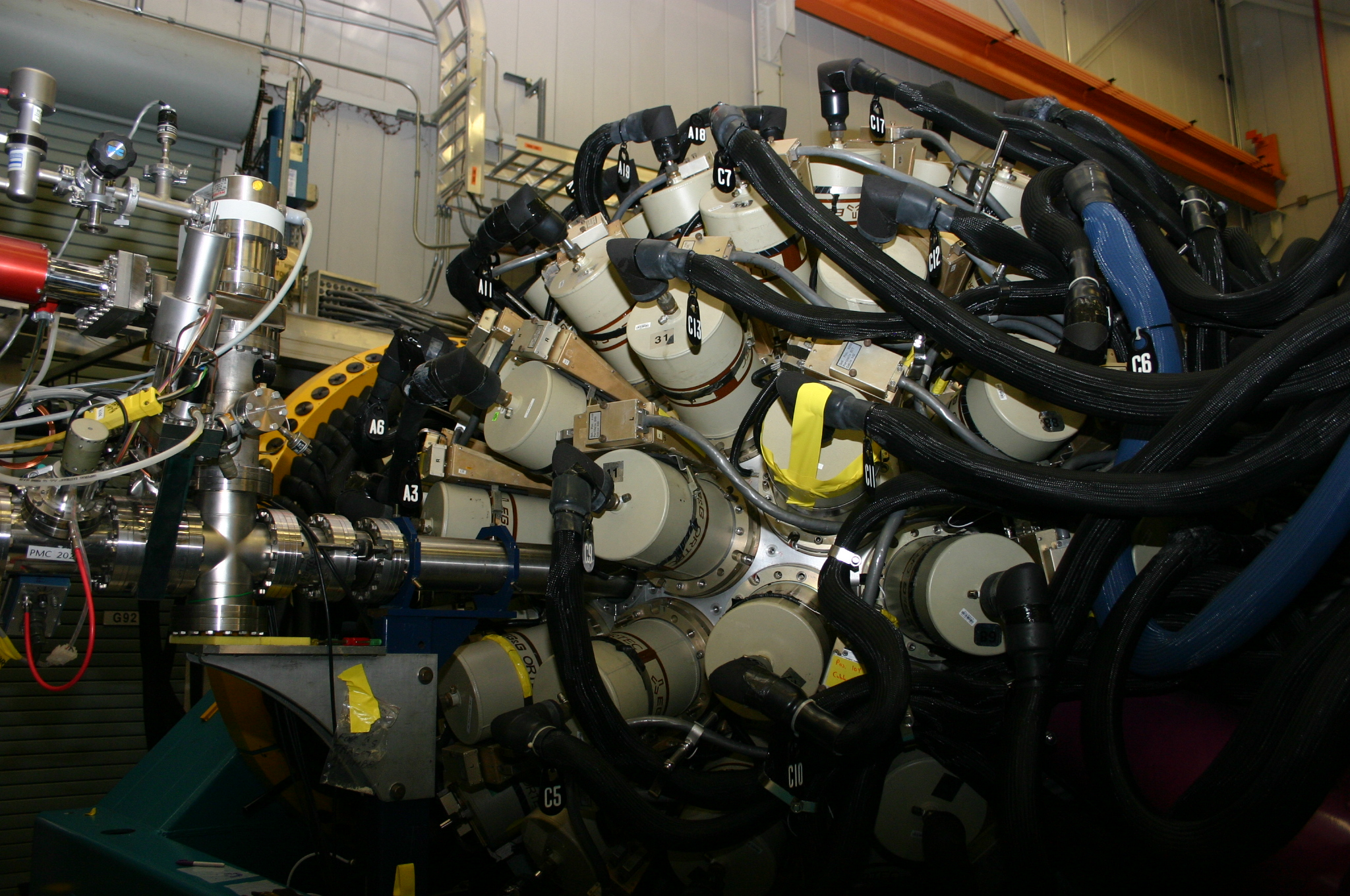
Another angle of the Gammasphere

The Gammasphere is a third generation gamma ray spectrometer used to study rare and exotic nuclear physics. It consists of 110 Compton-suppressed large volume, high-purity germanium detectors arranged in a spherical shell.

Gammasphere has been used to perform a variety of experiments in nuclear physics. Most experiments involve using heavy ion nuclear fusion to form a highly excited atomic nucleus. This nucleus may then emit protons, neutrons, or alpha particles followed by a shower of tens of gamma rays. Gammasphere is used to measure properties of these gamma-rays for tens of millions of such gamma ray showers. The resultant data are analyzed to gain a deeper understanding of the properties of nuclei.

Gammasphere was built in the early 1990s and has operated at the 88-inch cyclotron at Berkeley National Laboratory and at Argonne National Laboratory.

In the movie Hulk, Bruce Banner is zapped by a machine called the Gammasphere. The actual Gammasphere, which detects rather than emits gamma rays, was used as a model for the device shown in the movie.

== See also ==
- Canadian Penning Trap Mass Spectrometer
- Helical Orbit Spectrometer (HELIOS)
