= Ràdio Ciutat de Badalona =

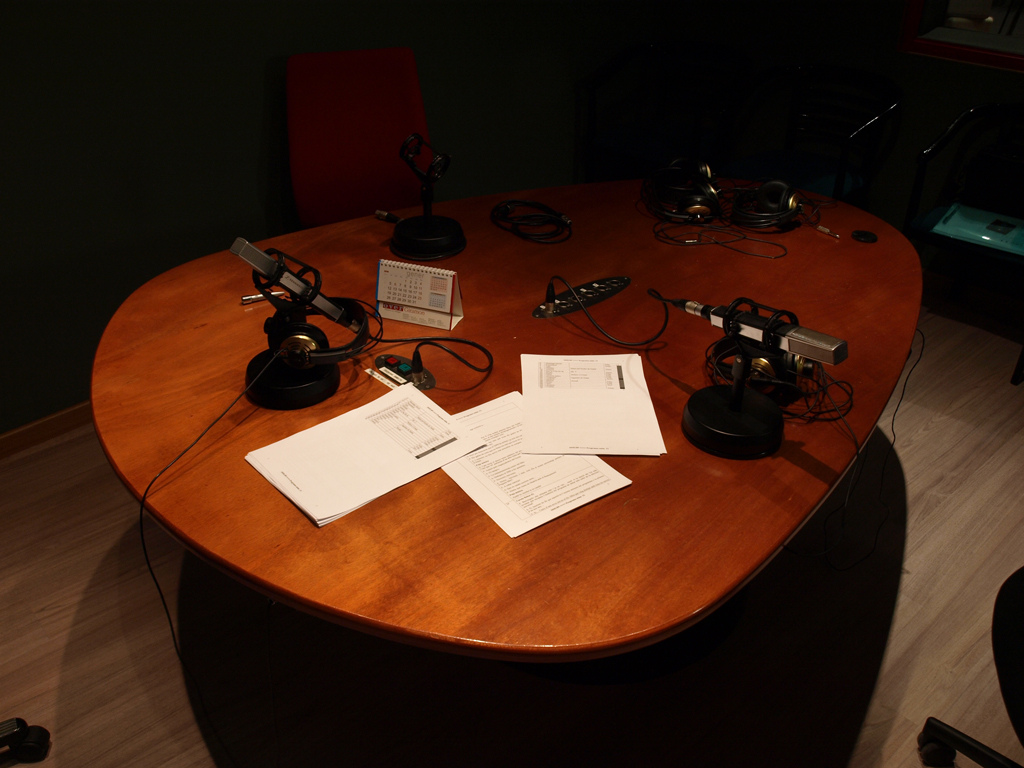
Studio 3 of RCB

Ràdio Ciutat de Badalona (RCB) is the municipal public radio station of Badalona (Barcelona). Founded in July 1981, it broadcasts 24 hours a day via FM on frequency 94.4, and streams live on the Internet via rcb.cat

Studios of the station are situated at 11 San Agustí Street, Badalona, in the neighborhood of Morera. RCB is part of the city's communication group Badalona Comunicació, which also includes the station, Televisió de Badalona (TVB) and the monthly local magazine Bétulo. The director of Ràdio Ciutat de Badalona is Franc Famades, a journalist who also heads TVB. The program director is Juanjo Zambrano and the information director Jordi Martí.

== History ==
In 1981 Badalona became the first major city in Catalonia to create a municipal station, through the founding of Radio Cuitat. This became a communication channel for all Badalonian people.

The information, the music and especially the sports have been from day one quality the hallmark of the station which has been with local sports broadcasts both the CF Badalona and the Joventut Badalona.

The oldest program is Safari Pop, which is broadcast from 1988.

The programming has always been a current affairs magazine in the morning, with different formats, but focused primarily on the daily development of the information in the city and another in the afternoon, and containing more sociocultural.

Some of Radio Ciutat magazine programs have been:

- Les boges d’abril
- Matins al punt
- Això va així
- Badalona al dia
- L’últim avís
- Bdn
- Truca’m més tard
- 5 minuts més
- Ciutat oberta
