= Weapon X (disambiguation) =

Weapon X is a fictional government project in Marvel Comics.

Weapon X may also refer to:

- Weapon X (story arc), a comic book story arc by Barry Windsor-Smith and published by Marvel Comics
- Wolverine (character) or Weapon X, a comic book character
- Garrison Kane or Weapon X, a comic book character
- Brian Dawkins or Weapon X, former NFL safety
- Weapon X, a fictional team in Exiles
- "Weapon X", a 2007 single by X-Clan from Return from Mecca
