= Tandem Accelerator Superconducting Cyclotron =

Defunct particle accelerator in Chalk River, Ontario, Canada

Tandem Accelerator Superconducting Cyclotron (TASCC) was a Canadian particle accelerator facility constructed at Chalk River Laboratories on October 3, 1986. TASCC was the world's first Tandem Accelerator and able to accelerate most elements to 10 MeV per nucleon. The TASCC facility was decommissioned beginning in 1996.

== See also ==
- Canadian Penning Trap Mass Spectrometer
