= Project X (2016 film) =

- The poster of Project X
- Directed by: Laura Poitras; Henrik Moltke
- Written by: Laura Poitras; Henrik Moltke
- Produced by: Yoni Golijov; Henrik Moltke
- Narrated by: Rami Malek; Michelle Williams
- Cinematography: Jarred Alterman; Henrik Moltke
- Edited by: Nels Bangerter
- Music by: Christopher Holmes
- Production companies: Praxis Films; Field of Vision
- Release date: November 26, 2016
- Running time: 10 min.
- Country: United States
- Language: English

Project X is an American short documentary film written by Laura Poitras and Henrik Moltke. It was based on a joint investigation by the magazine The Intercept and the video-journalism platform Field of Vision. It was reportedly based on classified NSA documents. It was produced by Praxis Films and Field of Vision and released on the Filed of Vision platform November 26, 2016.

The documentary, narrated by Michelle Williams and Rami Malek, features Titanpointe, focusing on the mass surveillance (under the code-named FAIRVIEW program) which was conducted by the NSA with help from AT&T, the building operator.

The narration includes read-outs of the classified reports from a handbook for undercover domestic travel, a leaked engineering report and an internal newsletter, which were provided by whistleblower and former NSA contractor Edward Snowden, as well as open sources.

It partook at the Curtas Vila do Conde 25th International Film Festival, conducted between July 8–16, 2017, as International Competition without winning any awards, and was invited to the Full Frame Documentary Film Festival in the same year.

== Reception ==
Le Cinéma Club's Maxwell Paparella called it "an unsettling study of surveillance architecture", noting that "the directors make full use of the cinematic power of implication, submitting a correlation of sound and image which cannot yet be proven beyond a doubt".

Charlie Lyne of the Guardian called it a "a remarkable new short", likening the monotone narration of Williams and Malek to characters of the 1970s American spy thrillers.

On an interview article with the directors, Eric Hynes of Field of Vision, the platform where the documentary was released, characterized it as "evocative, mysterious, visually and sonically complex, dramatically effective and innovative, and artistically irreducible".

External media

Audio
- Podcast interview of Poitras and Moltke about Project X, Pure Non Fiction with Thom Powers, retrieved November 26, 2025

Video
- Full documentary, website of Field of Vision, retrieved November 26, 2025
- Full documentary, website of Praxis Films, retrieved November 26, 2025

== See also ==
- Fairview surveillance program
- 2010s global surveillance disclosures
- Laura Poitras
