= TRIUMF =

Particle physics laboratory in Canada

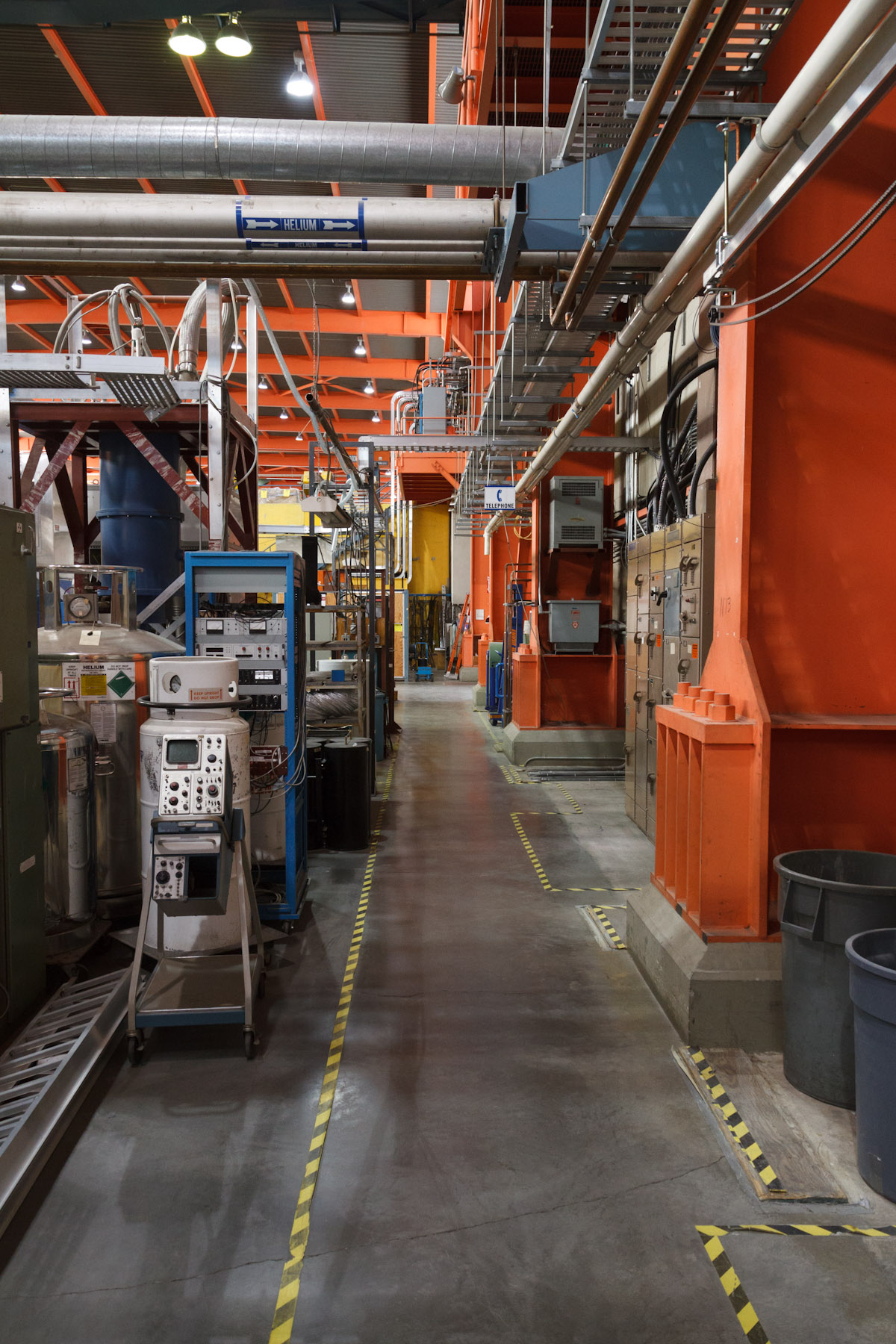
- Formation: 1968
- Location: Point Grey campus lands, Electoral Area A, Metro Vancouver, British Columbia
- Coordinates: 49.247792°N 123.230596°W
- Region served: Worldwide
- Services: Research and Development
- Staff: ~500
- Website: www.triumf.ca

TRIUMF Main Cyclotron
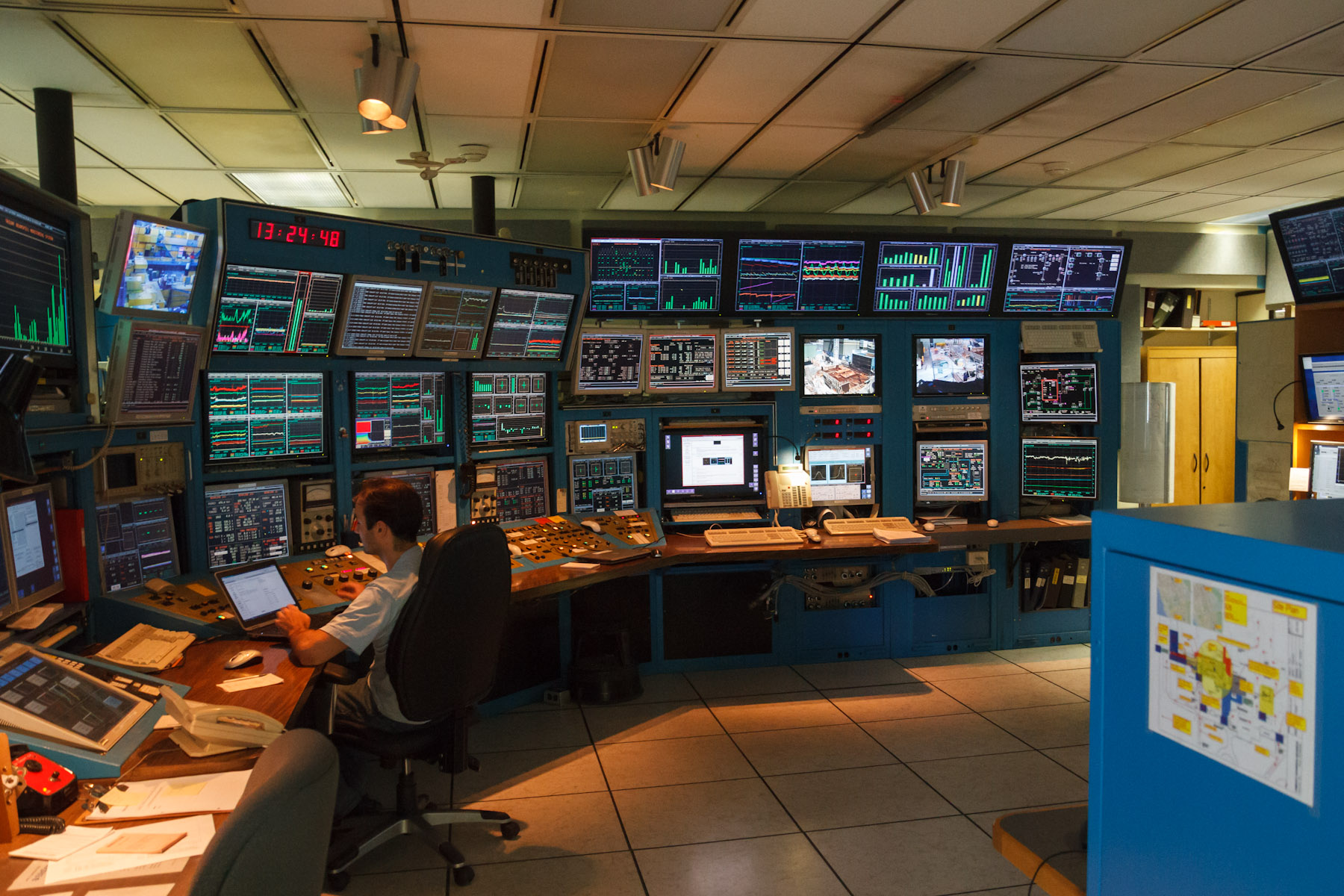
- Control room of the TRIUMF main cyclotron.

General properties
- Accelerator type: cyclotron
- Beam type: proton
- Target type: Fixed target

Beam properties
- Maximum energy: 520 MeV
- Maximum current: 400 μA

Physical properties
- Radius: 28 feet (8.5 m)
- Location: Point Grey campus lands, Electoral Area A, Metro Vancouver, British Columbia
- Institution: Consortium of twelve Canadian universities
- Dates of operation: 1974–present

TRIUMF is Canada's national particle accelerator centre. It is considered Canada's premier physics laboratory, and consistently regarded as one of the world's leading subatomic physics research centres. Owned and operated by a consortium of universities, it is on the south campus of one of its founding members, the University of British Columbia near Vancouver, British Columbia, Canada. It houses the world's largest normal conducting cyclotron, a source of 520 MeV protons, which was named an IEEE Milestone in 2010. Its accelerator-focused activities involve particle physics, nuclear physics, nuclear medicine, materials science, and detector and accelerator development.

Over 500 scientists, engineers, technicians, tradespeople, administrative staff, postdoctoral fellows, and students work at the site. It attracts over 1000 national and international researchers every year, and has generated over $1 billion in economic activity over the last decade.

To develop TRIUMF's research priorities, physicists based at the facility and the university follow the Natural Sciences and Engineering Research Council's (NSERC) long-range plan for subatomic physics. TRIUMF also has over 50 international agreements for collaborative research.

Asteroid 14959 TRIUMF is named in honour of the laboratory.

== History ==
TRIUMF was founded in 1968 by Simon Fraser University, the University of British Columbia, and the University of Victoria to meet research needs that no single university could provide. The name TRIUMF was originally an acronym based on TRI University Meson Facility, but no longer reflects its current state as a consortium of 21 member universities across Canada.

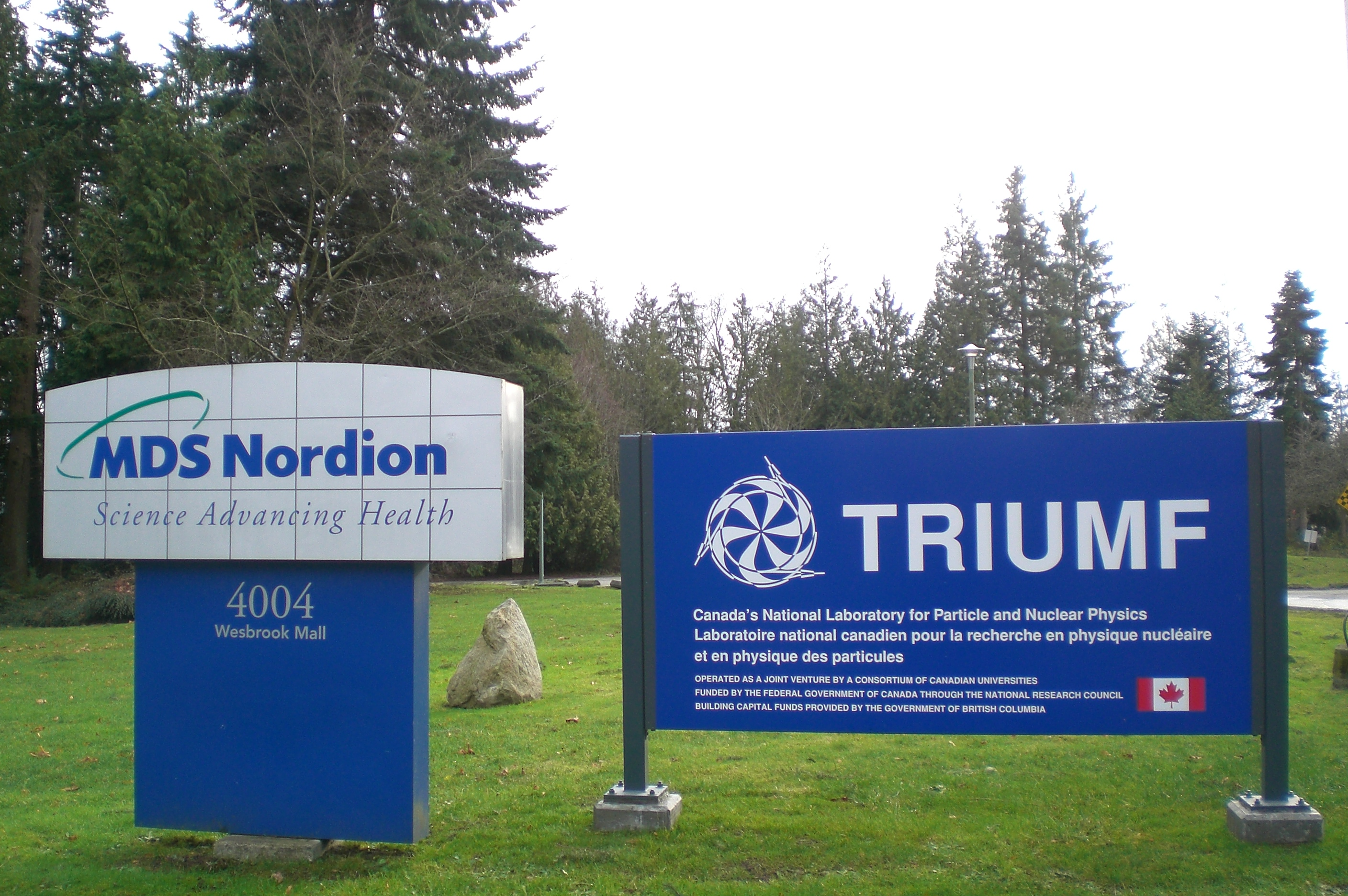
TRIUMF entrance

Since its inception as a local university facility, it has evolved into a national laboratory while maintaining strong ties to Canadian universities' research programs. Its related fields of study have expanded from nuclear physics to include particle physics, molecular and materials science, nuclear medicine, and accelerator research and development.

TRIUMF's 520 MeV cyclotron was officially commissioned on February 9, 1976 by Pierre Trudeau, the 15th prime minister of Canada, who said, "I don't really know what a cyclotron is, but I am certainly very happy Canada has one."

Before the Riken SRC (superconducting ring cyclotron) was built, TRIUMF was the world's largest cyclotron in terms of weight and beam or magnetic field radius. The Riken SRC is now heavier than the TRIUMF cyclotron, but TRIUMF has the largest beam radius and largest vacuum tank. Riken's magnetic field covers from 3.5 m to 5.5 m radius with maximum beam radius of about 5 metres (200 in), while TRIUMF's field goes from 0 to about 320 inches radius with maximum beam radius of 310 inches, as it requires a lower magnetic field to reduce EM stripping.

=== Laboratory directors ===
TRIUMF has had nine directors of its operations:

- John Warren – 1968–1971
- John Reginald Richardson – 1971–1976
- Jack Sample – 1976–1981
- Erich Vogt – 1981–1994
- Alan Astbury – 1994–2001
- Alan Shotter – 2001–2007
- Nigel S. Lockyer – 2007–2013
- Jonathan A. Bagger – 2014–2020
- Nigel J. T. Smith – 2021–present

=== Historic timeline ===
1965 – BC nuclear physicists agree on meson facility

1968 – John Warren becomes first director of TRIUMF

1969 – TRIUMF holds opening ceremony

1970 – Ground-breaking ceremony

1971 – Cyclotron assembly begins, Reginald Richardson becomes director of TRIUMF

1974 – Cyclotron produces its first beam

1975 – Proton science program initiated, first polarized proton beam, first μSR experiment at TRIUMF

1976 – Pierre Elliot Trudeau's official dedication, Dr. Erich Vogt becomes an Officer of the Order of Canada, Jack Sample becomes director of TRIUMF

1977 – Medium-resolution spectrometer MRS in operation, first Ph.Ds using TRIUMF beams

1978 – Neutron activation analysis started, AECL/Nordion agreement for medical isotope production, first production of Iodine-123 on Beamline 4A for distribution in Canada

1979 – First new pion/muon beamline M13, pion cancer therapy program initiated

1980 – PET camera construction begins (2nd in Canada), TPC built to study rare decas (1st used in an experiment)

1981 – KAON Factory studies initiated, Erich Vogt becomes director of TRIUMF

1982 – Isotope pipeline to UBC hospital installed, completion of n-p and p-p program, AECL Commercial Products ships first isotopes from TRIUMF

1983 – PET dedicated by the Queen, first commercial cyclotron on site, first isotope separation on-line (ISOL) study

1985 – First purpose-built surface muon channel, NSERC funds HERA beamline at the DESY Lab in Germany

1986 – Contribution to 50 MeV beamline to HERA on behalf of Canada

1987 – Yamasaki awarded Imperial Medal (μSR cited), TISOL facility produces first radioactive beam, University of Manitoba and Université de Montréal become associate members, TRIUMF becomes Canada's national meson facility

1988 – EBCO makes first 30 MeV medical cyclotron, KAON Factory project-definition study funded, University of Toronto becomes an associate member

1989 – NRC adds Tech Transfer to TRIUMF mandate, University of Regina becomes an associate member

1990 – TR-30 installed, ISACI(isotope accelerator) design begins

1991 – Buckyballs studied by μSR, Second arm spectrometer SASP completed

1992 – Rob Kiefl wins Herzberg Medal for MuSR studies, TISOL Red Giant ^{12}C(α,γ)

1993 – Atom trapping begins at TRIUMF, TR-13 medical cyclotron installed

1994 – Alan Astbury becomes director of TRIUMF, ATLAS and LHC involvement at CERN initiated

1995 – Ocular melanoma treatment begins, TRINAT first traps atoms, HERMES detector components to HERA, commercial radiation effect testing with protons begin

1996 – BaBar central wire chamber construction approved

1997 – ISAC-I civil construction begins, TWIST approved, SNO involvement begins, DRAGON experiment proposed

1998 – First beam from ISAC-I, Carleton University and Queens University become associate members, BaBar central wire chamber delivered, NSERC funds DRAGON

1999 – World's highest proton beam current ISOL (isotope online) facility, lifetime measurements of 37-K at ISAC, TRIUMF becomes Canada's National Laboratory for Particle and Nuclear Physics

2000 – Carleton University becomes a full member, McMaster University becomes an associate member, ISAC-II approved, ISAC-I accelerates first stable beam, CSI awarded for new PET, 8π spectrometer moved to TRIUMF

2001 – ISAC first accelerated rare-isotopes, first ISAC-I PRL, TUDA and DRAGON commissioned

2002 – Initial TIGRESS funding, TITAN development begins

2003 – University of Guelph becomes associate member, ISAC-II building opened, LHC magnets delivered to Geneva, Switzerland, ATLAS Tier-1 first CPUs received

2004 – University of Toronto becomes a full member, Saint Mary's University becomes an associate member, Seaborg Award to Don Fleming for pioneering work in muonium, charge radius of ^{11}Li measured, T2K collaboration with J-PARC begins, Synergy Award for collaboration between TRIUMF and Nordion

2005 – 100th patient treated for ocular melanoma, TUDA ^{21}Na(ρ,ρ')^{21}Na results published, Jean-Michel Poutissou awarded Legion of Honour (France), first muon decay results from TWIST experiment

2006 – DRAGON ^{26}Al(ρ,γ)^{27}Si results published

2007 – Université de Montréal becomes a full member, Synergy Award for collaboration between TRIUMF and D-PACE, Nigel Lockyer becomes director of TRIUMF, first ISAC-II experiment ^{11}Li(ρ,t)^{9}Li measurement with MAYA, mass measurement of ^{11}Li (shortest-lived and lightest ion ever measured in Penning trap)

2008 – TUDA measurement of ^{18}F(ρ,α)^{15}O, TRIUMF forms AAPS (Advanced Applied Physics Solutions) with CECR Research and development partnership with VECC Laboratory, Kolkata, India begins, Mass measurement of ^{6}He (lightest ever so measured)

2009 – TIGRESS fully operational, new Nordion/TRIUMF radio-chemistry R&D initiative, TWIST obtains final results on muon decay, M9 beam line upgrade completed

2010 – ARIEL (Advanced Rare IsotopE Laboratory) project begins, first actinide target at ISAC

2011 – TRIUMF sets a world record for isotope production

2015 – A TRIUMF-led multidisciplinary consortium is awarded the NSERC Brockhouse Canada Prize for Interdisciplinary Research in Science and Engineering for their outstanding collaboration in realizing a solution for the safe and reliable production of the critical medical isotope technetium-99m using cyclotrons. The consortium includes physics, chemistry, and nuclear medicine experts from TRIUMF, the BC Cancer Agency, the Centre for Probe Development and Commercialization (CPDC), the Lawson Health Research Institute, and the University of British Columbia

2018 – TRIUMF Celebrates its semicentennial, 50-years of operations, since receiving first funding.

2020 – TRIUMF becomes an incorporated entity. TRIUMF Inc. is a not-for-profit registered charity.

== Canadian university partners ==
TRIUMF is owned and operated as a joint venture by a consortium of 21 universities, including 14 full and 7 associate members. The member universities consist of the University of Alberta, the University of British Columbia, Carleton University, University of Guelph, University of Manitoba, Université de Montréal, Simon Fraser University, Queen's University, University of Toronto, University of Victoria, University of Waterloo, and York University. The associate universities consist of the University of Calgary, McMaster University, University of Northern British Columbia, University of Regina, McGill University, Saint Mary's University, Université de Sherbrooke, the University of Winnipeg, and Western University.

== Organizational structure ==
TRIUMF is organized into four divisions that focus on varying aspects of research and operations:

- The Accelerator Division, responsible for the operation, maintenance, and upgrades required for all of the 520 MeV Cyclotron, ISAC, and TR-13 facilities. It is also responsible for the design, construction and commissioning of future on-site accelerators, and provides support for external accelerator projects.
- The Engineering Division, responsible for the engineering, design and fabrication of mechanical, structural and electronic components, and for electrical and mechanical services and site maintenance.
- The Physical Sciences Division, responsible for scheduling experiments approved by the Experimental Evaluation Committee (EEC), and for the design, installation, operation and maintenance of components, systems and subsystems for all experimental operations at the site. It is also responsible for the coordination of infrastructure support for external programs.
- The Life Sciences Division, responsible for the support of projects approved by the Life Science Projects Evaluation Committee (LSPEC), and provides support for collaborations with the Pacific Parkinson's Research Centre (PPRC), BC Cancer (BCC), BWXT and other university faculties relying on radio-tracers from TRIUMF for their research. It is also responsible for the design, installation, operation and maintenance of components, systems and subsystems for the radioisotope production and processing facilities for tracers to be used in research projects both at TRIUMF and other laboratories. TRIUMF's nuclear medicine department is part of this division.

The Office of the Director, supported by the Deputy Directors of Research and Operations, has general oversight for:

- The facility's administrative departments, including accounting and finance, environmental health and safety, general administration and security, human resources, procurement, quality assurance, strategic planning, communications and outreach, and supply chain management
- The Applied Technology Group, consisting of several work teams including Isotope production, cyclotron operations, and technical support, which focuses on the production of radioactive isotopes for use by the medical isotope division of BWX Technologies (formerly Nordion), which are ultimately deployed in the development of drugs and diagnosis and treatment of disease.

Additionally, TRIUMF Innovations (link to website) is TRIUMF's commercialization arm, linking its laboratories activities with tangible business and commercialization opportunities. Established in 2017, it replaced Advanced Applied Physics Solutions, Inc. (AAPS), TRIUMF's previous commercialization entity.

== Experiments ==
As TRIUMF has selectively applied its expertise to other areas of research, and to the generation of entrepreneurial opportunities, its core program of nuclear, particle and accelerator physics has expanded to cover key areas in life, molecular and materials sciences.

=== Main cyclotron and proton beam lines ===
At the heart of TRIUMF is the 520 MeV cyclotron that produces the primary proton beams. A large fraction of the TRIUMF program relies on these beams, including the ISAC, the Centre for Molecular and Materials Science programs in μSR and β-NMR, and the Proton Treatment Facility. The operation of the main cyclotron has enabled TRIUMF to acquire the expertise to operate the three medical cyclotrons for BWXT Medical and the TR-13 medical cyclotron used to produce medical isotopes, and assist companies to exploit commercial opportunities for the sale of cyclotron and other accelerator technologies.

==== The 520 MeV cyclotron ====
TRIUMF produces negatively charged hydrogen ions (H^{−}: 1 proton, 2 electrons) from an ion source. The ions are transported through an evacuated electrostatic beam line containing elements to focus and steer the beam over 60m to the cyclotron. The 520 MeV (million electron volts) variable energy cyclotron accelerates these ions with a high frequency alternating electric field and uses a massive six-sector magnet to confine the beam in an outward spiral trajectory. Inserting a very thin graphite extraction foil strips, or removes, the electrons from the H^{−} ion while allowing the proton to pass through. The proton, because it is a positively charged particle, is deflected in the outward direction due to the magnetic field and is directed to a proton beam line.

The accelerating process takes approximately 0.3 ms before the proton achieves three-quarters the speed of light. The success of TRIUMF's programs depends on the ability to deliver protons from the cyclotron reliably. Typically, the cyclotron, although over 35 years old, averages an up-time of greater than 90% (2000–2007), with the 15-year average just under 90%. Typically the beam is delivered for about 5,000 hours per year with one major (three month) and one minor (one month) maintenance periods. The cyclotron beam properties and capabilities have improved over the years as a result of systems upgrades and the fundamental infrastructure providing the magnetic and electrical fields and the RF resonators as well as the vacuum vessel will serve TRIUMF for many more years.

==== The Four Proton Beamlines ====
TRIUMF has four independent extraction probes with various sizes of foils to provide protons simultaneously to up to four beam lines. Because of the high energy of the proton beam, these beamlines use magnetic rather than electrostatic focusing and steering elements.

Beamline 1A (BL1A)
can deliver 180 to 500 MeV protons to two target systems. The beam power ranges from 50 to 75 kW. The first target, T1, services three experimental channels. The second target, T2, services two μSR experimental channels. Downstream of T2 is a 500 MeV facility used to produce strontium isotopes for medical-imaging generators as well as the Thermal Neutron Facility (TNF).

Beamline 1B
separates off BL1 at the edge of the cyclotron vault and provides international users with the Proton Irradiation Facility (PIF) that is used for radiation testing of electronic circuits, for example, mimicking space radiation for testing computer chips.

Beamline 1U (BL1U)
shares the proton beam with beamline 1A and is designed to divert up to 20 kW of its beam power onto a spallation source for ultracold neutrons, which can be used to study fundamental properties of the neutron.

Beamline 2A (BL2A)
capable of providing 475 to 500 MeV proton beams at up to 50 kW to the ISAC target facility that produces rare-isotope ion beams for a host of Canadian and international experiments.

Beamline 2C (BL2C)
used for the Proton Therapy Program to treat choroidal melanomas (eye tumours) and proton irradiation to produce strontium isotopes, which are chemically processed and then used for medical imaging generators. This beam line also has the flexibility to provide protons of lower energy for PIF users. The energy range for this line is 70 to 120 MeV.

Beamline 4 North (BL4N)
will be a new 500 MeV beamline used for the proposed expansion of ISAC with a specialized actinide target. It is under construction as of 2023.

=== ISAC and ARIEL facilities for rare-isotope beams ===
The ISAC and ARIEL (under construction) facilities produces and uses heavy ion beams to produce short-lived isotopes for study. Proton beam from the main accelerator is used as a driver beam at ISAC via beamline BL2A and one of the two ARIEL target stations via beamline BL4N (under construction) to produce beams of exotic isotopes which are further accelerated using linear accelerators. The second target station at ARIEL uses an electron beam from the TRIUMF elinac as a driver beam. Several experiments study the properties and structure of these exotic isotopes along with their nucleosynthesis. Between ISAC-I and ISAC-II, many experiments can be completed.

==== ISAC-I facility ====
In the ISAC-I facility, 500 MeV protons at up to 100 μA can be steered onto one of two production targets to produce radioactive isotopes. The isotopes pass through a heated tube to a source where they are ionized, accelerated off the source's high-voltage platform at up to 60 kV and sent through a mass separator to select the ion beam of choice. The beam is transported in the low-energy beam transport (LEBT) electrostatic beam line and sent via a switch-yard to either the low-energy experimental area or to a series of room-temperature accelerating structures to the ISAC-I medium-energy experimental area. Experiments at ISAC-I include:

===== 8π spectrometer =====
A microscope used to examine the behaviour of atomic nuclear produced, which are collected at the centre of 8pi where they undergo radioactive decay. The main component of the 8π spectrometer are the Hyper-pure Germanium detectors used to observe gamma rays emitted from excited states of daughter nuclei.

===== DRAGON =====
The Detector of Recoils And Gammas Of Nuclear Reactions (DRAGON) is an apparatus designed to measure the rates of nuclear reactions important in astrophysics, particularly nucleosynthesis reactions which occur in the explosives environments of nova, supernova, and x-ray bursters.

===== Laser spectroscopy =====
The Collinear Fast-Beam Laser Spectroscopy (CFBS) experiment at TRIUMF is designed to exploit the high beam-intensity and radioisotope-production capability of TRIUMF's ISAC facility, as well as modern ion-trap beam-cooling techniques, in order to measure the hyperfine energy levels and isotope shifts of short-lived isotopes using laser spectroscopy.

===== TITAN =====
TRIUMF's Ion Trap for Atomic and Nuclear Science (TITAN) measures the mass of short-lived isotopes with high precision. Radioactive isotopes from ISAC are sent to TITAN to undergo cooling, charge-breeding and trapping. The entire process occurs in about 10 milliseconds, allowing radioactive isotopes with short half-lives to be studied.

===== TRINAT =====
TRINAT, TRIUMF's Neutral Atom Trap, holds a cluster of neutral atoms suspended in a very small space, in high vacuum, allowing for the study of decay products of radioactive atoms.

==== ISAC-II facility ====
The rare-isotope beams produced in the ISAC-II facility are transported in the low-energy beam transport (LEBT) electrostatic beam line and sent via a switch-yard to either the low-energy experimental area or to a series of room-temperature accelerating structures in the ISAC-I medium-energy experimental area. For high-energy delivery, the drift tube linac (DTL) beam is deflected north along an S-bend transfer line to the ISAC-II superconducting linear accelerator (SC-linac) for acceleration above the Coulomb barrier (5–11 MeV/u). TRIUMF began developing superconducting accelerator technology in 2001 and is now a leader in the field with a demonstrated accelerating gradient (at low beta) significantly above other operating facilities. Experiments at ISAC-II include:

===== EMMA =====
The ElectroMagnetic Mass Analyzer (EMMA) (completion date 2016) is a recoil mass spectrometer for TRIUMF's ISAC-II facility. ISAC-II will provide intense beams of radioactive ions with masses up to 150 atomic mass units to international scientists studying nuclear structure and nuclear astrophysics. The energies of these beams will depend on the specific nuclei being accelerated, but typical top speeds will range from 10–20% of the speed of light.

===== HERACLES =====
Formerly known as the Chalk River/Laval array, HERACLES consists of 150 scintillators detectors covering almost 4-pi. It was used in over a dozen of experiments in the last ten years for multi-fragmentation studies at intermediate energies (10 to 100 MeV/A).

===== TIGRESS =====
The TRIUMF-ISAC Gamma-Ray Escape Suppressed Spectrometer (TIGRESS) is a state-of-the art new gamma-ray spectrometer designed for a broad program of nuclear physics research with the accelerated radioactive ion beams provided by the ISAC-II superconducting linear accelerator.

==== ISAC-I/II ====
The experiments listed below utilize both facilities.

===== TUDA =====
A general purpose facility for studying nuclear reactions of astrophysical significance with solid state detectors.

===== TACTIC =====
An ionization chamber with full track reconstruction capabilities for studying reactions of astrophysical importance.

===== DSL =====
TRIUMF's Doppler Shift Lifetimes facility, which is an experimental setup for the measurement of the lifetimes of excited states of nuclei.

=== ATLAS Canadian Tier-1 Data Centre ===
The ATLAS experiment at the Large Hadron Collider (LHC) at CERN uses proton-proton collisions at the highest energy ever achieved in the laboratory to look for the Higgs Boson, the particle central to the current model of how subatomic particles attain mass. ATLAS will also search for phenomena "beyond the standard model" of particle physics such as supersymmetry, extra dimensions, and quark compositeness. The ATLAS detector will observe the particles emerging from the roughly 900 million proton-proton collisions per second and, although fast electronics will filter the events so that only those most likely to be of interest will be recorded, ATLAS will produce 3.5–5.0 petabytes of data per year (one petabyte is one million gigabytes). In addition, secondary data sets will be produced that could double the amount of data produced.

In order to analyze this substantial amount of information, CERN coordinates an international network of large high-performance computing centres that are linked by grid computing tools to act as one large system. This network is called the Worldwide LHC Computing Grid (WLCG). The Canadian Tier-1 Data Centre, located at TRIUMF, works with nine of the other ATLAS Tier-1 centres in the world to process the raw data produced by the experiment. In addition, Tier-2 centres located in universities, both in Canada and abroad, are used to further process the results of the Tier-1 analysis and extract results from the data. The Tier-2 centres will also be the primary sites for computer simulations of ATLAS, an important part of the data analysis.

=== Centre for Molecular and Materials Science ===
TRIUMF uses subatomic particles as probes of materials structure at the Centre for Molecular and Materials Science (CMMS). The chief techniques are μSR and β-NMR.

==== μSR ====
TRIUMF utilizes a technique called μSR, a powerful probe into materials like semiconductors, magnets and superconductors. Beams of positive muons are created with their spins lined up in the same direction. When these beams are shot into a material, the muons' spins precess (wobble like a top) around the local magnetic fields in the material. The unstable muons soon decay into positrons; since these antielectrons tend to be emitted in the direction of the muons' spin, μSR scientists can examine how the internal magnetic fields of different materials have affected the muons' spins by observing the directions in which the positrons are emitted.

==== β-NMR ====
β detected NMR is an exotic form of nuclear magnetic resonance (NMR) in which the nuclear spin precession signal is detected through the beta decay of a radioactive nucleus. The central question to be studied is how the local electronic and magnetic properties near an interface or surface of new materials (e.g.,. a high Tc superconductor) differ from those of the bulk.

=== Detector development ===
TRIUMF uses its expertise gained from the development of detectors for particle and nuclear physics, in collaboration with Canadian universities, to support advanced detector development, including for molecular and materials sciences and nuclear medicine. TRIUMF's Science and Technology Department designs and constructs complete detector systems including mechanics, services, front end electronics, digital signal processing and data acquisition.

=== Nuclear medicine laboratories ===
The core of the TRIUMF nuclear medicine program is Positron Emission Tomography or PET imaging, a technique whereby tiny amounts of radioactive nuclei known as radioisotopes are combined with certain bio-molecules and injected into the body. The biomolecules can be "traced" by imaging the decay products (two photons produced by the decay of the radioactive nucleus via the emission of a positron) outside the body. PET allows the concentration of positron-labeled compounds to be determined quantitatively in space and time within the living body. PET is more sensitive than any other human imaging method, such as MRI or CT, especially for the detection of cancer.

The PET program facilities at TRIUMF include cyclotron systems for the production of radioisotopes, chemistry labs for the synthesis of radiopharmaceuticals and quality control labs. TRIUMF currently uses the TR-13 medical cyclotron and target systems for the production of ^{18}F, ^{11}C, and ^{13}N. Radiopharmaceutical production facilities include the small modular clean room at the cyclotron for the synthesis of ^{18}F-fluorodeoxyglucose (FDG). for BCCA as well as three chemistry annex labs for production and development of radiopharmaceuticals used in brain research and other programs at UBC.

Pacific Parkinson's Research Centre (PPRC) is a joint TRIUMF/UBC program studying central nervous system disorders. Approximately 80% of the studies are related to Parkinson's disease, and the remainder are related to mood disorders and Alzheimer's disease. The program has explored the origins, progression, and therapies of the disease as well as the complications arising from therapy using molecular imaging as the primary tool.

The Functional Imaging Program at the BCCA is a collaboration among the agency, TRIUMF, UBC, and the BC Children's Hospital. Capital acquired through the BC Provincial Health Services Authority Emerging Technologies Fund allowed purchase of the province's first hybrid PET/CT scanner in 2004. The clinical PET/CT program, located at BCCA's Vancouver Centre, was enabled by TRIUMF supplying ^{18}F, the positron emitting radionuclide used in production of ^{18}F-fluorodeoxyglucose (FDG). FDG, as a marker of glucose metabolism, is the tracer used in oncologic PET imaging, a diagnostic study which has become a standard of care in the management of many cancer types.

=== Proton and neutron irradiation facilities ===
Beginning in 1995, TRIUMF has built up several beamlines that provide low-intensity, energetic proton and neutron beams to simulate radiation exposures either in space or terrestrial environments. Even at low intensity, several minutes of exposure in these beams can correspond to years of operation in space, air, or ground so that accelerated testing of electronics can be carried out.

These TRIUMF facilities, PIF & NIF, have since become recognized as premier test sites for space-radiation effects using protons and, with the capability of using these protons to produce a neutron-energy spectrum similar to that found at aircraft altitudes and at ground level, testing with neutrons is also possible. A large fraction of the proton users are Canadian space-related companies such as MDA Corporation, while neutron use is primarily by international companies for avionics, microelectronics and communications equipment, such as The Boeing Company or Cisco Systems, Inc.

Additionally, one of the beamlines was used for the cancer treatment of ocular melanoma at the Proton Therapy Centre which was operated in conjunction with the BC Cancer Agency and the UBC Department of Ophthalmology. Before proton treatment became available, the most common course of action was removal of the eye. Other possible treatments included surgical removal of the tumour (which has severe limitations), or implanting a radioactive disk on the wall of the eye under the tumour for some days. These alternatives were unsuitable for large tumours, and could damage sensitive parts of the eye, often resulting in loss of vision. After proton therapy, however, patients can retain useful vision. The protons enter the eye at a carefully controlled energy, and come to rest at a precise, predictable distance inside. They deposit their energy of motion (kinetic energy) in a very narrow layer, destroying living cells in that layer. Because the beam of protons is so concentrated and deposits its energy so predictably, we can successfully destroy a tumour while better preserving the other nearby parts of the eye. The proton therapy program at TRIUMF was discontinued in 2019.

== External scientific collaborations ==
TRIUMF is also involved in the development and construction of detectors and equipment for larger particle physics experiments located all over the world.

=== ALPHA ===
The international ALPHA Collaboration, focused on trapping antihydrogen with experiments based at CERN, includes members from TRIUMF. The ALPHA-Canada team, led by TRIUMF research scientist Dr. Makoto C. Fujiwara, was recognized with the 2013 NSERC John C. Polanyi Award for their work with the ALPHA team at CERN in understanding antimatter. The Canadian team included over a dozen scientists and students working in plasma, atomic, condensed matter, particle, detector, and accelerator physics, from the University of British Columbia (UBC), Simon Fraser University (SFU), the University of Calgary, York University, and TRIUMF.

=== KEK ===
TRIUMF has a longstanding collaborative relationship with Japan's KEK, which was further enhanced in December, 2015 when it was announced that each organization would be establishing branch offices at the other's respective institution to facilitate the advancement of their physics research activities.

=== Large Hadron Collider ===
TRIUMF accelerator physicists, engineers, and technical personnel have unique expertise for the design and construction of critical parts of the accelerator, such as assembling the liquid argon end cap calorimeters for the ATLAS detector. As well, TRIUMF was involved in the construction and procurement of several magnets and power supplies for the LHC itself. The resulting accelerator contributions were a necessary part of the Canadian investment in the project. TRIUMF is also home to the ATLAS-Canada Tier-1 Data Centre, funded by the Canada Foundation for Innovation. This centre will pre-process the raw data from the experiment prior to analysis by Canadian and foreign researchers. It will also provide domestic detector experts access to raw data for detailed calibration and monitoring.

=== SNO ===
TRIUMF first became actively involved in the Sudbury Neutrino Observatory (SNO) when the project needed engineering help. TRIUMF's Design Office and Machine Shop built key components of the detector. Moreover, TRIUMF scientists were involved in the project which was honored with the 2015 Nobel Prize in Physics and the 2016 Fundamental Physics Prize for the discovery of neutrino oscillation.

=== SNOLAB ===
TRIUMF is involved with a number of projects at SNOLAB. Notable examples include the Helium and Lead Observatory (HALO) supernova neutrino detector which is part of the SuperNova Early Warning System (SNEWS) and Dark Matter Experiment using Argon Pulse-shape discrimination (DEAP) the most sensitive weakly interacting massive particle (WIMP) detector to date.

=== T2K ===
TRIUMF is part of the T2K (Tokai-to-Kamioka) neutrino oscillation experiment in Japan. TRIUMF is involved in constructing a time projection chamber and fine-grained detectors composed of plastic scintillators for the T2K near detector, to measure the properties of the neutrino beam at its production site in Tokai before it travels 295 km to Kamioka, over which distance neutrino oscillations are expected to take place.

== TRIUMF Users' Group ==
The TRIUMF Users Group (TUG) is an international community of scientists and engineers with a special interest in the use of the TRIUMF facility. Its purpose is:

- to provide a formal means for exchange of information relating to the development and use of the facility;
- to advise members of the entire TRIUMF organization of projects and facilities available;
- to provide an entity responsive to the representations of its members for offering advice and counsel to the TRIUMF management on operating policy and facilities.

Any qualified scientist can join the users group. The group's interests are looked after by an elected committee (TRIUMF Users' Executive Committee or TUEC). Part of TUEC's responsibilities is to organize meetings on behalf of the membership were necessary. At least one meeting, the annual general meeting (AGM), is held each year near the beginning of December. A link to the TUG website is listed in the external links below.

== See also ==
- Canadian government scientific research organizations
- Canadian university scientific research organizations
- Canadian industrial research and development organizations
