= Neutrino factory =

Proposed type of particle accelerator complex

A neutrino factory is a type of proposed particle accelerator complex intended to measure in detail the properties of neutrinos, which are extremely weakly interacting fundamental particles that can travel in straight lines through normal matter for thousands of kilometres. The source of the neutrinos would be the decay of accelerated muons in straight sections of a storage ring. The technical issues surrounding these projects are broadly similar to those of a muon collider.

== Function ==
A neutrino factory would create a fairly focused beam of neutrinos at one site on the Earth and fire it downwards, probably in two beams emitted in different directions from a racetrack shaped underground muon storage ring, until the beams resurface at other points. One example could be a complex in the UK sending beams to Japan (see Super-Kamiokande) and Italy (LNGS). The properties of the neutrinos would be examined at the remote sites to determine how neutrinos evolve over time. This would provide information about their masses and weak interaction properties.

The project is currently in the conceptual design stage. An international "Scoping Study" was completed in 2007 and an international effort proceeded to write a design report which inspired various later experimental concepts.

Many new technologies are being pioneered for this type of experiments, including the use of liquid metal jets as a target for pion production, under test in the "MERIT experiment". CERN., the use of Fixed Field Alternating Gradient (FFAG) accelerators, under test in the EMMA experiment, and liquid hydrogen energy reduction cavities for reducing the divergence in the muon beam during the intermediate stages.

== Scientific objectives ==
Up until the 1990s, neutrinos were assumed to be massless, but experimental results from searches for solar neutrinos (those produced in the Sun's core) and others are inconsistent with this assumption, and thus indicate that the neutrino does have a very small mass (see solar neutrino problem).

By producing an intense beam of muon and electron neutrinos, these accelerators would enable major advances in the study of neutrinos and their interactions, and would allor for:

- High-precision studies of neutrino oscillation parameters (in particular those related to electron neutrinos).
- The search for neutrino interactions beyond those predicted by the Standard Model of particle physics.
- The search for sterile neutrinos and light dark matter.

== Associated design efforts ==
=== International Design Study ===
The International Design Study seeks to present a design report for the Neutrino Factory that details the physics performance, schedule and costs by 2012. The study will include contributions from all regions in a combined Reference Design Report.

=== UK Neutrino Factory ===
There is a United Kingdom Neutrino Factory group.

=== U. S. Muon Accelerator Program ===
In 2010, the Muon Accelerator Program (MAP) unified the United States Department of Energy research support for Muon Colliders and Neutrino Factories. (Both projects involve producing muons and holding them in a storage ring, so there was much overlap.) The Muon Collider project is even more ambitious than the Neutrino Factory. In the Muon Collider, the muons will be inserted into a very high-energy collider ring, aiming to reach higher concentrations of energy than even the Large Hadron Collider (LHC) (first collisions produced in 2010) or perhaps even the Linear Collider Collaboration (LCC) experiments (design incomplete as of 2019.)

=== European Neutrino Group ===
CERN did a design study a few years ago, before effort moved on to the LHC. Activities in Europe continue with meetings and involvement in international experiments and collaborations.

=== Japanese design ===
This is based on an unusual type of accelerator called an Fixed Field Alternating Gradient (FFAG) that combines elements from the cyclotrons of the 1950s with modern automated magnet design processes, and new magnetic alloy radiofrequency accelerating gaps. The main advantage of these is that the magnetic fields are fixed and do not have to be synchronised to the beam in any way, yet the beam naturally moves into regions of higher field as its energy increases, allowing for very rapid acceleration without the difficulties found in very rapid-cycling synchrotrons.

== List of neutrino accelerators ==
- NuMI at Fermilab
- MINOS and MINOS+ at Fermilab

== See also ==
- B-factory
- Higgs Factory
- Neutrino
- Deep Underground Neutrino Experiment
- Neutrino oscillation
- Neutrino detector
