= Muon collider =

Particle accelerator

A Muon Collider is a proposed particle accelerator facility in its conceptual design stage that collides muon beams for precision studies of the Standard Model and for direct searches of new physics. Muons belong to the second generation of leptons; they are typically produced in high-energy collisions either naturally (for example by collisions of cosmic rays with the Earth's atmosphere) or artificially (in controlled environments using particle accelerators). The main challenge of such a collider is the short lifetime of muons.

== History ==
Previous lepton colliders have all used electrons and/or their anti-particles, positrons. They offer an advantage over hadron colliders, such as the CERN-based Large Hadron Collider, in that lepton collisions are relatively "clean" thanks to leptons being elementary particles, while hadrons, such as protons, are composite particles. Yet electron-positron colliders cannot efficiently reach the same centre-of-mass energy as hadron colliders in circular accelerators due to their energy loss through synchrotron radiation.

A muon is about 206 times more massive than the electron, which reduces the amount of synchrotron radiation from a muon by a factor of about 1 billion. The reduced radiation loss enables the construction of circular colliders with much higher design energies than equivalent electron-positron colliders. This provides the unique combination of high centre-of-mass energy and clean collision environment that is not achievable in any other type of particle collider. It has been shown that a muon collider could achieve energies of several teraelectronvolt (TeV). In particular, starting from the centre-of-mass energy of 3 TeV, a muon collider is the most energy-efficient type of collider, while at 10 TeV it would have a physics reach comparable to that of the proposed 100 TeV hadron collider, FCC-hh, while fitting in a ring of the size of the LHC (27 kilometres (17 mi)), without the need for a much-more-expensive 100-kilometre-long (62 mi) long tunnel foreseen for the Future Circular Collider. A muon collider also provides a clean and effective way to produce Higgs bosons.

Muons are short-lived particles with a lifetime of 2.2 μs in their rest frame. This fact poses a serious challenge for the accelerator complex: muons must be accelerated to a high energy before they decay, and the accelerator needs a continuous source of new muons. It also impacts the experiment design: a high flux of particles induced by the muon decay products eventually reaches the detector, requiring advanced detector technologies and event-reconstruction algorithms to distinguish these particles from collision products. The baseline muon-production method considered today is based on a high-energy proton beam impinging on a target to produce pions, which then decay to muons that have a sizeable spread of direction and energy, which needs to be reduced for further acceleration in the ring. The possibility of performing this so-called 6D cooling of muons has been demonstrated by the Muon Ionisation Cooling Experiment (MICE). An alternative production method, Low Emittance Muon Accelerator (LEMMA), uses a positron beam impinging on a fixed target to produce muon pairs from the electron-positron annihilation process at the threshold centre-of-mass energy. The resulting beam does not need the cooling stage, but suffers from a very low muon-production cross section, making it challenging to achieve high luminosity with existing positron sources.

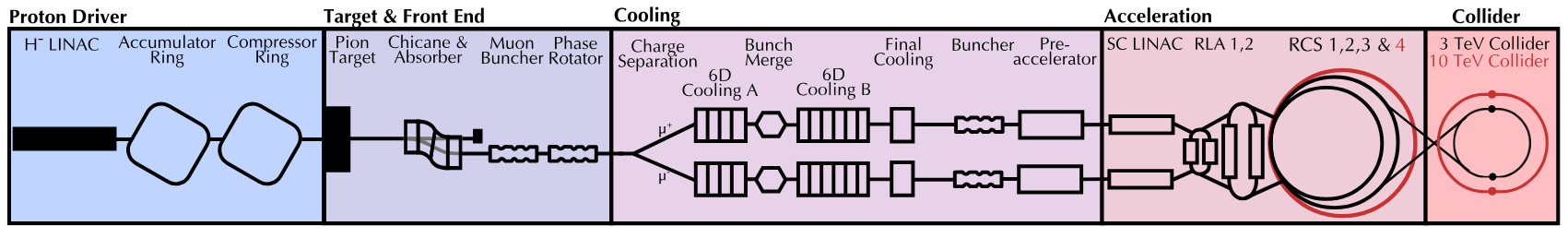
Muon collider accelerator complex conceptual layout published in 2025.

Talks were proceeding in 2009. The first dedicated design of the accelerator complex and detector design for the centre-of-mass energies up to 3 TeV was developed within the American Muon Accelerator Program (MAP) during 2010–2015, after which it was abandoned. Interest in the Muon Collider project has increased again in 2020 after the publication of the physics-reach comparison between the 1.5 TeV Muon Collider and the Compact Linear Collider (CLIC) experiment, followed by the update of the European strategy for particle physics, in which it was recommended to initiate an international design study of a Muon Collider targeting centre-of-mass energies close to 10 TeV.

== Muon acceleration ==
Researchers at the Japan Proton Accelerator Research Complex (J-PARC) developed a technique to cool and accelerate positive muons for use in future muon colliders and precision experiments. In 2024, they demonstrated the acceleration of cooled positive muons for the first time, accelerating them to approximately 4% of the speed of light. The process involved directing positive muons into a silica aerogel, where they formed muonium atoms consisting of a positive muon and an electron. An ultraviolet laser stripped the electrons from the muonium, producing positive muons in an almost stationary state. The cooled muons were then accelerated using a radio-frequency (RF) accelerating cavity.

In 2026, J-PARC demonstrated a substantial improvement in the intensity and acceleration of the cooled positive-muon beam. Researchers cooled positive muons from an initial kinetic energy of about 4 MeV to just 25 meV, reducing their kinetic energy by a factor of approximately 160 million, before accelerating them to 0.3 MeV, corresponding to about 8% of the speed of light. The accelerated-muon intensity was approximately 200 times higher than in the 2024 demonstration. J-PARC planned to increase the acceleration energy to 4 MeV, or approximately 30% of the speed of light, around 2027–28. Its longer-term goal was to accelerate the muons to energies above 200 MeV, corresponding to more than 90% of the speed of light. These developments represented an important step toward developing practical high-energy muon beams and, ultimately, muon colliders.

== See also ==
- International Muon Ionization Cooling Experiment
- Neutrino Factory
