= International Muon Ionization Cooling Experiment =

Particle physics project

The International Muon Ionization Cooling Experiment (or MICE) is a high-energy physics experiment at the Rutherford Appleton Laboratory. The experiment is a recognized CERN experiment (RE11). MICE is designed to demonstrate ionization cooling of muons. This is a process whereby the emittance of a beam is reduced in order to reduce the beam size, so that more muons can be accelerated in smaller-aperture accelerators and with fewer focussing magnets. This might enable the construction of high-intensity muon accelerators, which can be used in, for example, a neutrino factory or muon collider.

MICE will reduce the transverse emittance of a muon beam over a single 7-meter cooling cell and measure that reduction. The original MICE design was based on a scheme outlined in Feasibility Study II. It was revised significantly in 2014. Pions will be produced from a target in the ISIS neutron source and transported along a beamline where most will decay to muons before entering MICE. Cooling is tested with lithium hydride (LiH) crystals or liquid hydrogen (LH_{2}) cells; magnets are used to focus and analyze the muon beam. MICE will measure cooling performance over a range of beam momenta between about 150 and 250 MeV/c.

== Beamline ==
The MICE muon beamline provides a low-intensity muon beam for MICE. Pions will be transported from a target dipping into the fringe of the ISIS proton beam, through a pion decay channel, into a muon transport line, and then into MICE. For efficient use of muons, it is desirable to have a reasonably good match between the transport beamline and the cooling channel, with selection performed in analysis. Also, the beamline must suppress non-muon events from entering the cooling channel. A beam rate of a few hundred muons per second is expected.

== Experiment setup ==
MICE combines systems to identify, track, steer, and cool muons.

To reject background from pions and electrons, Cerenkov detectors and time-of-flight detectors are the outermost components of the experiment. A calorimeter at the end distinguishes electrons from muons.

The muon emittance is measured with scintillating-fibre tracking detectors in a 4-tesla magnetic field both before and after the main cooling cell. A diffuser can be placed in front of the first tracking detector to study the cooling of muon beams with larger emittance.

The main cooling cell consists of a secondary LiH absorber, a radio frequency cavity (RF cavity), coils to focus the beam onto the central main absorber (LiH or LH_{2}), magnet coils to focus the beam leaving the main absorber, a second RF cavity, and another secondary LiH absorber.

While the secondary absorbers contribute to cooling, their main purpose is to stop electrons released in the RF cavities. The RF cavities are designed to accelerate the muons. As they cannot be synchronized with the incoming muons, some muons will be accelerated while others will be decelerated. The time of flight measurements allow a calculation of the electric field that the muons experienced in the cavities.

The baseline main absorber is a LiH disk 65 mm (2.6 in) thick. Alternatively, a 350-millimetre-long (14 in) liquid hydrogen vessel can be used.

=== Detectors ===
Muons pass through the cooling channel one-by-one. The muons' phase space coordinates will be measured by time-of-flight scintillators and scintillating fibre tracking detectors upstream and downstream of the cooling channel. Muons will be distinguished from other particles in the beam using a combination of the spectrometers and the so-called Particle Identification (PID) detectors, three time-of-flight scintillators, a Cerenkov detector, and a calorimeter.

== Status ==
As of 2017, MICE is taking data, and upgrades to a longer cooling cell are considered.
