= Sci-Tech Daresbury =

Enterprise zone in Cheshire, England

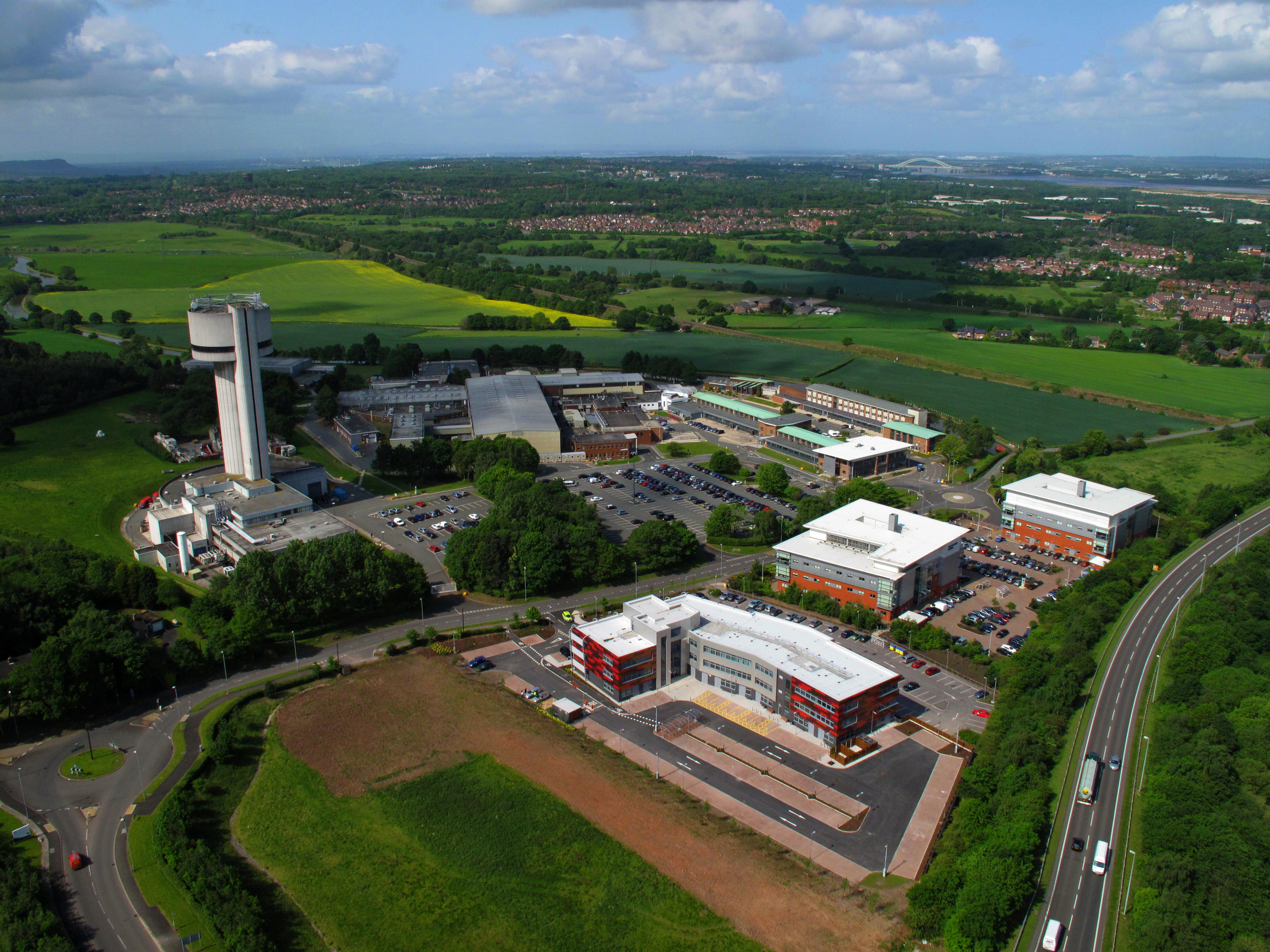
- Sci-Tech Daresbury

- Location within Cheshire
- Location: Daresbury, Cheshire
- Coordinates: 53.3430°N 2.6405°W
- Opening date: 2006
- Developer: Langtree Property Partners Ltd, Science and Technology Facilities Council and Halton Borough Council
- No. of tenants: 150
- No. of workers: 1,300
- Website: www.sci-techdaresbury.com

Sci-Tech Daresbury, also known as Sci-Tech Daresbury Enterprise Zone, is a science and innovation campus near the village of Daresbury in Halton, Cheshire, England. The site began life as the Daresbury Laboratory later forming a joint venture and adding the Cockcroft Institute, Innovation Centre, Vanguard House, Hartree Centre, Techspace One, Techspace Two, Violet, Campus Technology Hub and ITAC. Nearly 2,000 people work on the campus for over 150 high tech companies. The science park was formerly known as Daresbury Science and Innovation Campus. In 2012 it was given enterprise zone status and renamed Sci-Tech Daresbury.

== Daresbury Laboratory ==
=== Projects ===
- ALICE (accelerator), an electron accelerator previously known as ERLP (Energy Recovery Linac Prototype).
- EMMA (accelerator) an electron accelerator experiment based on the FFAG accelerator concept.

== Cockcroft Institute ==
The Cockcroft Institute is an international centre for Accelerator Science and Technology (AST) in the UK. It was proposed in September 2003 and officially opened in September 2006. It is a joint venture of Lancaster University, the University of Liverpool, the University of Manchester, the Science and Technology Facilities Council, and the Northwest Regional Development Agency. The Institute is located in a purpose-built building on the Daresbury campus, and in centres in each of the participating universities.

== Hartree Centre ==
The Hartree Centre is a high performance computing, data analytics and artificial intelligence (AI) research facility focused on industry-led challenges. It was formed in 2012 at Daresbury Laboratory on the Sci-Tech Daresbury science and innovation campus in Cheshire, UK. The Hartree Centre is part of the Science and Technology Facilities Council (STFC) which itself is part of United Kingdom Research and Innovation (UKRI).
