= Keith Symon =

American physicist (1920–2013)

Keith R. Symon
- Born: March 25, 1920
- Died: December 16, 2013 (aged 93)
- Education: Harvard University
- Scientific career
- Fields: Physics
- Workplaces: University of Wisconsin–Madison
- Thesis: Fluctuations in energy lost by high energy charged particles in the passing through matter (1948)
- Doctoral advisor: J. Curry Street

Keith Randolph Symon (March 25, 1920 – December 16, 2013) was an American physicist working in the fields of accelerator physics and plasma physics.

Symon graduated summa cum laude, Phi Beta Kappa, from Harvard in 1942 with a BA in Philosophy and Mathematics. In 1948 he was awarded a PhD in Physics. He taught physics at Wayne State University in Detroit until 1955. Symon was professor of physics at the University of Wisconsin until his retirement in 1992 when he became emeritus professor. From 1956 to 1967 he was on the staff of the Midwestern Universities Research Association (MURA), a collaboration of Big Ten universities, the University of Chicago and Notre Dame. In 1982 and 1983 he was acting director of the Madison Academic Computing Center and from 1983 to 1985, acting director of the UW-Madison Synchrotron Radiation Center. His textbook, "Mechanics", has been a staple in physics classes since publication of the first edition in 1953. It has been published in multiple languages and is still in use around the world.

Symon was awarded the Particle Accelerator and Technology Award of the IEEE Nuclear and Plasma Science Society in 2003. With four colleagues from around the country, he published "Innovation Was Not Enough -- A History of the Midwestern Universities Research Association", in 2010. He was an internationally recognized figure in plasma physics and particle accelerator design. He contributed to the work at Fermi Lab, Argonne National Laboratory (he chaired the Argonne Accelerator Users Group in the 60s), Brookhaven National Lab, labs in Los Alamos and La Jolla, and did early research for the Hadron collider at CERN in Geneva, Switzerland, where he and his family lived for a year in 1962-1963. His work took him to Europe, Japan, China, India, Russia, and Australia. He taught himself useful French, German, Dutch, Russian, and some Chinese.

He is known for the development of the FFAG accelerator concept in parallel to Tihiro Ohkawa and Andrei Kolomensky. He worked for the Midwestern Universities Research Association with Donald Kerst and received the APS Robert R. Wilson Prize in 2005.
