= 4GLS =

The 4GLS was a proposed 4th Generation Light Source, based at the Daresbury Laboratory in Cheshire, England, intended to combine energy recovery linac (ERL) and free electron laser technologies to provide synchronised sources of synchrotron radiation and free electron laser radiation covering the terahertz (THz) to soft X-ray regimes.

In early 2008 the Science and Technology Facilities Council decided not to proceed with the 4GLS.

== See also ==
- Diamond Light Source
