= Midwestern Universities Research Association =

The Midwestern Universities Research Association (MURA) was a consortium of 15 universities formed to design and build a particle accelerator in the Midwestern United States. Active from 1953 to 1967, the association ultimately did not achieve its goal and lost funding. It is believed that President John F. Kennedy would have supported the MURA project, whereas one of President Lyndon B. Johnson’s first actions was to shut down the MURA machine and laboratory.

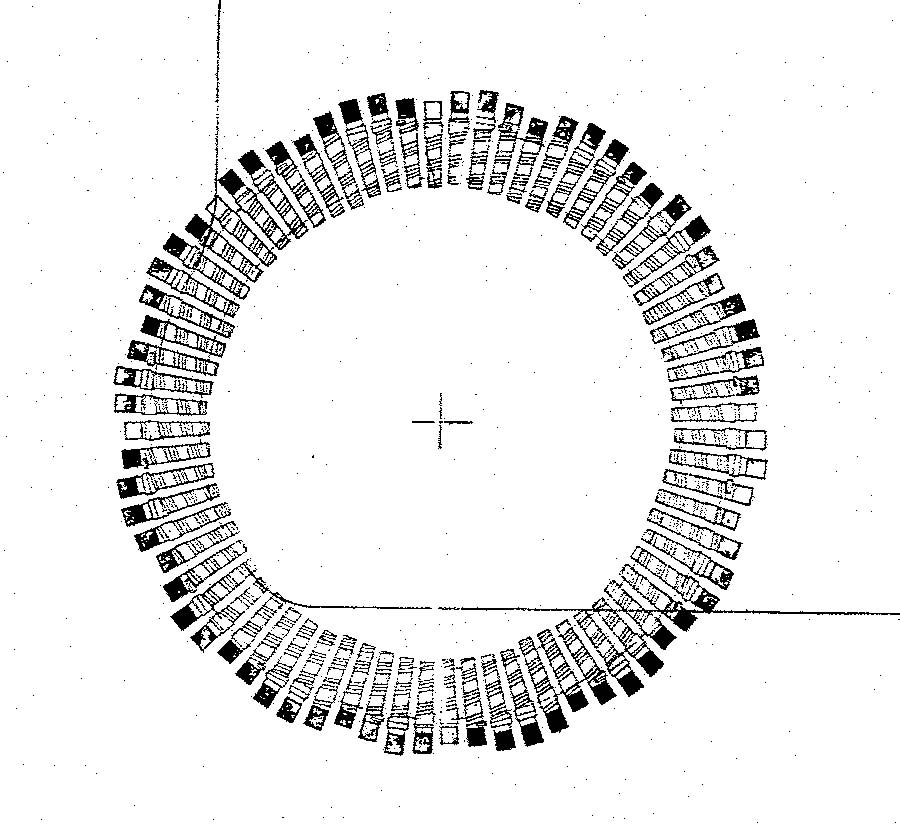
Layout of the MURA FFAG accelerator

In its early years, Donald Kerst served as director of MURA. At the institution, Keith Symon independently invented the FFAG accelerator, alongside Tihiro Ohkawa. This design combined principles from both cyclotrons and synchrotrons. FFAG concepts were extensively developed at MURA. The proposed accelerators were scaling FFAG synchrotrons, meaning that particle orbits at different momenta were geometrically similar—essentially scaled versions of each other.

The concept of FFAG acceleration was revived in the early 1980s and continues to attract interest today—for example, in projects such as EMMA (accelerator).
