= Or Hen =

Israeli nuclear physicist

- Education: Hebrew University of Jerusalem (BSc); Tel Aviv University (PhD)
- Known for: Short-range correlations in nuclei; EMC effect
- Awards: Fellow of the American Physical Society (2022); Sloan Research Fellowship (2020); DOE Early Career Award (2019); IUPAP Young Scientist Prize (2019)
- Scientific career
- Fields: Nuclear physics
- Workplaces: Massachusetts Institute of Technology
- Website: hen-lab.com

Or Hen is an experimental nuclear physicist and associate professor of physics at the Massachusetts Institute of Technology (MIT). He serves as Associate Director for Research and Development of MIT's Laboratory for Nuclear Science and was a co-founder of the ePIC collaboration, which is developing the first detector for the United States Electron–Ion Collider.

Hen's research investigates how protons and neutrons behave inside atomic nuclei and how the strong interaction modifies quark–gluon structure in the nuclear medium, combining high-energy electron scattering experiments with phenomenological analyses that connect nuclear structure to quantum chromodynamics (QCD).

Hen was elected a Fellow of the American Physical Society in 2022. In 2024, a Physical Review Letters publication on modified quark–gluon distributions in nuclei that he co-authored was named one of Physics World's "Top 10 Breakthroughs of the Year".

== Early life and education ==
Hen grew up in the moshav Even Sapir, near Jerusalem, where his family worked as farmers raising chickens. He was diagnosed with dysgraphia as a child and struggled in school until an assessment allowed him to take exams orally. During his last two years of high school he took part in an outreach program at the Hebrew University of Jerusalem, enrolling in university programming courses.

Hen received undergraduate degrees in physics and computer engineering from the Hebrew University. He then served for seven years in the Israel Defense Forces as a researcher in a physics laboratory, while concurrently pursuing a PhD in experimental physics at Tel Aviv University, conducting thesis research on short-range correlations at the Thomas Jefferson National Accelerator Facility (Jefferson Lab) in the United States. His doctoral thesis received the 2016 Jefferson Science Associates Thesis Prize.

== Career ==
Hen joined MIT as a Pappalardo Fellow in Physics in 2015 and became a member of the physics faculty in July 2017. He was named the Class of 1956 Career Development Assistant Professor of Physics in 2021 and was promoted to tenured associate professor in 2023. He serves as Associate Director for Research and Development of MIT's Laboratory for Nuclear Science.

== Research ==
=== Short-range correlations ===
Hen's research has focused on short-range correlations (SRCs) in atomic nuclei, studied using high-energy electron scattering. Experimental results from collaborations including Hen have shown that high-momentum nucleons are predominantly found in neutron–proton correlated pairs. Further measurements probed the repulsive core of the strong nuclear force at short distances, and examined implications of SRCs for low-energy nuclear structure, high-density nuclear matter, and high-energy quark distributions.

=== EMC effect ===
Hen has led studies linking short-range correlations to the EMC effect, which describes the modification of quark distributions in bound nucleons. A collaborative study reported modifications of proton and neutron structure within correlated pairs, which was used to determine the free neutron structure function and thereby constrain SU(6) symmetry-breaking mechanisms in QCD.

In 2024, a Physical Review Letters article co-authored by Hen reported evidence for universally modified quark–gluon distributions associated with correlated nucleon pairs. The result was recognized by Physics World as one of the top ten physics breakthroughs of 2024.

=== Electron–Ion Collider ===
Hen has held leadership roles in the development of the US Electron–Ion Collider (EIC) at Brookhaven National Laboratory. Following contributions to the EIC "Yellow Report" on science requirements and detector concepts, Hen co-led, together with Tanja Horn and John Lajoie, the EIC Comprehensive Chromodynamics Experiment (ECCE) consortium, which produced the reference design selected for the first EIC detector. He subsequently co-founded the ePIC collaboration, which is realizing the first EIC detector, as a member of its formation steering committee. In 2023, Hen was elected to the chair line of the international EIC User Group, serving as chair-elect for 2023–2024.

=== Neutrino interactions ===
Hen has contributed to measurements of lepton–nucleus interactions relevant to precision neutrino oscillation experiments, co-founding the "electrons-for-neutrinos" effort, which uses electron-scattering data to benchmark models of neutrino–nucleus interactions. He also contributed to measurements of neutrino–argon scattering cross sections with the MicroBooNE experiment at Fermilab.

== Honours and awards ==
- Fellow of the American Physical Society (2022)
- Alfred P. Sloan Research Fellowship (2020)
- APS Stuart J. Freedman Award in Experimental Nuclear Physics (2019)
- IUPAP Young Scientist Prize in Nuclear Physics (2019)
- Jefferson Science Associates Thesis Prize (2016)

== Selected publications ==
- Hen, O.; Miller, G. A.; Piasetzky, E.; Weinstein, L. B. (2017). "Nucleon-nucleon correlations, short-lived excitations, and the quarks within". Reviews of Modern Physics. 89 (4) 045002. arXiv:1611.09748. doi:10.1103/RevModPhys.89.045002.
- Schmookler, B.; Duer, M.; Schmidt, A.; et al. (2019). "Modified structure of protons and neutrons in correlated pairs". Nature. 566: 354–358. arXiv:2004.12065. doi:10.1038/s41586-019-0925-9.
- Denniston, A. W.; Ježo, T.; Kusina, A.; et al. (2024). "Evidence for Modified Quark-Gluon Distributions in Nuclei by Correlated Nucleon Pairs". Physical Review Letters. 133 (15) 152502. doi:10.1103/PhysRevLett.133.152502.
