= Swapan Chattopadhyay =

Indian physicist

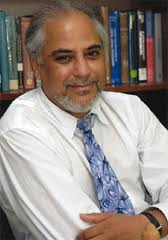
- Born: 26 December 1951 (age 74); Calcutta, West Bengal, India
- Citizenship: United States
- Education: University of Calcutta (BSc); IIT Kharagpur (MSc); University of California, Berkeley (MS, PhD)
- Spouse: Janet Chaterji
- Children: 2
- Scientific career
- Fields: Physics
- Workplaces: SLAC and Stanford University (2021–); Northern Illinois University and Fermi National Accelerator Laboratory (2014–); Cockcroft Institute (2007–2014); Universities of Liverpool, Manchester and Lancaster, UK (2007–2014); Thomas Jefferson National Accelerator Facility (2001–2007); University of California at Berkeley (1974–1982, 1984–2001, 2009–2011, 2013–2015, 2023–); Lawrence Berkeley National Laboratory (1976–1982, 1984–2001); CERN (1982–1984, 2008–)
- Thesis: On stochastic cooling of bunched beams from fluctuation and kinetic theory
- Doctoral advisors: Joseph J. Bisognano
- Other academic advisors: Prof. Wulf Kunkel; Prof. Owen Chamberlain

Signature
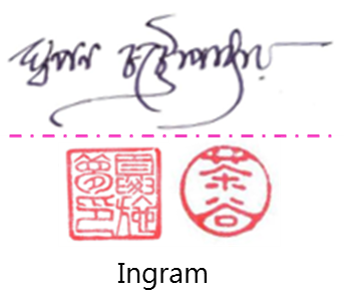

Swapan Chattopadhyay (born 26 December 1951) is an Indian American physicist who received his PhD from the University of California (Berkeley) in 1982.

Chattopadhyay is part-time Faculty at University of California at Berkeley, adjunct professor of photon science at SLAC, Stanford University, and emeritus president's professor at Northern Illinois University (NIU) and distinguished scientist emeritus at Fermi National Accelerator Laboratory (Fermilab), where he was a member of the director's senior leadership team and was director of the Cooperative Research and Development Agreement between Fermilab and NIU.

Chattopadhyay is a Fellow of the American Physical Society, American Association for the Advancement of Science, Institute of Physics (UK), Royal Society of Arts, Manufactures and Commerce (UK) and Corresponding Fellow of the Royal Society of Edinburgh and a member of many international panels and committees, including the "International Committee for Future Accelerators" and the DESY Science Council (2008–2013).

== Early life and education ==
=== Early childhood ===
Swapan Chattopadhyay was born in Calcutta, India, and spent his early childhood years in the Himalayan hill town of Darjeeling. His family moved to Calcutta in the early 1960s, where he went to high school and college.

=== Higher education and early career ===
Chattopadhyay completed his B.Sc. degree from Calcutta University in 1970 in physics. He continued his studies at the Indian Institute of Technology at Kharagpur, for his post-graduate studies, completing his M.Sc. degree with specialization in Particle Physics in 1972.

Chattopadhyay then joined in 1972 the Physics department of the University of Oregon. However, over time, the draw towards the University of California at Berkeley got stronger and he joined the University of California at Berkeley in 1974, as a Ph.D. student in the Department of Physics. After flirting for two years (1974–1976) with the inimitable Berkeley brand of theoretical particle physics, then known as the "S-matrix" and "Bootstrap" theories of "strong interactions", under tutelage of Prof. Geoffrey Chew, Chattopadhyay was attracted away by accelerator physics dealing with charged particle and light beams. After having completed his PhD, he moved to CERN as an "attaché scientifique" in the Super Proton-Antiproton Synchrotron, contributing to program of stochastic cooling of antiproton beams.

== Career ==
Chattopadhyay is noted for his pioneering contributions of innovative concepts, techniques and developments in high energy particle colliders, coherent and incoherent light sources, ultrafast sciences in the femto- and atto- second regimes, superconducting linear accelerators and various applications of interaction of particle and light beams. He has directly contributed to the development of many accelerators around the world, e.g. the Super Proton-Antiproton Synchrotron at CERN, the Advanced Light Source at Berkeley, the asymmetric-energy electron-positron collider PEP-II at Stanford, the Continuous Electron Beam Accelerator facility (CEBAF) at Jefferson Lab and the Free-Electron Lasers at Jefferson and Daresbury Laboratories.

He was formerly the Sir John Cockcroft Chair of Physics jointly at the Universities of Liverpool, Manchester and Lancaster—the First Chair of accelerator physics in UK, named after the British Nobel Laureate credited with creating the field. In this role he was the Inaugural Director of the Cockcroft Institute (UK), having been appointed in April 2007. Prior to this he served as associate director of Thomas Jefferson National Accelerator Facility (2001–2007), staff/senior scientist and founding director of the Centre for Beam Physics at Lawrence Berkeley National Laboratory (1984–2001); and scientific attaché at CERN (1982–1984).

After the period spent at CERN, Chattopadhyay returned to Lawrence Berkeley National Laboratory in 1984, where he led and defined the accelerator physics of the Advanced Light Source (ALS) and contributed to the conceptual design of the Superconducting Super Collider (SSC), pioneered the accelerator physics which underpinned the Berkeley-Stanford asymmetric B-factory (PEP-II) for CP-violation studies, and initiated the Berkeley FEL/Femtosecond X-ray Source and Laser-Plasma Acceleration development. He was a senior scientist, a guest professor, and the founder/director of the Center for Beam Physics at Berkeley, until his move to Thomas Jefferson National Accelerator Facility in 2001 as the associate laboratory director for accelerators. At Thomas Jefferson National Accelerator Facility, he made critical advancements in microwave superconducting linear accelerators leading the way to current and future grand instruments of science such as the high precision CEBAF and its 12 GeV upgrade for precision research in hadronic physics, Spallation Neutron Source at Oak Ridge National Laboratory, USA to advance neutron sciences and novel materials research, and the current superconducting version of the International Linear Collider, to name a few. His research at the Cockcroft Institute in UK included development of sources of "ultra-cold" relativistic free electron beams to advance coherent electron diffraction techniques; production of novel coherent and ultra-short pulses of photons (e.g. x-ray FELs); novel acceleration methods; investigation of photonic crystals and metamaterial structures for charged particle acceleration; novel high energy colliders.

While working for Fermilab and Northern Illinois University he contributed to cavity searches for dark matter; investigation of ultra-light dark matter and dark energy via atom interferometry, and the creation of the Matter-wave Atomic Gradiometer Interferometric Sensor (MAGIS-100) experiment. Having contributed to the conception, design, construction, commissioning and operation of numerous accelerators for particle and nuclear physics, photon and neutron sciences around the world, with significant research accomplishments in advanced particle and photon beam physics, and mentoring scientists around the world, in the developing nations in particular, in accelerator developments as a unifying global force among nations, Swapan Chattopadhyay is a frequently invited speaker and advisor at professional societies and government research agencies, serving on numerous editorial, advisory and review committees throughout the world.

He served as the Vice-Chair, Chair-elect, Chair and Past-Chair of the American Physical Society's Division of Physics of Beams (2007–2011). Chattopadhyay has delivered lectures throughout the world e.g. Saha Memorial Lecture, Homi Bhabha Lecture, Raja Ramanna Memorial Lecture, and Cavendish Lecture among many.
