= Hartree Centre =

Research facility at Daresbury Laboratory

Coordinates: 53.342°N 2.640°W

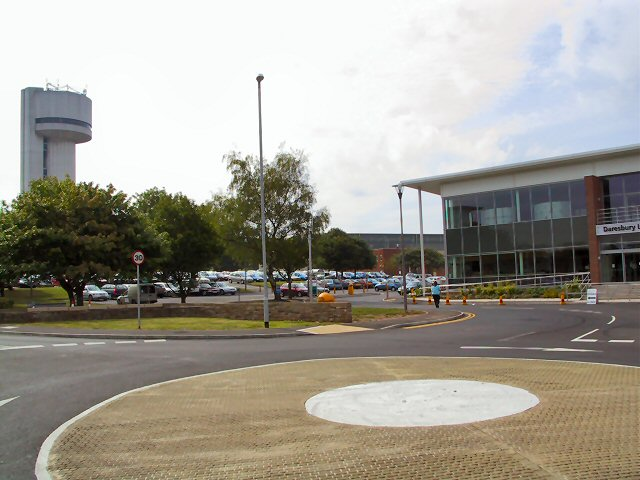
- Established: 2012
- Field of research: High performance computing, data analytics, artificial intelligence, quantum computing
- Director: Professor Katherine Royse
- Location: Sci-Tech Daresbury, Daresbury, WA4 4AD, United Kingdom
- Operating agency: Science and Technology Facilities Council
- Website: www.hartree.stfc.ac.uk

The Hartree Centre is a high performance computing, data analytics and artificial intelligence (AI) research facility at Daresbury Laboratory on the Sci-Tech Daresbury science and innovation campus in Cheshire, United Kingdom. Established in 2012, it is part of the Science and Technology Facilities Council (STFC) within United Kingdom Research and Innovation (UKRI), and is described by STFC as the UK's only supercomputing centre with a remit focused on industry engagement.

== Background ==
The Hartree Centre is named after the English mathematician and physicist Douglas Rayner Hartree, a pioneer of numerical analysis and early electronic computing. It was established in 2012 with £37.5 million of UK government funding, with a remit to provide UK industry and academia with access to high-performance computing, expertise and training, alongside research interests in energy-efficient computing and big data.

In 2014 the centre received a further £19 million for research into energy-efficient computing and the kinds of large datasets associated with facilities such as the Square Kilometre Array, and the 2014 Autumn Statement allocated a further £115 million over five years for work in cognitive computing and big data analytics. The investment formed part of the Northern Powerhouse strategy for the North of England. By the financial year ending 31 March 2018 the centre's cumulative funding had reached £115.5 million.

The centre became an Intel Parallel Computing Centre in 2014, and hosts both an IBM Research team and the University of Liverpool Virtual Engineering Centre.

In June 2021, Science Minister Amanda Solloway announced the Hartree National Centre for Digital Innovation (HNCDI), a five-year programme to give UK businesses and the public sector access to AI, quantum computing and supercomputing. The programme was valued at £210 million, comprising £172 million from UKRI and an in-kind contribution from IBM stated at £38 million. The HNCDI was projected to create around 60 additional scientific posts.

Construction of a £30 million supercomputing centre building at Daresbury Laboratory began with a ceremony in February 2023. In March 2024 the centre published its 2024–2029 strategy and signed an agreement with Lenovo for a direct-water-cooled successor to its Scafell Pike system. The new system, named Mary Coombs after Mary Coombs, the UK's first female commercial programmer, was launched within the new building in October 2025. It is a GPU-based machine intended primarily for AI workloads and advanced visualisation, with a peak performance reported at 24.41 petaflops. As of 2025, the centre reports more than 160 staff working across supercomputing, applied scientific computing, data science, AI, cloud and quantum computing.

== Systems ==
The Hartree Centre's primary system as of 2025 is Mary Coombs, a Lenovo ThinkSystem Neptune GPU cluster which uses direct warm-water cooling. Other systems hosted at the centre include:

- Scafell Pike, a Bull Sequana X1000 with Intel Skylake CPUs and Intel Xeon Phi accelerators, installed in 2017 as the first Bull Sequana X1000 in the UK.
- Lenovo NeXtScale and Lenovo System x iDataPlex clusters.
- JADE and JADE2, Atos Bull systems built around Nvidia DGX-1 and DGX-1 Max-Q nodes, hosting the JADE national deep learning service.
- Two Atos Quantum Learning Machine quantum simulators, the first installed in 2019 and a second in 2023.
- IBM POWER8 systems with NVLink and Tesla P100 or Nvidia K80 accelerators.
- A Visual Computing Centre and a large-scale GPFS storage system.

Through the EU-funded VINEYARD project the centre has also provided researchers with access to experimental hardware including a Maxeler FPGA system and an ARM v8 64-bit platform.

=== Former systems ===
From 2012 to 2016 the centre hosted Blue Joule, an IBM Blue Gene/Q. In the June 2012 TOP500 list it was ranked the most powerful non-distributed computing system in the UK and 13th in the world. In 2016, Blue Joule was repurposed for the DiRAC facility at the Institute for Computational Cosmology, Durham University.

== Research areas ==
=== Energy-efficient computing ===
Energy efficiency has been a research focus at the Hartree Centre since its founding, motivated by sustainability considerations and by the power constraints associated with moving high-performance computing towards exascale. In 2015, Lenovo entered into a partnership with the centre to develop energy-efficient computing solutions using an ARM-based server prototype. The Mary Coombs system uses direct warm-water cooling, which Lenovo states reduces electricity demand relative to comparable air-cooled designs.

=== Quantum computing ===
The centre's quantum activities expanded under the HNCDI from 2021 onwards, with a strategy of working with multiple hardware partners. Its two Atos Quantum Learning Machine simulators are used to develop quantum algorithms in a hardware-agnostic manner.

In October 2023, PsiQuantum announced a 12-month collaboration with the Hartree Centre, supported by the UK's National Security Strategic Investment Fund, to work on fault-tolerant quantum computing applications. The partnership was announced alongside the opening of PsiDaresbury, a joint STFC–PsiQuantum R&D facility at Daresbury Laboratory. The centre has separately worked with IBM, Pasqal and a group at Rensselaer Polytechnic Institute on a Quantum Resource Management Interface, an open-source tool providing unified job submission across quantum and classical computing resources in cloud environments.

=== Artificial intelligence and generative models ===
Artificial intelligence is a central research theme of the HNCDI programme with IBM. According to a 2024–2025 progress report compiled by Technopolis, the HNCDI had by that point supported 179 collaborative R&D projects with 80 partner organisations and produced over 50 peer-reviewed publications, and the programme received the IEEE Quantum Technical Community Synergy Award.

From 2023 onwards the centre expanded its work on foundation models and generative AI, including large language models (LLMs), image diffusion models and generative adversarial networks. The centre has stated that when developing LLMs it generally works with a partner organisation's own datasets, providing data processing and curation alongside model training. Reported projects in this area include:

- A geospatial foundation model developed with IBM and tailored to UK landscape data, building on earlier IBM geospatial models trained on optical imagery alone by adding synthetic aperture radar (SAR) data to enable detection of events such as flooding under cloud cover.
- A collaboration with the SME Collaborative Conveyancing on an encoder-only generative model for categorising emails and drafting responses in residential conveyancing.
- Work with the firm SimplyDo, through the Hartree Centre Cardiff Hub at Cardiff University, on the application of LLMs to data-sensitive workloads in enterprise innovation platforms.
- A partnership with the firm Photocert announced in August 2025 to develop AI-based image and document authentication tools for sectors including insurance, fintech and asset finance, in response to the use of generative AI in image manipulation and fraud.
- A February 2026 agreement with IBM and the UK Atomic Energy Authority (UKAEA) to apply generative AI to the design of future experimental fusion power plants, drawing on data from UKAEA's JET and MAST Upgrade machines.

The centre operates the EXPLAIN training stream of HNCDI, which provides self-paced and instructor-led courses on topics including generative AI, machine learning, and the deployment of open-source language models as cloud-hosted applications.

=== SME engagement and BridgeAI ===
In 2023 the Hartree Centre established three regional SME Engagement Hubs hosted by Cardiff University, Newcastle University and Ulster University, funded with a combined £4.5 million over three years to provide locally-accessible digital adoption support.

The centre is a delivery partner in Innovate UK's £100 million BridgeAI programme, launched in 2023, alongside Digital Catapult, the Alan Turing Institute, BSI and Innovate UK Business Connect. BridgeAI aims to accelerate AI adoption in agriculture, construction, the creative industries and transport. Under the programme the Hartree Centre has issued innovation vouchers and HPC vouchers and provided direct technical support to SMEs; documented projects include work with the consultancy Turley on text extraction for environmental impact assessments, NASH Maritime on watercraft tracking for river safety, and Box O Fun on glaze formulation for ceramicists.

== Work with industry ==
The Hartree Centre collaborates with academic researchers and industry partners across software development and optimisation, big-data analytics, collaborative R&D and training. Long-running industrial partners include Unilever, Rolls-Royce and the Met Office, and the centre works with the UK Atomic Energy Authority on a centre of excellence in extreme-scale computing for fusion energy research at Daresbury Laboratory.

=== Selected projects ===
- From 2013 the Hartree Centre established a long-term partnership with Unilever on computer-aided formulation tools. One resulting application allowed certain product-formulation tasks that the partners reported had previously taken about a week to be performed in around 40 minutes.
- In 2014, the centre ran a competition in partnership with the Open Data Institute and IBM for commercial applications of open data. One winner, the UK SME Democrata, used the centre's machines together with IBM Watson components and Hadoop repositories to build a tool that mapped archaeological, geological and land-use data for use in risk assessment of construction projects near sites of historical significance.
- In June 2015, Minister for Universities and Science Jo Johnson announced a renewed Hartree–IBM partnership which gave the centre access to IBM data-centric and cognitive-computing technology, including IBM Watson; the value of the access was reported at around £200 million.
- In May 2016, the centre announced a collaboration with Alder Hey Children's Hospital which the partners described as creating the UK's first "cognitive hospital", using IBM Watson to support patient experience. The project received the "Most Innovative Collaboration" award at the 2017 North West Coast Research and Innovation Awards, and the associated Alder Play app, which included an Ask Oli chatbot, was released in December 2017.
- From 2016 to 2019 the centre was one of five partners in the LCR 4.0 project, which provided technical support to SMEs adopting Industry 4.0 technologies in the Liverpool City Region.
