= John Dainton =

British physicist

John Bourke Dainton FRS is a British physicist, and Sir James Chadwick Professor of Physics, at University of Liverpool. Dainton was awarded the Max Born Prize in 1999.

His father was Frederick Dainton, Baron Dainton. He was the founding director of the Cockcroft Institute.

He was elected a Fellow of the Royal Society in 2002 and in 2018 he became Editor-in-Chief of the Royal Society journal, Philosophical Transactions of the Royal Society A.
