= LHeC =

Accelerator study for a possible upgrade of the existing LHC storage ring

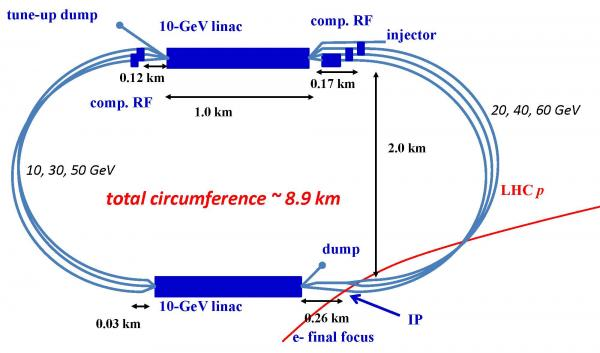
Current default layout of the LHeC recirculating linear electron accelerator complex. Collisions with the proton beam happen at the interaction point (IP).

The Large Hadron Electron Collider (LHeC) is a conceptual particle accelerator facility that has been studied for a possible upgrade of the existing Large Hadron Collider storage ring operating at CERN in Geneva, Switzerland. By adding a new electron accelerator adjacent to the existing LHC proton accelerator and storage ring, the LHeC would enable the investigation of electron-proton and electron-ion collisions at much higher energies and rates than had been possible at the electron-proton collider HERA at DESY in Hamburg, Germany, which terminated its operation in 2007. These capabilities of the LHeC could provide a unique program of particle physics research, studying the substructure of the proton and nuclei, or the physics of the Higgs boson.

== Design Concept ==
The baseline design of the LHeC consists in two superconducting linear particle accelerators ("linacs") each about 1 km long, arranged in a racetrack configuration tangential to the LHC. Each linac provides about 10 GeV acceleration, therefore the electrons makes three turns in the racetrack reaching an energy of about 60 GeV before colliding with the 7 TeV protons or 2.7 TeV lead ions. A unique feature of the design is the optimization for a particularly low power consumption, which would be achieved by decelerating the electron beam after the collision and gaining back nearly all its energy into the radio-frequency cavities of the linacs, a principle termed "energy recovery". Currently, preparations of an international collaboration with CERN are ongoing for developing superconducting accelerator cavities, at the appropriate frequency of 802 MHz. In parallel a design study for an energy recovery linac test platform is being pursued at CERN. Related to the proton and heavy-ion physics of the LHC, the physics program and a detector for the LHeC are also under study. For maximum use of the operation time and resources of the LHC complex at CERN it is envisaged that electron-proton and proton-proton data are taken simultaneously. The LHeC electron beam may be combined with a multi-10-TeV proton beam in the far future, which has been under consideration in a worldwide study at CERN since 2013.

LHeC would be an electron–ion collider, similar to other systems planned at other particle physics laboratories, although the present design would not include polarized protons.
