= ALICE (accelerator) =

Particle accelerator at Daresbury Laboratory

Coordinates: 53°20′35″N 02°38′26″W

Accelerators and Lasers In Combined Experiments (ALICE), or Energy Recovery Linac Prototype (ERLP) was a 35MeV energy recovery linac test facility at Daresbury Laboratory in Cheshire, England. The project was originally conceived as a test bed for the 4th Generation Light Source (4GLS), and consisted of:

- A 350keV photoinjector laser.
- An 8.35MeV superconducting RF booster linac.
- A 35MeV superconducting RF main linac in which energy is recovered from used electron bunches and given to new bunches.
- An infrared free electron laser (FEL), using a permanent magnet undulator on permanent loan from Thomas Jefferson National Accelerator Facility (TJNAF).
- An ERL transport system that transported electron bunches through the FEL and back to the linac with the correct RF phase to decelerate them and thereby to recover energy from them.

The ALICE accelerator was an Energy Recovery Linac (ERL) that incorporated all the features of the 4th generation light source albeit at smaller scale. An ERL is not restricted by the dynamic properties of storage rings and, therefore, can attain an unprecedented electron beam brightness limited only by the electron gun. Energy recovery allows also a significant increase in an average power of the light sources (without building a dedicated power station nearby).

The ability to produce ultra-short electron bunches well below 1ps and an availability of several light sources of different "colour" open up numerous possibilities for conducting investigations of fast processes on a femtosecond scale in molecular and solid state physics to name but a few.

The ALICE project was extended by addition of a 19-cavity accelerating Non-Scaling FFAG ring, known as the EMMA project. Construction of the EMMA machine began in September 2009. On March 31, 2011, full ring circumnavigation was completed to establish proof of principle.

By May 2016, decommissioning of both EMMA and ALICE started, and in 2019 the process was completed, with most components being donated to other facilities.

== Principle ==
A DC photoelectron gun generated short low emittance electron bunches with the length of several picosecond (ps) and accelerated them to 350keV. The nominal bunch charge on ALICE was 80 picocoulomb (pC). The bunches were produced in trains lasting from ~10ns to 100ms and the train repetition frequency could vary from 1 to 20 Hz. Within the train, the bunches were separated by 12.3ns that corresponded to the laser pulse repetition frequency of 81.25 MHz.

The electron beam was then injected into the superconductive linac (booster), accelerated to the energy of 8.35MeV and transported to the main linac that increased the beam energy to 35MeV. Both superconductive linacs were cooled down to approximately 20 K with liquid helium. The accelerating phase of the main linac was chosen such that a specific energy chirp was introduced along the bunch so that it could be later compressed longitudinally in a magnetic chicane (bunch compressor). The beam reached the chicane after being turned by 180° in the first triple bend achromat ARC1.

After compression, the beam, consisting now of sub-picosecond bunches, entered the magnetic undulator that constituted a major part of the mid-IR Free Electron Laser (FEL). This laser generated IR light with the wavelength of ~5mm.

The spent electron beam was returned to the entrance of the main linac via the second ARC2 at a precise time when the RF phase was exactly opposite to the initial accelerating phase. This condition required an accurate adjustment of the electron beam path length that was accomplished by moving the ARC1 as a whole. The beam was then decelerated thus giving its energy back to the electromagnetic field inside the linac RF cavities (energy recovery) and emerged from the linac having the original energy of 8.35MeV. This energy recovered beam was diverted to the beam dump ending its short but useful life.

== Main parameters ==
-	Nominal parameters	Currently achieved
Gun DC voltage	350 kV	350 kV with nominal HV ceramic; currently gun operates at 230 kV
Nominal bunch charge	80 pC	80 pC (>~200pC can be also delivered)
Cathode	NEA GaAs	NEA GaAs
Laser Nd:YVO4(2nd harmonic)	532 nm	532 nm
Laser spot	4.1 mm FWHM	Variable
Laser pulse length	28 ps FWHM	28ps with laser pulse stacker
Quantum efficiency	1-3%	~4% (~15% in the lab conditions)
Injector energy	8.35 MeV	Currently 7.0MeV
Total beam energy	35 MeV	Currently 30 MeV
RF frequency	1.3 GHz	1.3 GHz
Bunch repetition frequency	81.25 MHz	81.25 MHz
Train length	0-100 ms	Up to 100 μs at 40 pC
Train repetition frequency	1–20 Hz	1–20 Hz
Compressed bunch length	<1ps @80pC	To be measured
Peak current in compressed bunch	150A	To be measured
Maximum average current	13 mA	-
MAX current within the train	6.5 mA	> 6.5mA but at shorter train lengths

== See also ==
- EMMA
