= Daresbury Laboratory =

Laboratory in Halton, Cheshire, England

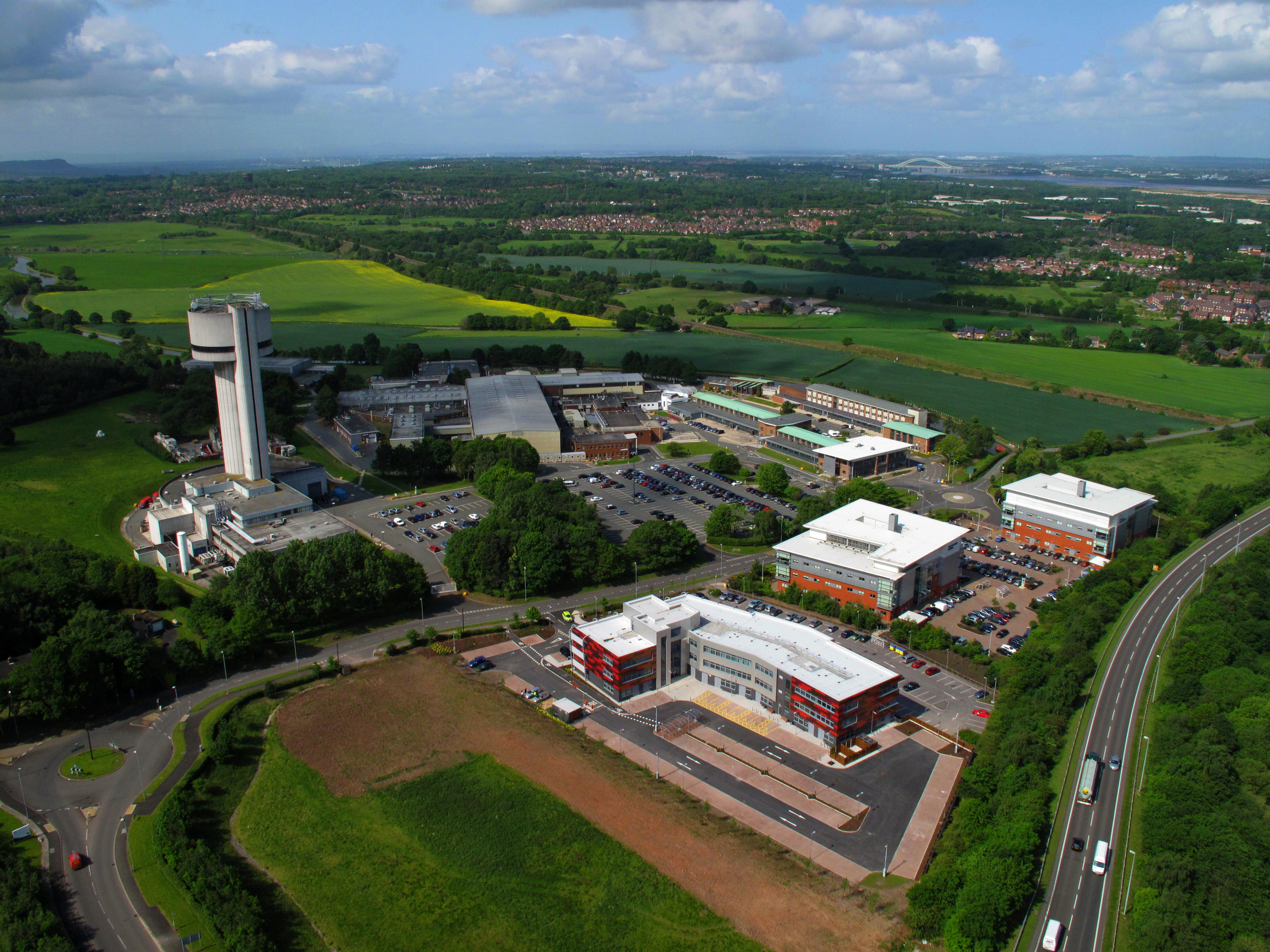
- Aerial view of Daresbury Laboratory
- Established: 1962
- Laboratory type: National scientific research laboratory
- Field of research: Applied science; Fundamental science
- Director: Paul Vernon
- Staff: 300
- Location: Daresbury, England; 53°20′35″N 2°38′26″W
- Operating agency: Science and Technology; Facilities Council
- Website: www.ukri.org/who-we-are/stfc/facilities/daresbury-laboratory/

Map
- Location within Cheshire

Daresbury Laboratory is a scientific research laboratory based at Sci-Tech Daresbury campus near Daresbury in Halton, Cheshire, England. The laboratory began operations in 1962 and was officially opened on 16 June 1967 as the Daresbury Nuclear Physics Laboratory (DNPL) by then-Prime Minister, Harold Wilson. It was the second national laboratory established by the British National Institute for Research in Nuclear Science, following the Rutherford High Energy Laboratory (now Rutherford Appleton Laboratory).

It is operated by the Science and Technology Facilities Council, part of UK Research and Innovation. As of 2018, it employed around 300 staff. Paul Vernon was appointed as director in November 2020. Daresbury Laboratory carries out research in accelerator science, bio-medicine, physics, chemistry, materials, engineering and computational science. Its facilities are also used by external scientists and engineers, both from universities and industry.

== History ==
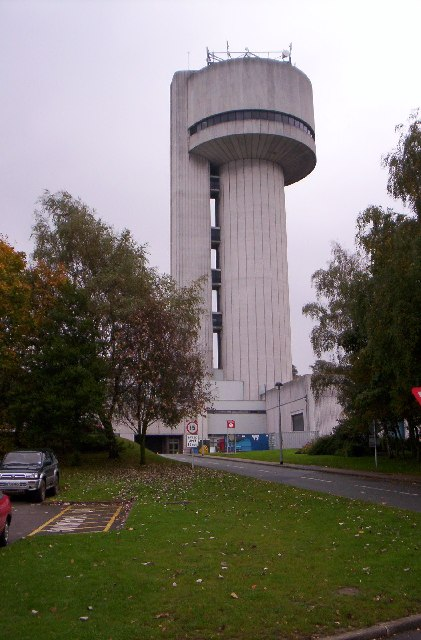
Daresbury Tower, formerly the Nuclear Structure Facility

Daresbury Laboratory was approved and funded in 1963 as the site for an electron synchrotron. Called the National Institute's Northern Accelerator (NINA), it operated between 1966 and 1977. NINA was followed by the Synchrotron Radiation Source (SRS), approved in 1974 and beginning operation in 1980. Work on the SRS contributed to two Nobel Prizes in Chemistry. The first was won in 1997 by John Walker, and the second in 2009 by Venki Ramakrishnan.

== Facilities and research ==
- Accelerator science, including the Cockcroft Institute which houses scientists from STFC, University of Manchester, University of Liverpool, University of Lancaster, and University of Strathclyde. Accelerator science facilities include:
  - VELA (Versatile Electron Linear Accelerator), an electron compact linear accelerator, based around an RF photocathode gun.
  - CLARA (Compact Linear Accelerator for Research Applications), an electron linear accelerator to be used for research in free-electron lasers.
  - FEBE (Full Energy Beam Exploitation), a beamline of CLARA designed for 2 GeV electron research.
- SuperSTEM, a national research facility for advanced electron microscopy. The facility belongs to EPSRC.
- The Hartree Centre, a high performance computing, data analytics and AI research facility.
- Scientific computing
- Nuclear physics
- Detector systems
- Superconducting Radio-Frequency Lab (SuRF Lab)
- Engineering Technology Centre
- Public engagement
- The University of Liverpool Virtual Engineering Centre
- PsiQuantum

=== Retired facilities ===
- NINA (Northern Institute's Nuclear Accelerator), an electron synchrotron; the first accelerator at the site.
- ALICE (Accelerators and Lasers In Combined Experiments), an electron accelerator previously known as ERLP (Energy Recovery Linac Prototype).
- EMMA (Electron Machine with Many Applications or Electron Model for Many Applications), a linear non-scaling FFAG accelerator.
- NSF (Nuclear Structure Facility), a tandem Van de Graaff accelerator housed in the tower.
- HPCx, a supercomputer (replaced by the UK national supercomputing service, HECToR, based in Edinburgh).
- Synchrotron Radiation Source (SRS)

== Awards ==
In 2009 the laboratory was awarded the title of the "Most Outstanding Science Park" at the UK Science Parks Association.

== See also ==
- Alec Merrison – British nuclear physicist, Daresbury Laboratory's first director
- Cockcroft Institute – Scientific research institute in Cheshire, England, International centre for accelerator science
- Diamond Light Source - UK synchrotron centre
- Van de Graaff generator – Electrostatic generator operating on the triboelectric effect, The former Nuclear Structure Facility at Daresbury was based on a Van de Graaff accelerator
- Arthur Dooley – British sculptor. The Laboratory has a piece 'Splitting of the Atom', unveiled in 1971, constructed from magnetic steel and two 37 inch pole tips taken from the cyclotron.
