= Cockcroft Institute =

Scientific research institute in Cheshire, England

Coordinates: 53°20′41″N 02°38′16″W

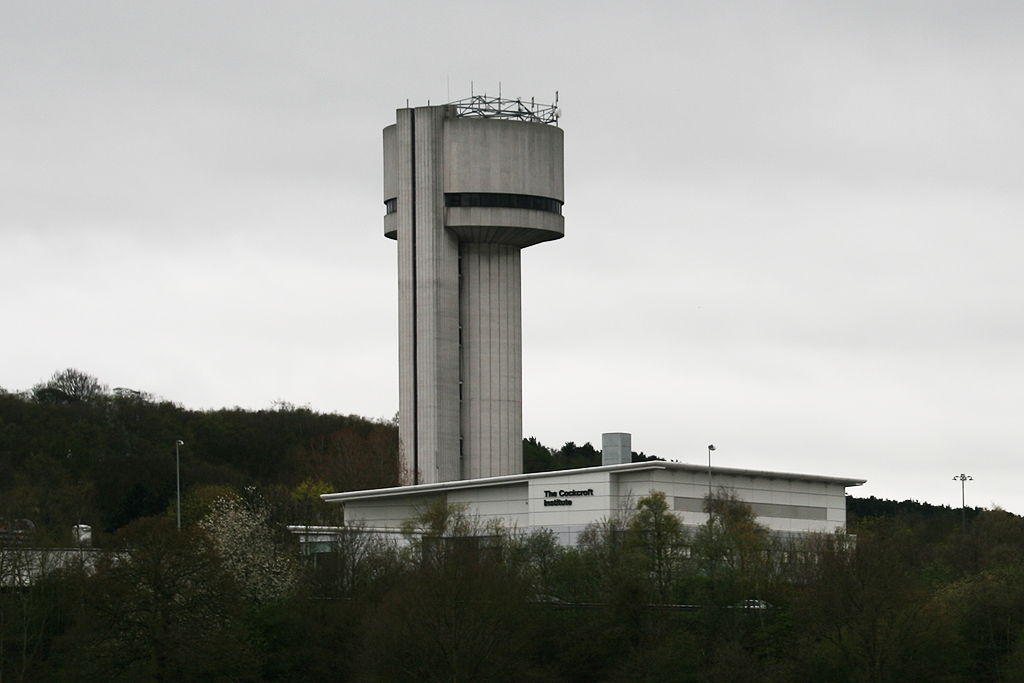
The Cockcroft Institute building in Daresbury viewed from the Bridgewater Canal.

The Cockcroft Institute is an international centre for Accelerator Science and Technology (AST) in the UK. It was proposed in September 2003 and officially opened in September 2006. It is a joint venture of Lancaster University, the University of Liverpool, the University of Manchester, the University of Strathclyde, the Science and Technology Facilities Council, and (formerly) the Northwest Regional Development Agency. The institute is located in a purpose-built building on the Sci-Tech Daresbury campus, and in centres in each of the participating universities.

The Institute's aim is to provide the intellectual focus, educational infrastructure, and the essential scientific and technological facilities for Accelerator Science and Technology research and development, which will enable UK scientists and engineers to take a major role in accelerator design, construction, and operation for the benefit of national and international science and infrastructures. The institute is named after the Nobel prizewinner Sir John Cockcroft FRS.

The present director of the Cockcroft Institute is Stewart Boogert, who replaced the previous director Peter Ratoff. Previous directors were Swapan Chattopadhyay and John Dainton.

The Institute was founded as a consortium of 3 initial university groups (at the universities of Lancaster, Liverpool and Manchester) in partnership with the STFC Accelerator Science and Technology Centre (ASTeC), with initial leadership from Mike Poole, Roger Barlow, John Dainton and others.
