= Energy recovery linac =

An energy recovery linac (ERL) is a type of linear particle accelerator that provides a beam of electrons used to produce x-rays by synchrotron radiation. First proposed in 1965 the idea gained interest since the early 2000s.

== Spectral radiance ==
The usefulness of an x-ray beam for scientific experiments depends upon the beam's spectral radiance, which tells how much power of a given wavelength is concentrated on a spot. Most scientific literature on x-ray sources uses a closely related term called brilliance, which counts the rate of photons produced, rather than their power. The energy of a photon is inversely proportional to the photon's wavelength.

Very high power is usually achieved by delivering the energy in short pulses, allowing the apparatus to work within reasonable power demands and cooling limits. Depending upon the pulse length and repetition rate, the average spectral radiance will be much lower than the peak spectral radiance. The peak spectral radiance and the average spectral radiance are both important properties of an x-ray beam. For some experiments, the peak value is most important, but for other experiments, the average value is most important.

As a synchrotron light source, the performance of an energy recovery linac falls between a storage ring and a free-electron laser (FEL). Energy recovery linacs have high repetition rates and therefore high average spectral radiance, but lower peak spectral radiance than a FEL.

== Mechanism ==
While using a recirculating charged particle beam with a magnet lattice resembling that of a storage ring, each particle travels through the recirculating arc before being decelerated in a linac structure. The same linac structure also accelerates new low-energy particles that are continuously injected into the linac. Thus, instead of recycling the particle beam continuously, while its emittance increases by synchrotron radiation emission, only its kinetic energy is recycled, enabling a low beam emittance while maintaining high repetition rates comparable to synchrotrons.

1. Charged particles (usually electrons) are injected into a linear accelerator (linac), where the particles are accelerated by a radio frequency (RF) field.
2. The beam of accelerated particles exits the linac, and passes through a series of magnets, that guides the beam back to the beginning of the linac.
3. The length of the beam path is such that the returning particles are about 180 degrees out of phase with particles being accelerated by the linac.
4. The phase difference causes the returning particles to be decelerated, while newly injected particles are accelerated. The kinetic energy of the decelerated particles increases the intensity of the RF field, which is used by the particles being accelerated.

== Energy Recovery Linacs around the world ==
=== Brookhaven National Laboratory ===
BNL-ERL is aimed at 500mA at 20MeV. It is now under commissioning at the Collider Accelerator Department at Brookhaven National Laboratory. One of the main feature of this ERL is a superconducting laser photocathode RF gun powered by a 1MW CW klystron and equipped with a load-lock system for the insertion of high quantum efficiency photocathodes. This ERF gun will provide high brightness electron beams at an unprecedented average power. The objective of this ERL is to serve as a platform for R&D into high current ERL. In particular issues of halo generation and control, Higher-order mode issues, coherent emissions for the beam and high brightness, high power beam generation and preservation. Following its completion we plan to use it for various applications, such as the generation of THz radiation and high power x rays through compton scattering of laser light off its electron beam.

=== Cornell University ===
Cornell University, in partnership with Brookhaven National Laboratory, are in the process of constructing CBETA, an ERL built using FFAG optics and superconducting RF cavities, targeting up to 100 mA of CW electron beam at up to 150 MeV, as part of a research program for a future electron-ion collider.

== A project to improve CERN's LHC into an LHeC ==
A recent study suggests to improve CERN's Large Hadron Collider (LHC), the largest accelerator existing at present (2013), by adding to the large storage ring of the LHC a tangential construction of two electron Energy recovery linacs, each of 1008 m length, producing thus the possibility to obtain not only Hadron-Hadron smashes, but also, e.g., Hadron-Electron ones, and thus to improve the LHC into some kind of "LHeC".

For this suggestion, originating from a special committee of CERN physicists, M. Klein (Liverpool university), on the suggestion of the UK's Institute of Physics, received the 2013 mutual Max Born Prize of the British and the German Physical Societies.

== See also ==
- ALICE (accelerator), Energy Recovery Linac Prototype, at Daresbury Laboratory in Cheshire, England
