= EMMA (accelerator) =

Particle accelerator at Daresbury Laboratory

Coordinates: 53°20′35″N 2°38′26″W

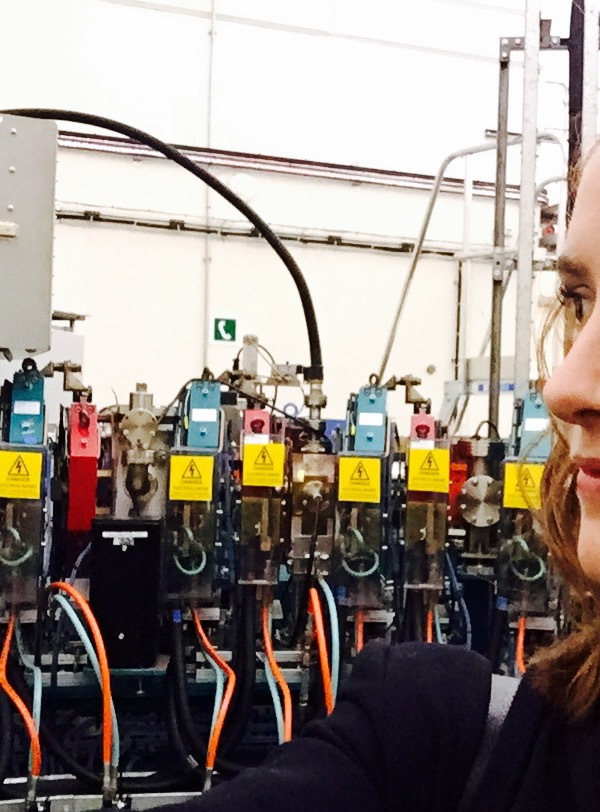
A series of quadrupole magnets that compose the EMMA particle accelerator at Daresbury Laboratory, UK

The electron machine with many applications or electron model for many applications (EMMA) was a linear non-scaling FFAG (fixed-field alternating-gradient) particle accelerator at Daresbury Laboratory in the UK that could accelerate electrons from 10 to 20 MeV.

A FFAG is a type of accelerator in which the magnetic field in the bending magnets is constant during acceleration. This means the particle beam will move radially outwards as its momentum increases. Acceleration was successfully demonstrated in EMMA, paving the way for future non-scaling FFAGs to meet important applications in energy, security and medicine.

A linear non-scaling FFAG is one in which a quantity known as the betatron tune is allowed to vary unchecked. In a conventional synchrotron such a variation would result in loss of the beam. However, in EMMA the beam crossed these resonances so rapidly that their effect was not seen. EMMA used the ALICE accelerator as a source of electrons and was situated in the same laboratory (specifically, in one of the experimental areas at the base of the Nuclear Structure Facility tower) at STFC's Daresbury site.

EMMA was a proof-of-principle machine; the experience gained in building this machine was useful for future muon accelerators (which could be used in neutrino factories), and also for proton and carbon ion particle accelerators, which have applications for cancer therapy.

Non-scaling FFAGs are a good candidate for use in an accelerator-driven subcritical reactor system in which a non-critical fission core is driven to criticality by a small accelerator. Future electrical power generation could be influenced heavily by the use power stations consisting of a sub-critical core containing a material such as thorium, and a small accelerator capable of providing extra neutrons via a spallation target.

EMMA was funded by the BASROC consortium, under the CONFORM umbrella. Commissioning of EMMA began in June 2010 when the beam was injected and sent around part of the ring. Full ring commissioning commenced in August 2010. In March 31 2011, full ring circumnavigation was completed to establish proof of principle.

By May 2016, decommissioning of both EMMA and ALICE started, and in 2019 the process was completed, with most components being donated to other facilities.
