= Fixed-field alternating gradient accelerator =

Circular particle accelerator concept

A Fixed-Field alternating gradient Accelerator (FFA; also abbreviated FFAG) is a circular particle accelerator concept that can be characterized by its time-independent magnetic fields (fixed-field, like in a cyclotron) and the use of alternating gradient strong focusing (as in a synchrotron).

In all circular accelerators, magnetic fields are used to bend the particle beam. Since the magnetic force required to bend the beam increases with particle energy, as the particles accelerate, either their paths will increase in size, or the magnetic field must be increased over time to hold the particles in a constant size orbit. Fixed-field machines, such as cyclotrons and FFAs, use the former approach and allow the particle path to change with acceleration.

In order to keep particles confined to a beam, some type of focusing is required. Small variations in the shape of the magnetic field, while maintaining the same overall field direction, are known as weak focusing. Strong, or alternating gradient focusing, involves magnetic fields which alternately point in opposite directions. The use of alternating gradient focusing allows for more tightly focused beams and smaller accelerator cavities.

FFAs use fixed magnetic fields which include changes in field direction around the circumference of the ring. This means that the beam will change radius over the course of acceleration, as in a cyclotron, but will remain more tightly focused, as in a synchrotron. FFAs therefore combine relatively less expensive fixed magnets with increased beam focus of strong focusing machines.

The initial concept of the FFA was developed in the 1950s, but was not actively explored beyond a few test machines until the mid-1980s, for usage in neutron spallation sources, as a driver for muon colliders and to accelerate muons in a neutrino factory since the mid-1990s.

The revival in FFA research has been particularly strong in Japan with the construction of several rings. This resurgence has been prompted in part by advances in RF cavities and in magnet design.

== History ==
=== First development phase ===
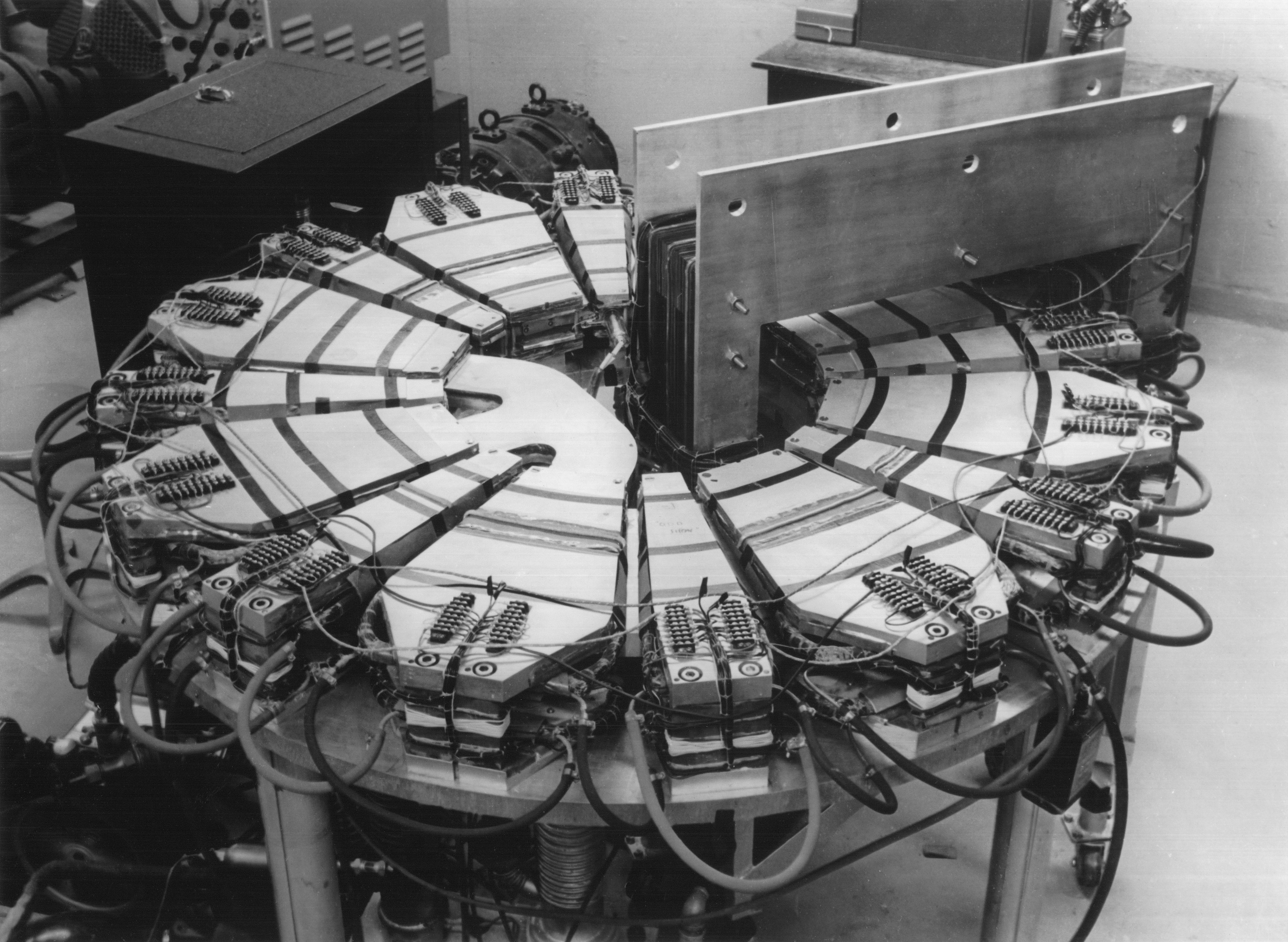
The Michigan Mark I FFA accelerator. This 400KeV electron accelerator was the first operational FFA accelerator. The large rectangular part on the right is the betatron transformer core.

The idea of fixed-field alternating-gradient synchrotrons was developed independently in Japan by Tihiro Ohkawa, in the United States by Keith Symon, and in Russia by Andrei Kolomensky. The first prototype, built by Lawrence W. Jones and Kent M. Terwilliger at the University of Michigan used betatron acceleration and was operational in early 1956. That fall, the prototype was moved to the Midwestern Universities Research Association (MURA) lab at University of Wisconsin, where it was converted to a 500 keV electron synchrotron. Symon's patent, filed in early 1956, uses the terms "FFAG accelerator" and "FFAG synchrotron". Ohkawa worked with Symon and the MURA team for several years starting in 1955.

Donald Kerst, working with Symon, filed a patent for the spiral-sector FFA accelerator at around the same time as Symon's Radial Sector patent. A very small spiral sector machine was built in 1957, and a 50 MeV radial sector machine was operated in 1961. This last machine was based on Ohkawa's patent, filed in 1957, for a symmetrical machine able to simultaneously accelerate identical particles in both clockwise and counterclockwise beams. This was one of the first colliding beam accelerators, although this feature was not used when it was put to practical use as the injector for the Tantalus storage ring at what would become the Synchrotron Radiation Center. The 50MeV machine was finally retired in the early 1970s.

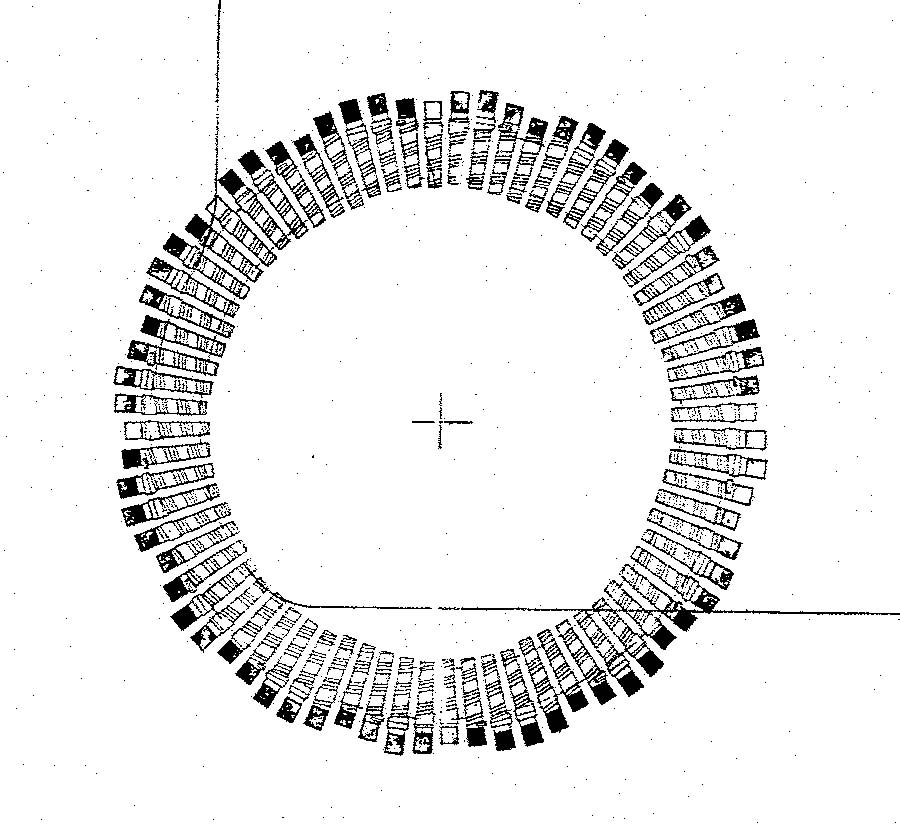
Layout of MURA FFA

MURA designed 10 GeV and 12.5 GeV proton FFAs that were not funded. Two scaled down designs, one for 720 MeV and one for a 500 MeV injector, were published.

With the shutdown of MURA which began 1963 and ended 1967, the FFA concept was not in use on an existing accelerator design and thus was not actively discussed for some time.

=== Continuing development ===
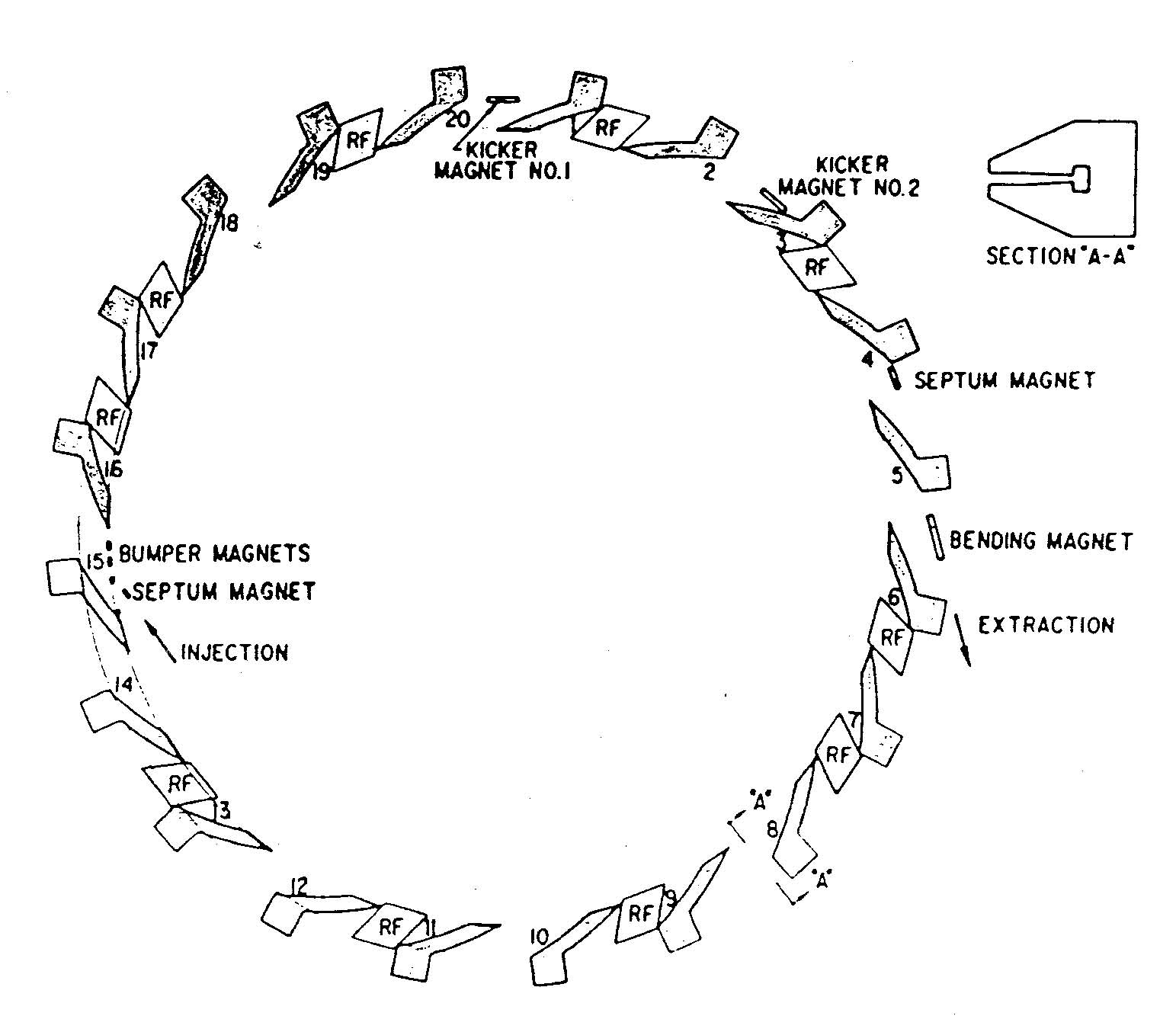
ASPUN ring (scaling FFA). The first ANL design ASPUN was a spiral machine designed to increase momentum threefold with a modest spiral as compared with the MURA machines.

Example of a 16-cell superconducting FFA. Energy: 1.6 GeV, average radius 26 m.

In the early 1980s, it was suggested by Phil Meads that an FFA was suitable and advantageous as a proton accelerator for an intense spallation neutron source, starting off projects like the Argonne Tandem Linear Accelerator at Argonne National Laboratory and the Cooler Synchrotron at Jülich Research Centre.

Conferences exploring this possibility were held at Jülich Research Centre, starting from 1984. There have also been numerous annual workshops focusing on FFA accelerators at CERN, KEK, BNL, TRIUMF, Fermilab, and the Reactor Research Institute at Kyoto University. In 1992, the European Particle Accelerator Conference at CERN was about FFA accelerators.

The first proton FFA was successfully construction in 2000, initiating a boom of FFA activities in high-energy physics and medicine.

With superconducting magnets, the required length of the FFA magnets scales roughly as the inverse square of the magnetic field. In 1994, a coil shape which provided the required field with no iron was derived. This magnet design was continued by S. Martin et al. from Jülich.

In 2010, after the workshop on FFA accelerators in Kyoto, the construction of the Electron Machine with Many Applications (EMMA) was completed at Daresbury Laboratory, UK. This was the first non-scaling FFA accelerator. Non-scaling FFAs are often advantageous to scaling FFAs because large and heavy magnets are avoided and the beam is much better controlled.

== Scaling vs non-scaling types ==
The magnetic fields needed for an FFA are quite complex. The computation for the magnets used on the Michigan FFA Mark Ib, a radial sector 500 keV machine from 1956, were done by Frank Cole at the University of Illinois on a mechanical calculator built by Friden. This was at the limit of what could be reasonably done without computers; the more complex magnet geometries of spiral sector and non-scaling FFAs require sophisticated computer modeling.

The MURA machines were scaling FFA synchrotrons meaning that orbits of any momentum are photographic enlargements of those of any other momentum. In such machines the betatron frequencies are constant, thus no resonances, that could lead to beam loss, are crossed. A machine is scaling if the median plane magnetic field satisfies

$$B_r =0 , \quad B_{\theta} =0 , \quad B_z=a r^k ~f(\psi)$$,

where

- $\psi=N~[\tan~\zeta~\ln(r/r_0)~ - ~\theta]$,
- $k$ is the field index,
- $N$ is the periodicity,
- $\zeta$ is the spiral angle (which equals zero for a radial machine),
- $r$ the average radius, and
- $f(\psi)$ is an arbitrary function that enables a stable orbit.

For $k>>1$ an FFA magnet is much smaller than that for a cyclotron of the same energy. The disadvantage is that these machines are highly nonlinear. These and other relationships are developed in the paper by Frank Cole.

The idea of building a non-scaling FFA first occurred to Kent Terwilliger and Lawrence W. Jones in the late 1950s while thinking about how to increase the beam luminosity in the collision regions of the 2-way colliding beam FFA they were working on. This idea had immediate applications in designing better focusing magnets for conventional accelerators, but was not applied to FFA design until several decades later.

If acceleration is fast enough, the particles can pass through the betatron resonances before they have time to build up to a damaging amplitude. In that case the dipole field can be linear with radius, making the magnets smaller and simpler to construct. A proof-of-principle linear, non-scaling FFA called (EMMA) (Electron Machine with Many Applications) has been successfully operated at Daresbury Laboratory, UK.

== Vertical FFAs ==
Vertical Orbit Excursion FFAs (VFFAs) are a special type of FFA arranged so that higher energy orbits occur above (or below) lower energy orbits, rather than radially outward. This is accomplished with skew-focusing fields that push particles with higher beam rigidity vertically into regions with a higher dipole field.

The major advantage offered by a VFFA design over a FFA design is that the path-length is held constant between particles with different energies and therefore relativistic particles travel isochronously. Isochronicity of the revolution period enables continuous beam operation, therefore offering the same advantage in power that isochronous cyclotrons have over synchrocyclotrons. Isochronous accelerators have no longitudinal beam focusing, but this is not a strong limitation in accelerators with rapid ramp rates typically used in FFA designs.

The major disadvantages include the fact that VFFAs requires unusual magnet designs and currently VFFA designs have only been simulated rather than tested.

== Applications ==
FFA accelerators have potential medical applications in proton therapy for cancer, as proton sources for high intensity neutron production, for non-invasive security inspections of closed cargo containers, for the rapid acceleration of muons to high energies before they have time to decay, and as "energy amplifiers", for Accelerator-Driven Sub-critical Reactors (ADSRs) / Sub-critical Reactors in which a neutron beam derived from a FFA drives a slightly sub-critical fission reactor. Such ADSRs would be inherently safe, having no danger of accidental exponential runaway, and relatively little production of transuranium waste, with its long life and potential for nuclear weapons proliferation.

Because of their quasi-continuous beam and the resulting minimal acceleration intervals for high energies, FFAs have also gained interest as possible parts of future muon collider facilities.

== Status ==
In the 1990s, researchers at the KEK particle physics laboratory near Tokyo began developing the FFA concept, culminating in a 150 MeV machine in 2003. A non-scaling machine, dubbed PAMELA, to accelerate both protons and carbon nuclei for cancer therapy has been designed. Meanwhile, an ADSR operating at 100 MeV was demonstrated in Japan in March 2009 at the Kyoto University Critical Assembly (KUCA), achieving "sustainable nuclear reactions" with the critical assembly's control rods inserted into the reactor core to damp it below criticality.

== See also ==
- Energy amplifier a subcritical nuclear reactor which might use an FFA as a neutron source
