= Donald William Kerst =

American physicist who developed the betatron

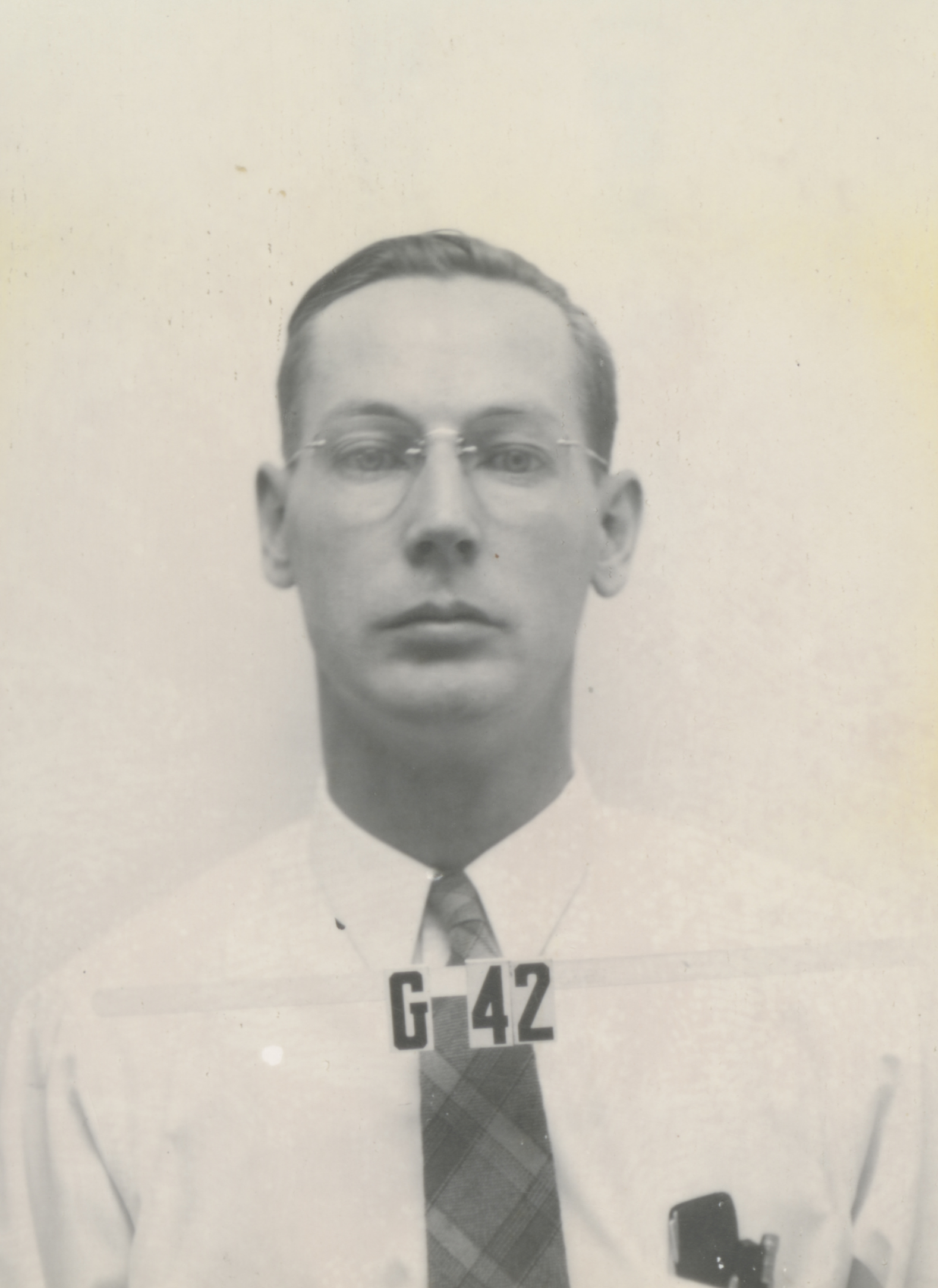
- Kerst's Los Alamos badge
- Born: Donald William Kerst; November 1, 1911; Galena, Illinois, U.S.
- Died: August 19, 1993 (aged 81); Madison, Wisconsin, U.S.
- Education: University of Wisconsin–Madison (BA 1934, PhD 1937)
- Known for: Betatron
- Awards: Comstock Prize in Physics (1943)
- Scientific career
- Fields: Physics (Accelerator physics, Plasma physics)
- Workplaces: University of Illinois; Los Alamos Laboratory; University of Wisconsin
- Thesis: The Development of Electrostatic Generators in Air Pressure and Applications to Excitation Functions of Nuclear Reactions (1937)

Donald William Kerst (November 1, 1911 – August 19, 1993) was an American physicist who worked on advanced particle accelerator concepts (accelerator physics) and plasma physics. He is most notable for his development of the betatron, a novel type of particle accelerator used to accelerate electrons.

A graduate of the University of Wisconsin–Madison, Kerst developed the first betatron at the University of Illinois at Urbana Champaign, where it became operational on July 15, 1940. During World War II, Kerst took a leave of absence in 1940 and 1941 to work on it with the engineering staff at General Electric, and he designed a portable betatron for inspecting dud bombs. In 1943 he joined the Manhattan Project's Los Alamos Laboratory, where he was responsible for designing and building the Water Boiler, a nuclear reactor intended to serve as a laboratory instrument.

From 1953 to 1957 Kerst was technical director of the Midwestern Universities Research Association, where he worked on advanced particle accelerator concepts, most notably the FFAG accelerator. He was then employed at General Atomics's John Jay Hopkins Laboratory from 1957 to 1962, where he worked on the problem of plasma physics. With Tihiro Ohkawa he invented toroidal devices for containing the plasma with magnetic fields. Their devices were the first to contain plasma without the instabilities that had plagued previous designs, and the first to contain plasma for lifetimes exceeding the Bohm diffusion limit.

== Early life ==
Donald William Kerst was born in Galena, Illinois November 1, 1911, the son of Herman Samuel Kerst and Lillian E Wetz. He entered the University of Wisconsin, where he earned a Bachelor of Arts (BA) degree in 1934, and then his Doctor of Philosophy (PhD) in 1937, writing his thesis on "The Development of Electrostatic Generators in Air Pressure and Applications to Excitation Functions of Nuclear Reactions". This involved building and testing a 2.3 MeV generator for experiments with the scattering of protons.

== Betatron ==
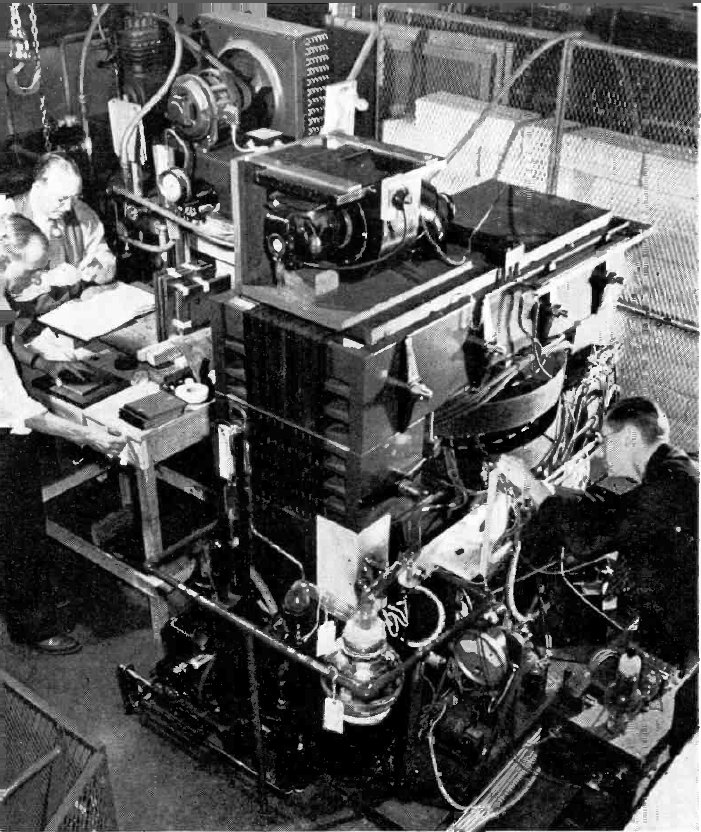
Kerst (right) seen working on the first betatron in 1942

After graduation, Kerst worked at General Electric Company for a year, working on the development of x-ray tubes and machines. He found this frustrating, as x-ray research required high energies that could not be produced at the time. In 1938 he accepted an offer of an instructorship at the University of Illinois at Urbana Champaign, where the head of the physics department, F. Wheeler Loomis encouraged Kerst in his efforts to create a better particle accelerator. The result of these efforts was the betatron. When it became operational on July 15, 1940, Kerst became the first person to accelerate electrons using electromagnetic induction, reaching energies of 2.3 MeV.

In December 1941 Kerst decided on "betatron", using the Greek letter "beta", which was the symbol for electrons, and "tron" meaning "instrument for". He went on to build more betatrons of increasing energy, a 20 MeV machine in 1941, an 80 MeV in 1948, and a 340 MeV machine, which was completed in 1950.

The betatron would influence all subsequent accelerators. Its success was due to a thorough understanding of the physics involved, and painstaking design of the magnets, vacuum pumps and power supply. In 1941, he teamed up with Robert Serber to provide the first theoretical analysis of the oscillations that occur in a betatron. The original 1940 machine was donated to the Smithsonian Institution in 1960.

== World War II ==
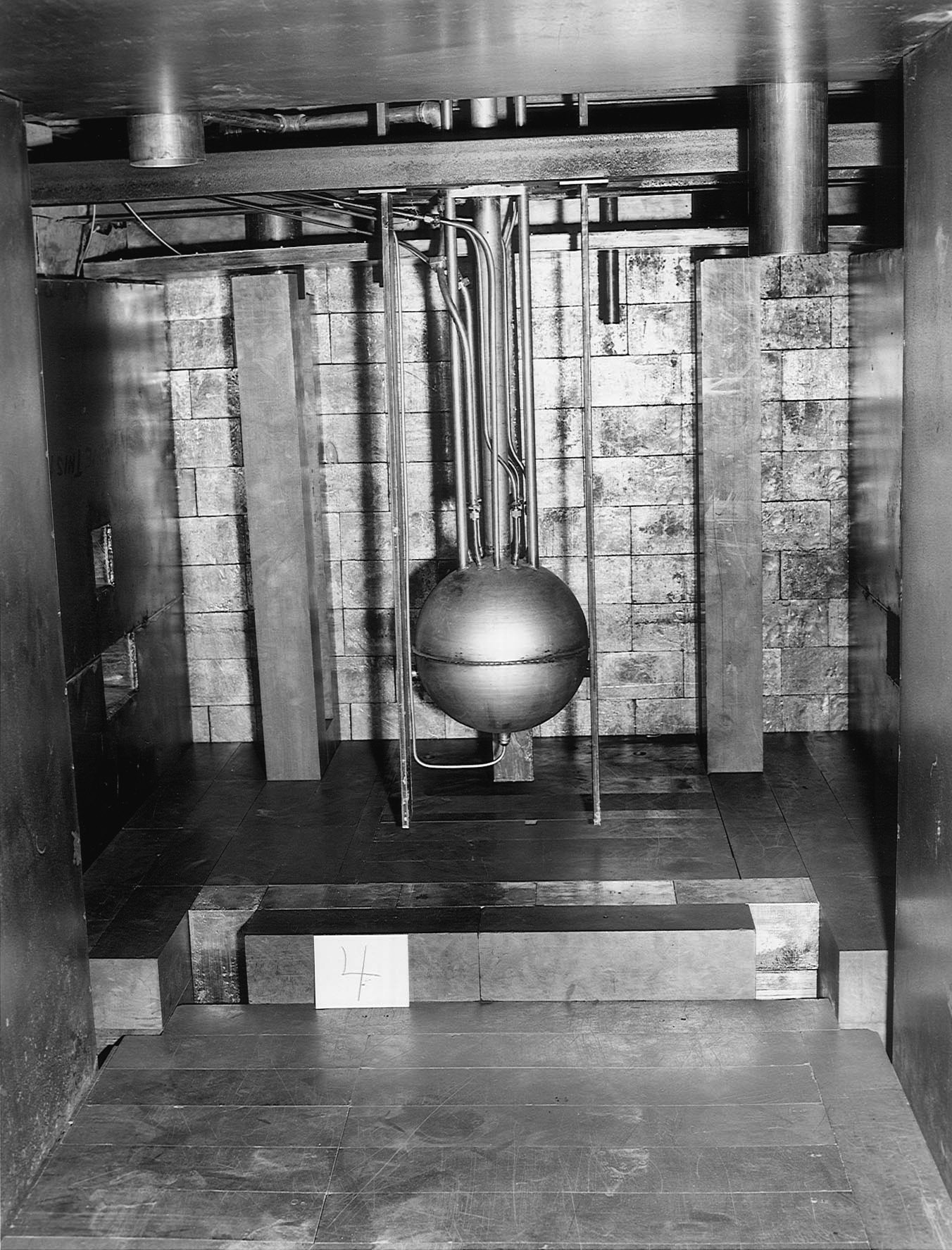
The Water Boiler, an aqueous homogeneous reactor at the Los Alamos Laboratory, was the first reactor to use enriched uranium as a fuel

During World War II, Kerst took a leave of absence from the University of Illinois to work on the development of the betatron with the engineering staff at General Electric in 1940 and 1941. They designed 20 MeV and 100 MeV versions of the betatron, and he supervised the construction of the former, which he brought back to the University of Illinois with him. He also designed a portable 4 MeV betatron for inspecting dud bombs.

Kerst's engineering and physics background placed him near the top of the list of scientists that Robert Oppenheimer recruited for the Manhattan Project's Los Alamos Laboratory, which was set up to design the atomic bomb. In August 1943, Kerst was placed in charge of the Laboratory's P-7 Group, which was responsible for designing and building the Water Boiler, a nuclear reactor intended to serve as a laboratory instrument to test critical mass calculations and the effect of various tamper materials. Primarily drawn from Purdue University, his group included Charles P. Baker, Gerhart Friedlander, Lindsay Helmholtz, Marshall Holloway, and Raemer Schreiber. Robert F. Christy provided help with the theoretical calculations.

Kerst designed an aqueous homogeneous reactor in which enriched uranium in the form of soluble uranium sulfate, was dissolved in water, and surrounded by a beryllium oxide neutron reflector. It was the first reactor to employ enriched uranium as a fuel, and required most of the world's meager supply at the time. A sufficient quantity of enriched uranium arrived at Los Alamos by April 1944, and the Water Boiler commenced operation in May. By the end of June it had achieved all of its design goals.

The Los Alamos Laboratory was reorganized in August 1944 to concentrate on creating an implosion-type nuclear weapon. Studying implosion on a large scale, or even a full scale, required special diagnostic methods. As early as November 1943, Kerst suggested using a betatron employing 20 MeV gamma rays instead of x-rays to study implosion. In the August 1944 reorganization, he became joint head, with Seth Neddermeyer, of the G-5 Group, part of Robert Bacher's G (Gadget) Division specifically charged with betatron testing. Oppenheimer had the 20 MeV betatron at the University of Illinois shipped to Los Alamos, where it arrived in December. On January 15, 1945, the G-5 Group took their first betatron pictures of an implosion.

== Later life ==
Kerst returned to the University of Illinois after the war. From 1953 to 1957 he was technical director of the Midwestern Universities Research Association, where he worked on advanced particle accelerator concepts, most notably the FFAG accelerator. He developed the spiral-sector focusing principle, which lies at the heart of many spiral ridge cyclotrons that are now in operation around the world. His team devised and analysed beam stacking, a process of radio frequency acceleration in fixed field machines that led to the development of the colliding beam accelerators.

From 1957 to 1962 Kerst was employed at the General Atomics division of General Dynamics's John Jay Hopkins Laboratory for Pure and Applied Science in La Jolla, California, where he worked on plasma physics, which it was hoped was the doorway to the control of thermonuclear energy. With Tihiro Ohkawa he invented toroidal devices for containing the plasma with magnetic fields. The two completed this work at the University of Wisconsin, where Kerst was a professor from 1962 until his retirement in 1980. Their devices were the first to contain plasma without the instabilities that had plagued previous designs, and the first to contain plasma for lifetimes exceeding the Bohm diffusion limit. From 1972 to 1973 he was also chairman of the Plasma Physics Division of the American Physical Society.

Kerst was married to Dorothy Birkett Kerst. They had two children, a daughter, Marilyn, and a son, Stephen. After he retired, Kerst and Dorothy moved to Fort Myers, Florida. He died on August 19, 1993, at the University Hospital and Clinics in Madison, Wisconsin, from a brain tumor. He was survived by his wife and children. His papers are in the University of Illinois Archives.

== Awards and honors ==
- Honorary degree, Lawrence College, 1942.
- Awarded Comstock Prize in Physics, National Academy of Sciences, 1943.
- Awarded John Scott Award, City of Philadelphia, 1946.
- Awarded John Price Wetherill Medal, Franklin Institute, 1950.
- Elected to the National Academy of Sciences, 1951.
- Honorary degree, University of São Paulo, 1953.
- Honorary degree, University of Wisconsion, 1961.
- Founding member of the World Cultural Council, 1981.
- Awarded James Clerk Maxwell Prize in plasma physics, American Physical Society, 1984.
- Awarded Robert R. Wilson Prize for accelerator physics, 1988.
- Honorary degree, University of Illinois, 1989.
