= Synchrotron Radiation Center =

Synchrotron light source research facility in Stoughton, Wisconsin

- Motto: "Illuminating the path to scientific discovery"
- Established: 1968 - 2014
- Research type: Synchrotron light source
- Director: Joseph Bisognano
- Location: Stoughton, Wisconsin, USA; 42.9611°N 89.2905°W
- Operating agency: University of Wisconsin–Madison
- Website: www.src.wisc.edu

The Synchrotron Radiation Center (SRC), located in Stoughton, Wisconsin and operated by the University of Wisconsin–Madison, was a national synchrotron light source research facility, operating the Aladdin storage ring. From 1968 to 1987 SRC was the home of Tantalus, the first storage ring dedicated to the production of synchrotron radiation.

== History ==
=== The Road to SRC: 1953–1968 ===
15 universities formed the Midwest Universities Research Association (MURA) in 1953 to promote and design a high energy proton synchrotron, to be built in the Midwest. With the intent of constructing a large accelerator, MURA purchased a suitable area of land with an underlying flat limestone base near Stoughton, Wisconsin, about 10 miles (16 km) from the Madison campus of the University of Wisconsin.

MURA's first accelerator was a 45 MeV synchrotron, built in a concrete underground "vault", mostly for radiation protection purposes. A small electron storage ring, operating at 240 MeV, was designed by Ed Rowe (Ednor Marsh Rowe, 1927-1996) and collaborators as a test facility to study high currents, and construction of this ring started in 1965. However, in 1963 President Johnson had decided that the next large accelerator facility would not be built at the MURA site, but in Batavia, Illinois; this became Fermilab. In 1967 MURA dissolved with the storage ring incomplete and with no further funding. The researchers, feeling teased by fate (and the government backers) named the machine after the mythological figure Tantalus, famed for his eternal punishment to stand beneath a fruit tree with the fruit ever eluding his grasp.

In 1966 a subcommittee of the National Research Council, which had been investigating the properties of synchrotron radiation from the 240 MeV ring, recommended it be completed as a tool for spectroscopy. A successful proposal was made to the US Air Force Office of Scientific Research, and the ring was completed in 1968—the first storage ring dedicated to the production of synchrotron radiation.

With the demise of MURA, a new entity was created to run the facility: the Synchrotron Radiation Center (SRC), administered by the University of Wisconsin.

=== Tantalus: 1968–1987 ===
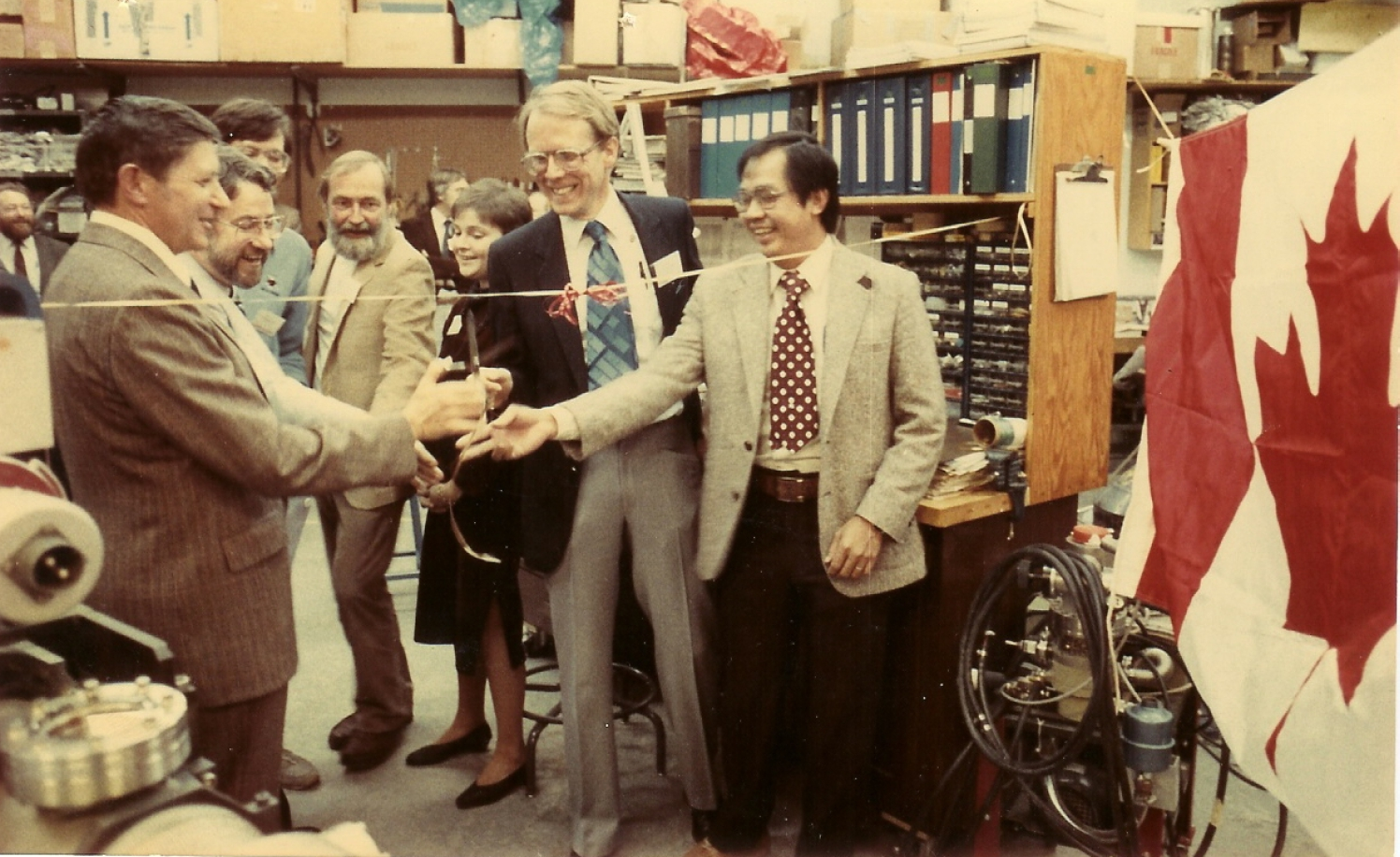
Ed Rowe (Center) at the opening of a Canadian PRT beamline on Tantalus in 1983

Tantalus had a circumference of just over 9 metres (30 ft), and, with an energy of 240 MeV, had a critical energy of slightly under 50 eV. It achieved its first stored beam in March 1968. Initial operations were very difficult, with only about 5 hours per week of usable beam, and currents of less than 1 mA. Initial users came from three groups, who took turns using their commercial monochromators on the one available beamline. On August 7, 1968, this first dedicated storage ring based synchrotron radiation facility produced its first data when Ulrich Gerhardt of the University of Chicago, carried out simultaneous reflection and absorption measurements on CdS over the wavelength range 1100-2700 Å.

In 1972 the building was enlarged to accommodate new beamlines, and by 1973 there were ten ports, and beam currents were up to about 50 mA. A new injector, a 40 MeV microtron, was installed as an injector in 1974, replacing the original MURA accelerator that had been used until that point, and within a year currents exceeded 150 mA, with typically over 30 hours of beam per week. A stored beam of 260 mA was achieved in 1977. In October 1974 the National Science Foundation took over funding from the Air Force.

Initial monochromators were commercial instruments with drawbacks for use at a synchrotron. SRC started a program of instrument development, both to take advantage of the unique properties of synchrotron radiation and to make beamlines available to users without their own instruments. Such users became known as "general users", while groups with their own beamlines became known as Participating Research Teams (PRTs). This model has become widely used at other facilities, where PRTs are also denoted Collaborating Access Teams (CATs) and Collaborating Research Groups (CRGs). PRTs have been used extensively by US scientists at US facilities but by 2010 were somewhat out of favor. The CRG in Europe, however, remains as an important and successful means of flexible access.

For two decades Tantalus produced hundreds of experiments and was a testing ground for many synchrotron techniques still in use. Current synchrotron facilities can be very large, while Tantalus was not, and its small building, even after the 1972 expansion, was crowded with equipment and researchers. Users worked in very close quarters and the close proximity combined with the relative isolation of the facility, made cross fertilization of ideas unavoidable. The atmosphere was open, friendly, and informal, although not particularly comfortable physically, The heating system in one washroom did not work, so, to avoid frozen pipes, users just left the door wide open. After someone posted a sign alerting users to the policy, an international contest began, with each person translating the message into their own language. A copy of this sign was included as part of an NSF funding request as evidence of Tantalus's growing international impact.

Research during those early years was dominated by optical spectroscopy. In 1971 an IBM research group produced the first photoelectron spectra using Tantalus, a milestone in the development of photoemission spectroscopy as a research tool. The tunability of the radiation allowed researchers to disentangle a material's ground-state electronic properties. In the mid-1970s the increasing beam current from the ring gave intensity levels sufficient for angle-resolved photoemission spectroscopy, with a joint Bell Labs–Montana State University group conducting the earliest experiments. As an experimental technique, angle-resolved photoemission developed rapidly and had an important conceptual impact on condensed-matter physics. Gas-phase spectroscopy was another successful field at SRC, starting from early absorption studies of noble gases.

With the new Aladdin storage ring operating, Tantalus was officially decommissioned in 1987, although it was run for six weeks in the summer of 1988 for experiments in atomic and molecular fluorescence. The storage ring was disassembled in 1995, and half the ring, the RF cavity and one of the original beamlines are now in storage at the Smithsonian Institution.

=== Aladdin, the early years: 1976–1986 ===
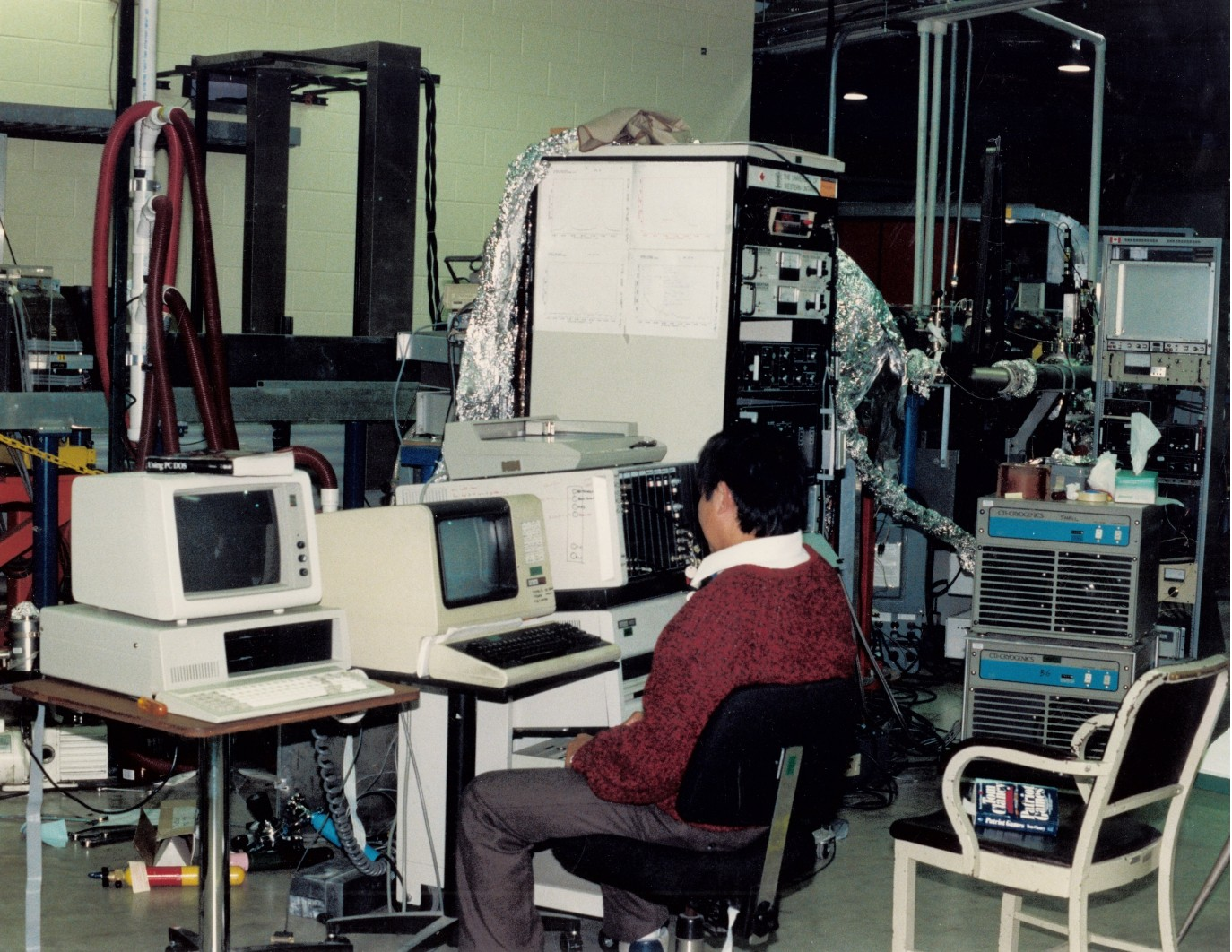
One of the first beamlines on the Aladdin synchrotron, late 1980s

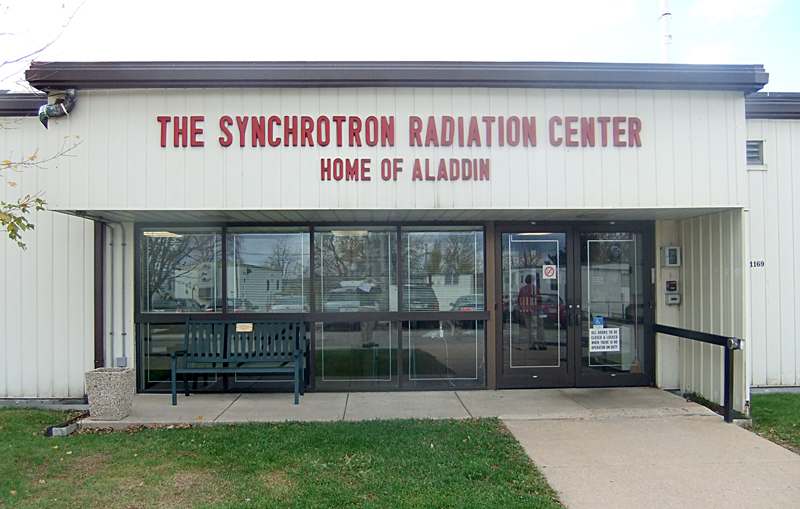
Entrance to the Synchrotron Radiation Center, 2011.

In 1976 SRC submitted a proposal to the NSF for a 750 MeV storage ring as an intense source of VUV and soft x-ray radiation to an energy greater than 1 keV. This proposed ring was named Aladdin. Funding for the new ring was obtained from the NSF, the State of Wisconsin, and the Wisconsin Alumni Research Foundation (WARF). The final design was a four straight section 1 GeV ring, of 89 metres (292 ft) circumference, and construction of some components started in 1978. A new 32,000 square feet (3,000 m^{2}) building to house the facility started construction in April 1979. The initial target date for first stored beam was October 1980.

The construction phase of Aladdin ended in 1981, but by late 1984 SRC had been unable to complete the commissioning of the facility, with a maximum stored current of 2.5 mA, too little to provide useful light intensities. Accelerator experts reviewing the project recommended the addition of a booster synchrotron at a cost of US$25 million (equivalent to $77.47 million in 2025). In May 1985, after a review by L. Edward Temple of the Department of Energy, which recommended still another study period while difficulties were ironed out, NSF director Eric Bloch decided not only against the upgrade, but also against continued funding for Aladdin operations. SRC was kept running with existing NSF funding for Tantalus and funds from WARF. The University of Wisconsin made it clear it would only continue funding Aladdin until June 1986, a situation characterized on campus as the Perils of Pauline. Concurrent with these events, the technical issue limiting the machine performance had been solved, and three months after the decision to withdraw NSF funding, currents of 40 mA had been achieved. By July 1986 this had risen to over 150 mA, and NSF funding was restored.

=== Closing ===
National Science Foundation funding stopped in 2011. The University of Wisconsin gave SRC US$2 million (equivalent to $2.86 million in 2025) to keep the facility operating until June 2013, while new funding was sought. The biggest budget cutbacks were in education, outreach and support for outside users. By January 2012 the facility had lost about one-third of its staff to retirements and layoffs. In February 2014 the facility director announced that the center would be closing. The final beam run was completed March 7, 2014, after which the process of dismantling and disposing of the equipment began.

=== SRC history project ===
A project, completed in 2011, collected oral histories and historical documents related to SRC. These were deposited in the archives of the University of Wisconsin–Madison, and digitized copies of some of the material are available online.

== G. J. Lapeyre award ==
In 1973 the vault that held Tantalus was being enlarged, and during a facility picnic a rainstorm hit and caused the vault to start to flood. Jerry Lapeyre of Montana State University used the lab's tractor to build earthworks to divert the water. His efforts led then-director Rowe to create the annual G. J. Lapeyre award to be awarded to "one who met and overcame the greatest obstacle in the pursuit of their research". The trophy had an octagonal base representing Tantalus, with a beer can from the lab picnic which preceded the flood, topped by a concrete "raindrop".

== Technical description ==
=== Beamlines ===
Name	Port assigned	Source	Energy range (eV unless stated)	Usage
10m TGM	123		210–800	
4m NIM	081		4–62	
6m TGM	042		8–200	
Ames-Montana ERG-Seya	053		5–1,000	
DCM	093		1,500–4,000	
HERMON	033		62–1,400	
Infrared	031	Bending magnet	650–8,000 cm^{−1}	Infrared spectromicroscopy
IRENI	02	Bending magnet	850–5,500 cm^{−1}	Infrared spectromicroscopy
Mark V Grasshopper	043		32–900	
Nanotech ES-1 Resist Exposure	032		1,000–4,000	
Nanotech ES-2 High Flux	112		1,000–2,400	
Nanotech ES-5 SUSS 200/2M	121		1000–2200	
Nanotech SAL MOD 4	113		1,000–2,400	
PGM undulator on U3	071		8–245 (Branch A); 8–180 (Branch B)	
Stainless Steel Seya	051		5–35	
U11 Nanotech EUV Beamline	111		60–100	
U2 VLS-PGM	041		70–2,000	
U2 Wadsworth	041		7.8–40	
U9 VLS-PGM	091		11.9–270	
Undulator 4m NIM on U1	011		5.9–40	
White light	061		1–1,400	
