= Electron–ion collider =

Particle accelerator under construction in Upton, New York, USA

An electron–ion collider (EIC) is a type of particle accelerator collider designed to collide spin-polarized beams of electrons and ions, in order to study the properties of nuclear matter in detail via deep inelastic scattering. In 2012, a whitepaper was published, proposing the developing and building of an EIC accelerator, and in 2015, the Department of Energy Nuclear Science Advisory Committee (NSAC) named the construction of an electron–ion collider one of the top priorities for the near future in nuclear physics in the United States.

In 2020, The United States Department of Energy announced that an EIC will be built over the next ten years at Brookhaven National Laboratory (BNL) in Upton, New York, at an estimated cost of $1.6 to $2.6 billion. Thomas Jefferson National Accelerator Facility (Jefferson Lab or JLab) is a major partner in the Electron-Ion Collider project.

On 18 September 2020, a ribbon-cutting ceremony was held at BNL, officially launching the development and building of the EIC.

== Proposed designs ==
In Europe, CERN has plans for the LHeC. There are also Chinese and Russian plans for an electron–ion collider.

=== LHeC ===
The LHeC would make use of the existing LHC accelerator and add an electron accelerator to collide electrons with the hadrons.

== Technical challenges ==
=== Polarization ===
In order to allow understanding of spin dependence of the electron-nucleon collisions, both the ion beam and the electron beam must be polarized. Achieving and maintaining high levels of polarization is challenging. Nucleons and electrons pose different issues. Electron polarization is affected by synchrotron radiation. This gives rise to both self polarization via the Sokolov–Ternov effect and depolarization due to the effects of quantum fluctuations. Ignoring the effects of synchrotron radiation, the motion of the spin follows the Thomas BMT equation.

=== High luminosity achievement ===
The luminosity determines the rates of interactions between electrons and nucleons. The weaker a mode of interaction is, the higher luminosity is required to reach an adequate measurement of the process. The luminosity is inversely proportional to the product of the beam sizes of the two colliding species, which implies that the smaller the emittances of the beams, the larger the luminosity. Whereas the electron beam emittance (for a storage ring) is determined by an equilibrium between damping and diffusion from synchrotrotron radiation, the emittance for the ion beam is determined by the initially injected value. The ion beam emittance may be decreased via various methods of beam cooling, such as electron cooling or stochastic cooling. In addition, one must consider the effect of intrabeam scattering, which is largely a heating effect.

== Scientific purpose ==
An electron–ion collider allows probing of the substructure of protons and neutrons via a high energy electron. Protons and neutrons are composed of quarks, interacting via the strong interaction mediated by gluons. The general domain encompassing the study of these fundamental phenomena is nuclear physics, with the low level generally accepted framework being quantum chromodynamics, the 'chromo' resulting from the fact that quarks are described as having three different possible values for color charge (red, green or blue).

Some of the remaining mysteries associated with atomic nuclei include how nuclear properties such as spin and mass emerge from the lower level constituent dynamics of quarks and gluons. Formulations of these mysteries, encompassing research projects, include the proton spin crisis and the proton radius puzzle.

== Collaboration ==
The Electron–Ion Collider user group consists of more than 1400 physicists from over 290 laboratories and universities from 38 countries around the world.

== Previous EICs ==
One electron–ion collider in the past was HERA in Hamburg, Germany. Hera ran from 1992 to 2007 and collided electrons and protons at a center of mass energy of 318 GeV.
