= Betatron =

Cyclic particle accelerator

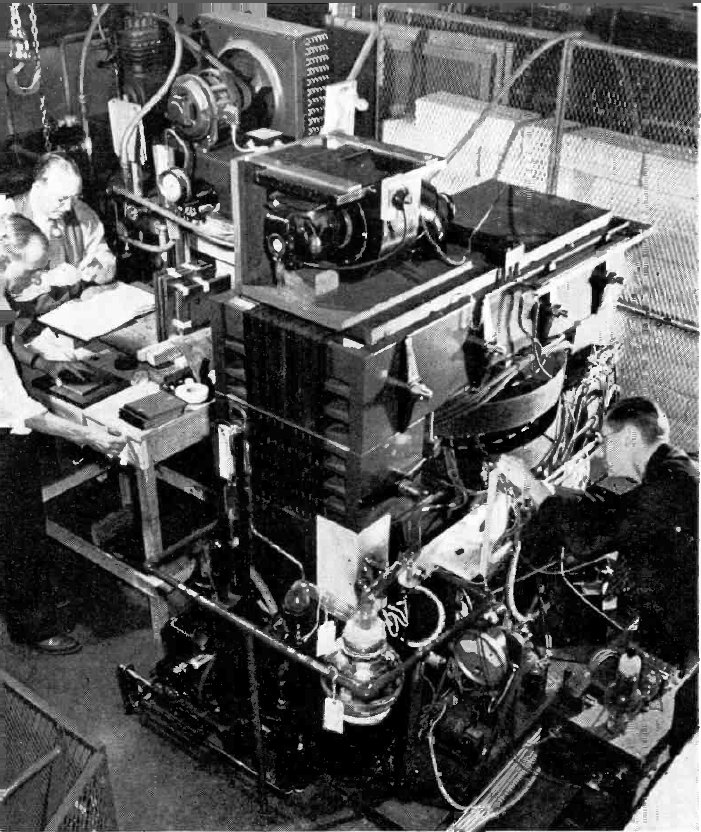
One of the first betatrons built by Donald Kerst (visible right) at University of Illinois, 1940. Its 4-ton magnet could accelerate electrons to 24 MeV.

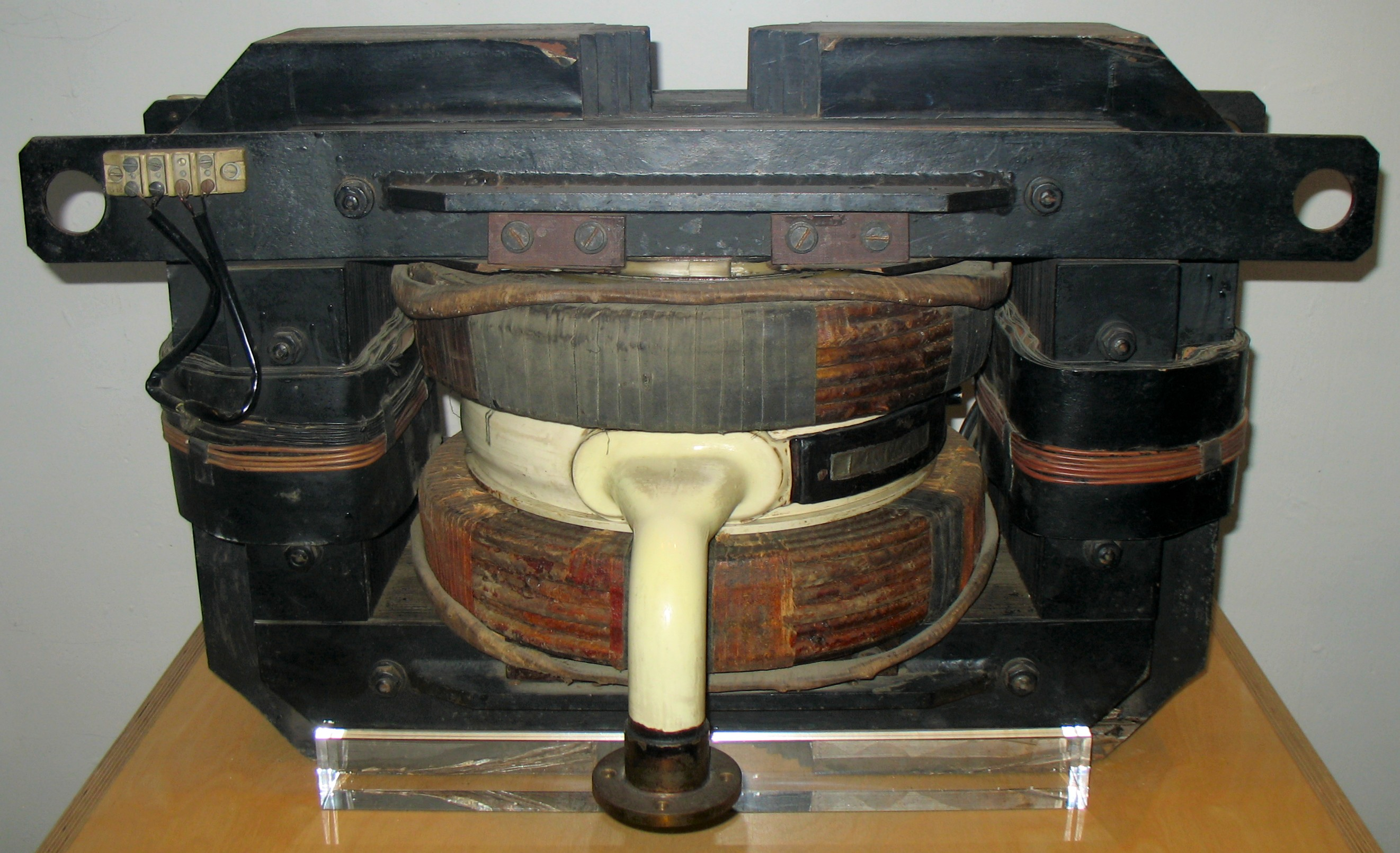
A German 6 MeV betatron (1942)

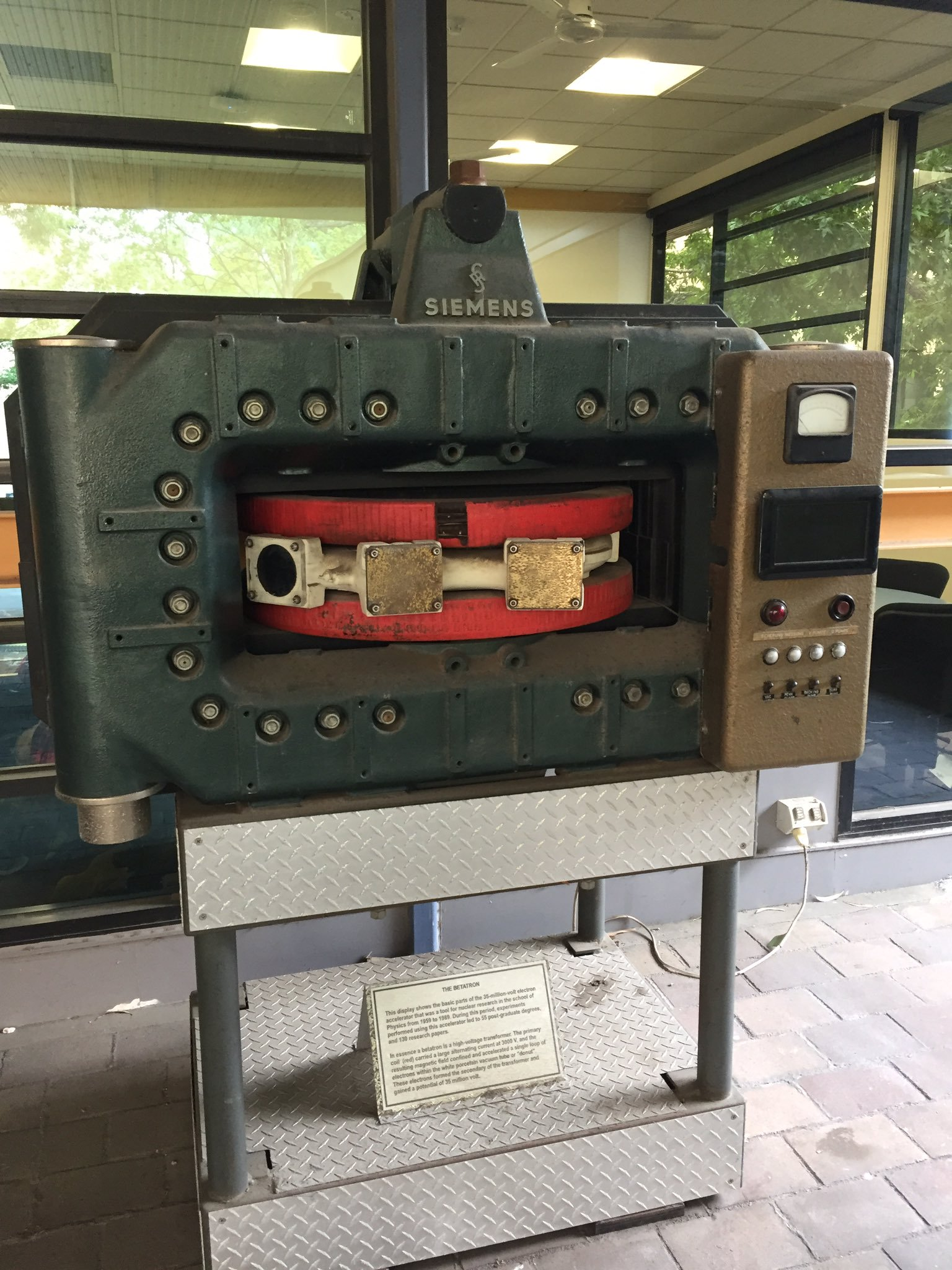
A 35 MeV betatron used for photonuclear physics at the University of Melbourne.

A betatron is a type of cyclic particle accelerator for electrons. It consists of a torus-shaped vacuum chamber with an electron source. Circling the torus is an iron transformer core with a wire winding around it. The device functions similarly to a transformer, with the electrons in the torus-shaped vacuum chamber as its secondary coil. An alternating current in the primary coils accelerates electrons in the vacuum around a circular path. The betatron was the first machine capable of producing electron beams at energies higher than could be achieved with a simple electron gun, and the first circular accelerator in which particles orbited at a constant radius.

The concept of the betatron had been proposed as early as 1922 by Joseph Slepian. Through the 1920s and 30s a number of theoretical problems related to the device were considered by scientists including Rolf Wideroe, Ernest Walton, and Max Steenbeck. The first working betatron was constructed by Donald Kerst at the University of Illinois Urbana-Champaign in 1940.

== History ==
After the discovery in the 1800s of Faraday's law of induction, which showed that an electromotive force could be generated by a changing magnetic field, several scientists speculated that this effect could be used to accelerate charged particles to high energies. Joseph Slepian proposed a device in 1922 that would use permanent magnets to steer the beam while it was accelerated by a changing magnetic field. However, he did not pursue the idea past the theoretical stage.

In the late 1920s, Gregory Breit and Merle Tuve at the Bureau of Terrestrial Magnetism constructed a working device that used varying magnetic fields to accelerate electrons. Their device placed two solenoidal magnets next to one another and fired electrons from a gun at the outer edge of the magnetic field. As the field was increased, the electrons accelerated in to strike a target at the center of the field, producing X-rays. This device took a step towards the betatron concept by shaping the magnetic field to keep the particles focused in the plane of acceleration.

In 1929, Rolf Wideroe made the next major contribution to the development of the theory by deriving the Wideroe Condition for stable orbits. He determined that in order for the orbit radius to remain constant, the field at the radius must be exactly half of the average field over the area of the magnet. This critical calculation allowed for the development of accelerators in which the particles orbited at a constant radius, rather than spiraling inward, as in the case of Breit and Tuve's machine, or outward, as in the case of the cyclotron. Although Wideroe made valuable contributions to the development of the theory of the Betatron, he was unable to build a device in which the electrons orbited more than one and a half times, as his device had no mechanism to keep the beam focused.

Simultaneously with Wideroe's experiments, Ernest Walton analyzed the orbits of electrons in a magnetic field, and determined that it was possible to construct an orbit that was radially focused in the plane of the orbit. Particles in such an orbit which moved a small distance away from the orbital radius would experience a force pushing them back to the correct radius. These oscillations about a stable orbit in a circular accelerator are now referred to as betatron oscillations.

In 1935 Max Steenbeck applied in Germany for a patent on a device that would combine the radial focusing condition of Walton with the vertical focusing used in Breit and Tuve's machine. He later claimed to have built a working machine, but this claim was disputed.

The first team unequivocally acknowledged to have built a working betatron was led by Donald Kerst at the University of Illinois. The accelerator was completed on July 15, 1940.

== Operation principle ==
In a betatron, the changing magnetic field from the primary coil accelerates electrons injected into the vacuum torus, causing them to circle around the torus in the same manner as current is induced in the secondary coil of a transformer (Faraday's law).

The stable orbit for the electrons satisfies
$$\theta_0 = 2 \pi r_0^2 H_0,$$
where

- $\theta_0$ is the flux within the area enclosed by the electron orbit,
- $r_0$ is the radius of the electron orbit, and
- $H_0$ is the magnetic field at $r_0$.

In other words, the magnetic field at the orbit must be half the average magnetic field over its circular cross section:

$$H_0 = \frac{1}{2} \frac{\theta_0}{\pi r_0^2}.$$

This condition is often called Widerøe's condition, or the betatron condition.

== Etymology ==
The name "betatron" (a reference to the beta particle, a fast electron) was chosen during a departmental contest. Other proposals were "rheotron", "induction accelerator", "induction electron accelerator", and even "Außerordentlichehochgeschwindigkeitselektronenentwickelndesschwerarbeitsbeigollitron", a suggestion by a German associate, for "Hard working by golly machine for generating extraordinarily high velocity electrons" or perhaps "Extraordinarily high velocity electron generator, high energy by golly-tron."

== Applications ==
Betatrons were historically employed in particle physics experiments to provide high-energy beams of electrons—up to about 300 MeV. If the electron beam is directed at a metal plate, the betatron can be used as a source of energetic x-rays, which may be used in industrial and medical applications (historically in radiation oncology). A small version of a betatron was also used to provide a source of hard X-rays (by deceleration of the electron beam in a target) for prompt initiation of some experimental nuclear weapons by means of photon-induced fission and photofission in the bomb core.

The Radiation Center, the first private medical center to treat cancer patients with a betatron, was opened by Dr. O. Arthur Stiennon in a suburb of Madison, Wisconsin in the late 1950s.

== Limitations ==
The maximum energy that a betatron can impart is limited by the strength of the magnetic field due to the saturation of iron and by practical size of the magnet core. The next generation of accelerators, the synchrotrons, overcame these limitations.
