= Peter Kalmus (physicist) =

British particle physicist

Peter I. P. Kalmus OBE HonFInstP
- Born: 25 January 1933 (age 93); Prague, Czechoslovakia
- Awards: Rutherford Medal and Prize (1988), Kelvin Prize (2002)
- Scientific career
- Fields: Physics/Particle Physics

Peter Ignaz Paul Kalmus OBE HonFInstP (born 25 January 1933), is a British particle physicist, and emeritus professor of physics at Queen Mary, University of London.

== Education ==
Kalmus received his BSc (1954) and PhD (1957) at University College London where he remained for a further three years as a research associate. He is now an honorary fellow of University College London.

== W and Z particles ==
Discovery of the W particle. The proton-antiproton collision creates a W particle which then decays into a high-energy electron, emitted at a wide angle from the beam (indicated by the arrow at the bottom-right) and an invisible neutrino whose presence is deduced by the missing energy of the electron.

Discovery of the Z particle. The central detector of UA1 reveals the tell-tale signature of the long-awaited Z particle as it decays into an electron-positron pair (arrowed).

The Queen Mary, University of London group led by Peter Kalmus in conjunction with the Rutherford Appleton Laboratory group led by Alan Astbury and the University of Birmingham group led by John Dowell joined Carlo Rubbia at CERN in the UA1 collaboration.

The UA1 experiment was designed to be a general-purpose detector, aimed at investigating phenomena at high energy collisions. Data were obtained from 1981 onwards, when the CERN Super Proton Synchrotron was converted into a proton-antiproton collider, as suggested by Rubbia, using the stochastic beam cooling technique devised by Simon van der Meer. The UK groups had joint responsibility for designing, constructing and operating a large hadron calorimeter and also a trigger processor.

The most celebrated work with the UA1 detector was the discovery in 1983 of the W and Z particles. This discovery provided experimental evidence for electroweak unification: the merging of two of nature's fundamental forces, electromagnetism and the weak force. Electroweak unification demonstrated that nature's four fundamental forces (electromagnetism, weak interaction, strong interaction and gravity) could be reduced to three interactions at energy scales above the unification energy. The unification of these two forces is part of a larger quest to determine if all fundamental forces can be united into a "theory of everything" (Unified Field Theory).

For this work Carlo Rubbia and Simon van der Meer of CERN received the 1984 Nobel Prize for Physics. Alan Astbury received the 1984 Rutherford Medal and Prize, and Peter Kalmus and John Dowell were jointly awarded the 1988 Rutherford Medal and Prize from the Institute of Physics for their outstanding roles in the discovery of the W and Z particles.

== Selected research ==
1957 to 1960 - Kalmus conducted research at UCL mainly on the development of new instruments, helping to build a small particle accelerator, a 29 MeV electron microtron, its beam extraction system, and its external focusing using quadrupole magnets (probably the first use of these in the UK), and later devising an accurate method of measuring relativistic electron beam energies using Cherenkov radiation, then a novel technique.

1960 to 1964 – Kalmus worked for Argonne National Laboratory, USA, initially in the Particle Accelerator Division, directed by Albert Crewe. He was responsible for designing beam-transport equipment for the coming 12.5 GeV Zero Gradient Synchrotron. He transferred to the High Energy Physics Division and in 1961 went to CERN with an Argonne group headed by Art Roberts. It was at CERN that he first met John Dowell, and they designed and set up a particle beamline at the new 25 GeV Proton Synchrotron. The Argonne group used this beamline to conduct a series of measurements of hyperon polarisation using a large optical spark chamber inside a magnetic field: a pioneering technique which much later became the basis of many other electronic imaging chambers. On returning to Argonne in 1962, he collaborated with a University of Chicago group in an experiment on boson production, work which was finished during future visits to the USA as a visiting scientist.

1964 onwards – Kalmus was appointed Lecturer at Queen Mary College, University of London. He began a research collaboration with Alan Astbury of Rutherford Laboratory, which was to continue for about 20 years, when Alan Astbury moved to Canada. The Queen Mary and Rutherford Laboratory collaboration carried out a series of experiments at the new Nimrod accelerator at Rutherford Laboratory, mostly in strong interaction physics: nucleon isobar production in proton-proton collisions and elastic proton-proton scattering at wide angles, this time using spark chambers with sonic readout. Results from this accelerator helped to lay the experimental foundations of the quark model.

In 1970 this collaboration transferred their activities to CERN, to embark on a series of experiments on low energy antiproton-proton interactions. In this they were joined by physicists from Daresbury Laboratory and the University of Liverpool. Kalmus designed the (then) most intense low energy antiproton beam in the world. The experiments on differential cross sections and polarisation for the elastic and two-body meson channels culminated in the discovery of three new mesons and a determination of their quantum numbers. The period 1974 to 1978 was spent carrying out the last set of experiments at Nimrod. Kalmus designed a new low momentum beamline, this time for kaons, for a series of experiments with a polarised deuteron target. Several key measurements were made on kaon-nucleon elastic and charge exchange polarisation.

In late 1977 the Queen Mary group led by Peter Kalmus, along with the Rutherford Appleton Laboratory group under Alan Astbury and the Birmingham University group led by John Dowell joined Carlo Rubbia in the international collaboration known as UA1 at CERN. The UK groups involved had joint responsibility for designing, building and operating a large hadron calorimeter and also a trigger processor as part of the UA1 collaboration. The calorimeter, which measured the energies of strongly-interacting particles emerging from collisions, consisted of 7,000 sheets of plastic scintillator with a total mass of 30 tonnes placed in slots in the return yoke of a large electromagnet. Testing of the scintillator sheets was carried out at Queen Mary using cosmic rays. The scintillator light was transferred via fluorescent wavelength-shifter bars and light guides to 2000 photomultipliers outside the magnet. The number of proton-antiproton collisions exceeded the ability to record these by a factor of at least 1000. This necessitated the design of a trigger processor, a purpose-built electronic device which had to make decisions within 2 microseconds on which 1 in 1000 collisions was likely to be worth recording on magnetic tape for subsequent analysis, and which 999 could be discarded irretrievably. Some years later when the collision rate had increased, a new trigger processor was built.

The most celebrated work with the UA1 detector led to the discovery in 1983 of the W and Z particles. This work resulted in Carlo Rubbia and Simon van der Meer of CERN receiving the 1984 Nobel Prize for Physics. In 1988, Peter Kalmus and John Dowell were jointly awarded the Rutherford Medal and Prize from the Institute of Physics for their outstanding roles in the discovery of the W and Z particles (Alan Astbury had already received this medal in 1984).

UA1 was perhaps the most productive collaboration in the history of particle physics up to that date. It yielded results in quark and lepton physics, tests of quantum chromodynamics, properties of W and Z particles and other topics, which have been published in over 60 papers and presented at numerous conferences. The concept of a universal detector, measuring as much as possible of the outgoing particles from a collider, and covering nearly the whole of the solid angle, has been used ever since at colliding beam machines. This work finished in 1989.

At the end of 1989 the Queen Mary group joined another large collaboration called H1. The H1 collaboration had embarked on building a huge detector for the world's first proton-electron collider, HERA, which was being constructed at the DESY laboratory in Hamburg. The Queen Mary group was responsible for designing and constructing a time-of-flight hodoscope for H1, a piece of apparatus that proved crucial to the operation of the experiment as it reduced the unwanted background by a factor of a hundred. Many of the initiatives came from Kalmus's colleagues Graham Thompson and Eric Eisenhandler, particularly after Kalmus became Head of Department at Queen Mary, University of London in 1992 and had less time for research.

== Publications ==
Kalmus is the author or co-author of about 230 scientific papers. He has always emphasised that modern experimental particle physics research is a group activity, and that past and present colleagues and research students have contributed strongly to the strength of the group.

== Academia and education ==
In parallel with his research activities, Kalmus was a dedicated university teacher. He has taught numerous physics courses, ranging from pre-university A-level to international postgraduate school standard. His initial teaching was in the evenings at Northern Polytechnic and at Chelsea Polytechnic during the period 1955 to 1960. He has taught at all levels at Queen Mary College (Now Queen Mary, University of London), since 1964. Kalmus became Reader at Queen Mary in 1966 and Professor in 1978.

In 1992 Kalmus was appointed Head of Department at Queen Mary. This severely curtailed his personal involvement in the H1 research programme, which however continued to flourish with the strong participation of his colleagues.

Kalmus was given the title Emeritus Professor in 1998 after reaching nominal retirement age. However he continued to work normal hours in the department. He decided not to continue his participation in collaborative research involving enormous teams, and instead to devote more time to other physics interests, such as the Institute of Physics, and in particular to the public awareness and understanding of science.

Peter Kalmus continues to be active as Emeritus Professor of Physics at Queen Mary, University of London.

== Professional and science organisations ==
Kalmus has served on and contributed to a considerable number of professional and science organisations throughout his career. These have included CERN, the Science and Engineering Research Council, the Particle Physics and Astronomy Research Council, the British Association for the Advancement of Science, the Royal Institution, the American Physical Society, the European Physical Society, and the International Union of Pure and Applied Physics. Positions held have included:

CERN:

- Chair of Sub-Committee and Scientific Advisor to the UK CERN delegation, 1978–1981.

Science and Engineering Research Council:

- Member, Nuclear Physics Board, 1979–1982, 1989–1993.
- Member, Astronomy and Planetary Science Board, 1990–1993.

American Physics Society:

- Member, 1963.
- Fellow, 1995.

European Physical Society:

- Member, 1970.
- Member, High Energy Particle Physics Board, 1994–1998.

British Association for the Advancement of Science:

- Member, 1986.
- President, Physics Section, 1990–1991.
- Honorary Fellow, 2002.

International Union of Pure and Applied Physics:

- Member Commission on Particles and Fields (C11), 1993–2002.
- Honorary Secretary C11, 1996–1999.
- Chair C11, 1999–2002.
- Vice President IUPAP, 1999–2002.

Particle Physics and Astronomy Research Council:

- Member, Education and Training Committee, 1994–1998.
- Member, Public Understanding of Science Panel, 1994–1998.

Royal Institution:

- MRI, 1989.
- Member of Council,1996–1999.
- Vice President, 1997–1999.
- Chair, Davy Faraday Laboratory Research Committee, 1998–1999.

Kalmus has been particularly active in serving the Institute of Physics, having served as Council Member, Chair of several groups and committees, and as Vice President with special responsibility for education and public affairs. Through 2005–2009, Kalmus served as Chair of the London and South East Branch of the Institute of Physics. This period culminated in the award of the Institute of Physics Branches Prize in 2010.

Institute of Physics:

- Fellow of the Institute of Physics, 1967
- Chair, High Energy Physics Group, 1989–1993.
- Council Member, 1993–2000.
- Vice President, 1996–2000. Special responsibility for education and public affairs.
- Chair, London and South East Branch, 2005–2009.
- Honorary Fellow, 2010.

Kalmus continued to have involvement with the Institute of Physics after retirement from Queen Mary, serving on its Benevolent Fund Committee, on a panel to examine its journal publishing policy, and as its representative on an international steering group for the World Year of Physics 2005, the centenary of Einstein's "Miracle Year".

== Honours and awards ==
- 1988 - Rutherford Medal and Prize from the Institute of Physics for his outstanding work in the discovery of the W and Z particles.
- 2001 - Honorary Fellow of the University College, London.
- 2001 - OBE for services to physics.
- 2002 - Kelvin Medal and Prize from the Institute of Physics for his outstanding contributions to the public understanding of physics.
- 2002 - Honorary Fellow of the British Science Association.
- 2003 - Honorary Fellow of Queen Mary, University of London.
- 2005 - Outreach Prize of the High Energy Physics Group of the European Physical Society.
- 2010 - Branches Prize by the Institute of Physics.
- 2010 - Honorary Fellow of the Institute of Physics, for his research, his teaching, his public engagement and his work for the Institute. He joined only 38 other recipients including 7 Nobel Laureates.

== Personal life ==
Kalmus' father, Hans Kalmus, was a biologist who worked at University College, London.

His brother, George Kalmus, is another British particle physicist. A press release from the Particle Physics and Astronomy Research Council (PPARC) in 2002 commented that "A particle physicist in the family is a rare occurrence. That there should be two and both be leaders of the field is even more unusual, yet Professors Peter and George Kalmus have achieved this."
