= Alan Astbury =

Canadian physicist

Alan Astbury FRS FRSC
- Born: November 27, 1934; Crewe, England
- Died: July 21, 2014 (aged 79)
- Education: University of Liverpool
- Known for: TRIUMF; W particle
- Awards: Rutherford Medal and Prize
- Scientific career
- Fields: Physics
- Workplaces: University of Victoria; * Rutherford Appleton Laboratory
- Website: home.cern/cern-people/obituaries/2014/07/alan-astbury-1934-2014

Alan Astbury FRS FRSC (1934–2014) was a Canadian physicist, emeritus professor at the University of Victoria, and director of the Tri-Universities Meson Facility (TRIUMF) laboratory.

== Early life and education ==
He was born in Crewe, England, to Jane and Harold Astbury. His mother worked in a bakery and his father was an engineer for the Co-op Dairy. He went to Nantwich and Acton Grammar School. Although he was a good cricketer and footballer - he played for Crewe Schoolboys along with Chelsea and England player Frank Blunstone - his parents discouraged a career in football.

== Academic career ==
In 1953, he joined the University of Liverpool, gaining a first-class honours degree in 1956 followed by a PhD in 1959 under Alec Merrison and Hugh Muirhead. He won a Leverhulme Research Fellowship to work on Liverpool's 380 MeV, 1.83m (72 inch) synchrocyclotron, the world's second-largest at the time. The team's work confirmed parity violation in muon capture.

He joined Kenneth Crowe's group at Berkeley in 1961, using their 4.67m (184 inch) synchrocyclotron and working on a bent-crystal spectrometer for more precise particle mass measurement. In 1963, he joined the inchoative Rutherford Appleton Laboratory (RAL) structures, with their 7GeV Nimrod proton synchrotron and eventually became the RAL's Chief Principal Scientific Officer. There, he and others confirmed charge-parity violation in neutral kaon decay. In 1964, the RAL began a two-decade collaboration with Peter Kalmus's group at Queen Mary University of London (QMUL), as well as with groups from Harwell and the University of Bergen amongst others. Experiments were carried out on various weak and strong interactions in the UK and low-energy antiproton-proton experiments at CERN. In 1974, he became the chair of the Nimrod coordinating team, in 1975, the chair of the CERN Electronic Experiments Committee and in 1976 he joined the evaluation committee of Canada's national particle accelerator, TRIUMF.

In 1977, the RAL and QMUL groups, along with John Dowell's group at the University of Birmingham and Muirhead - Astbury's former tutor at Liverpool - joined Carlo Rubbia in the UA1 collaboration at CERN. The Super Proton Synchrotron which had been designed by John Adam was converted under Rubbia's guidance to a collider, the Super Proton–Antiproton Synchrotron. The British contingent created and operated the large hadron calorimeter. Rubbia and Astbury became joint spokespeople for the UA1 project. Later, the existence of the W and Z particles was confirmed, gaining Rubbia and Simon van der Meer the 1984 Nobel Prize in Physics.

Astbury became a professor at the University of Victoria, receiving significant funding for his research. He was joined by researchers from CERN. In 1986, he became a member of the Canadian Natural Sciences and Engineering Research Council (NSERC) grant selection committee and, in 1991, director of Canada's Institute of Particle Physics (IPP). He used his skills when becoming director of TRIUMF in 1994 to further direct Canadian involvement in CERN with contributions to the Large Hadron Collider ATLAS experiment, in addition to the continuing OPAL experiment of the Large Electron–Positron Collider.

He served as president of the International Union of Pure and Applied Physics (IUPAP) from 2005 to 2008. He organised new memberships, instigated the IUPAP Young Scientist Medal and Prize and promoted the increased participation of women in the commissions and executive council.

He died in 2014, survived by his wife, Kathleen (née Stratmeyer), and daughters Elizabeth and Gillian.

== Honours and awards ==
- 2002 CAP Medal for Lifetime Achievement in Physics
- 1986 Rutherford Medal and Prize
- 1988 Elected a Fellow of the Royal Society of Canada (FRSC)
- 1993 Elected a Fellow of the Royal Society (FRS)
