= Research Councils UK =

Non-departmental government body

UK Research Councils
- Abbreviation: RCUK
- Merged into: United Kingdom Research and Innovation
- Formation: 2002; 24 years ago
- Dissolved: 2018; 8 years ago
- Legal status: Non-Departmental Public Body
- Purpose: Funding of UK science research
- Headquarters: Polaris House, North Star Avenue, Swindon, SN2 1ET
- Region served: United Kingdom
- Members: 7 UK Research Councils
- Executive Group Chairman: Prof. Rick Rylance; Chief Executive of AHRC
- Main organ: RCUK Executive Group
- Parent organization: Department for Business, Innovation and Skills
- Affiliations: BBSRC, EPSRC, ESRC, NERC, STFC, TSB, UKSA
- Budget: £3,000m
- Website: www.rcuk.ac.uk

Research Councils UK, sometimes known as RCUK, was a non-departmental public body that coordinated science policy in the United Kingdom from 2002 to 2018. It was an umbrella organisation that coordinated the seven separate research councils that were responsible for funding and coordinating academic research for the arts, humanities, science and engineering. In 2018 Research Councils transitioned into UK Research and Innovation (UKRI).

== Function ==
The role of the RCUK was to:

- Enabling dialogue about research priorities by facilitating an open and collective approach to investing in multidisciplinary research and training
- Facilitating cooperation between the research councils and external stakeholders by promoting dialogue, collaboration, and partnership
- Communicating the activities and views of the research councils to increase policy influence and collective visibility
- Collaborating with academia and other funders to reduce bureaucratic tape for researchers and university administrators
- Improving operational performance by sharing best practices

Each of the research councils is an equal partner in RCUK, and each uses its best endeavours to identify and pursue opportunities for mutually-beneficial joint working with one or more of the other research councils.

== Organisation ==
Each research council is a non-departmental public body incorporated by royal charter. Each is governed by its own governing council comprising a mix of academic and non-academic members, appointed by the Secretary for Innovation, Universities and Skills following a public nomination. The councils receive public funds from the Department for Business, Innovation and Skills, and each reports annually to the British Parliament. In 2008 the combined annual budget was £3.5 billion, of which over £1 billion went to research grants and training at universities. This is one element of the UK's dual system of research funding, the other being block grants provided by the UK Funding Councils for higher education.

Research Council grants support around 50,000 researchers through 18,000 grants at any one time. About 8,000 PhDs are awarded annually as a result of their funding.

The Councils directly employ around 13,000 staff, 9,000 of whom are researchers and technicians at institutes such as the British Antarctic Survey, the Laboratory of Molecular Biology, the Roslin Institute, and the Rutherford Appleton Laboratory. However, in the UK funding system only a few permanent institutes that require permanent infrastructure are directly controlled or core-funded by the Councils. Most funding is allocated competitively and few awards last more than ten years, which allows the Councils to vary capacity to meet changing priorities and challenges.

Research council funding decisions are guided by the Haldane Principle, the idea that decisions are best made by researchers independently from government. Research council funding competitions use open peer review.

== Councils ==
There are seven research councils:

Research council	Formation	Website
Arts and Humanities Research Council	2005	AHRC Website
Biotechnology and Biological Sciences Research Council	1994	BBSRC website
Engineering and Physical Sciences Research Council	1994	EPSRC website
Economic and Social Research Council	1965	ESRC website
Medical Research Council	1913	MRC website
Natural Environment Research Council	1965	NERC website
Science and Technology Facilities Council	2007	STFC website

The MRC's headquarters is in central London and the other six research councils and the RCUK operate from a single complex in Swindon. The research councils also have a joint office in Brussels since 1984—the United Kingdom Research Office (UKRO)—and in 2007 and 2008 established three additional foreign offices in Beijing, China, Washington, DC, and New Delhi, India.

In 2007 the government raised the status of the Technology Strategy Board (TSB) to become, in effect, a research council for industry. This was motivated by a concern that the seven research councils, with their emphasis on academic excellence, were giving insufficient attention to innovation through the application of research findings. The TSB has set up its headquarters next door to the Swindon offices of the research councils. In 2014 the TSB started calling itself Innovate UK, and in 2018 Innovate UK, the research councils and Research England were formally united into UK Research and Innovation (UKRI).

== History ==
Government funding of science in the United Kingdom began in 1675 when the Royal Observatory was established in Greenwich. This trend continued in the 19th century with the creation of the British Geological Survey in 1832, and the allocation of funds in 1850 to the Royal Society to award individual grants.

By the First World War in 1915, claims about the poor state of British manufacturing compared to Germany's led to the Department of Scientific and Industrial Research (DSIR). It was a part of government, staffed by civil servants who distributed grants, operated laboratories, and made policy. Examples included the Radio Research Station, established in Ditton Park in 1924, which later became the Appleton Laboratory.

In 1918 Richard Haldane produced a report on the machinery of government that recommended that government departments undertake more research before making policy and that they should oversee that specific, policy-minded research, while more general research should be governed by autonomous councils free from political pressure. Lord Hailsham dubbed this separation of duties as "the Haldane principle" in 1964 when he was Minister of Science; it has remained a guiding principle ever since.

Following the Haldane Report's recommendations, a Medical Research Council (MRC) was created in 1920 from a previous body called the Medical Research Committee that had been established in 1913 to distribute funds collected under the National Insurance Act 1911. In contrast to DSIR, the MRC was not a government department, its staff were not civil servants, and it concentrated its resources in a small number of central laboratories and a large number of research units associated with universities and hospitals.

In 1931 the Agricultural Research Council was established by incorporating twelve major agricultural research institutes that had been created in England and Wales in 1914.

In 1949 Nature Conservancy was established as a research council in all but name. The National Research Development Corporation (NRDC) was also created to provide financial assistance for the development of inventions.

In 1957 the National Institute for Research in Nuclear Science (NIRNS) was formed to operate the Rutherford High Energy Laboratory, and in 1962 the Daresbury Laboratory.

By 1964 there were 14,150 science and engineering graduates in the UK, up from 7,688 in 1955, and annual civil and military research expenditure had risen from £0.6 million in 1913 to £10 million in 1939 to £76 million in 1964. To respond to this growth, in 1963 Sir Burke Trend chaired the Committee of Enquiry into the Organisation of Civil Science. One major recommendation was that the unwieldy Department of Scientific and Industrial Research (DSIR) should be divided into a Science Research Council, a Natural Resources Research Council (NRDC), and an Industrial Research and Development Authority (IRDA) to address scientific research and industrial innovation, respectively, with the NRDC to be transferred to the Minister of Science's portfolio in order to ensure a smooth transition through the linear model of innovation.

After the national election, the government chose to align scientific research with education in a Department of Education and Science, while industrial innovation was assigned to a Ministry of Technology. This was seen as a barrier between research and innovation, and when he stepped down as Science Minister, Lord Hailsham argued, "Ever since 1915 it has been considered axiomatic that responsibility for industrial research and development is better exercised in conjunction with research in the medical, agricultural and other fields". After 1967 it was relaxed by Solly Zuckerman, who chaired the Cabinet-level Central Advisory Council for Science and Technology and brought the Department of Education and Science and the Ministry of Technology together, but this conflict remains a regular point of contention.

Under the control of the Department of Education and Science, the Science and Technology Act 1965 created both the Science Research Council (SRC) and the Natural Environment Research Council (NERC). The SRC incorporated most of the science part of DSIR, including the Appleton Laboratory, and both the Royal Greenwich Observatory and Royal Observatory Edinburgh, and took control of the Rutherford High Energy Laboratory and the Daresbury Laboratory from NIRNS. NERC incoporporated the Nature Conservancy and British Geological Survey.

Also founded in 1965 was the Social Sciences Research Council (later the ESRC) bringing the number of Research Councils to five—Medicine, Agriculture, Natural Environment, Science, and Social Science—divided by disciplines that were not expected to collaborate.

In 1981, the emphasis in policy on innovation rather than pure science increased so the SRC became the Science and Engineering Research Council (SERC).

In 1983 the ARC also changed its focus to outputs rather than methods to become the Agricultural and Food Research Council (AFRC).

From 1992 the Research Councils reported to the Office of Science and Technology in the Cabinet Office as the making of government departmental policy by the Office of the Chief Scientific Adviser was merged with the making of national science policy by the Science Branch of the Department of Education and Science.

SERC struggled to combine three incompatible business models—administratively efficient short-term grant distribution, medium-term commitments to international agreements, and long-term commitments to staff and facilities. Given a lack of control over exchange rate fluctuations and the need to meet long-term commitments, cuts regularly fell on the short-term grants, thereby alienating the research community.

In 1994 SERC finally split into the EPSRC and PPARC to further separate innovation-orientated engineering from pure research into particle physics and astronomy. In 1995, the CCLRC was spun out of the EPSRC, dividing responsibility for laboratories from those for the allocation of university research grants.

At the same time the biological science activities of SERC were merged with the AFRC to form the Biotechnology and Biological Sciences Research Council (BBSRC).

From 1995 the research councils reported to the Office of Science and Technology in the Department of Trade and Industry as government science policy became more linked to industrial policy.

In 2002 Research Councils UK was created as a secretariat in order to bring together the research councils at a higher level to work together more effectively.

In 2005 the Arts and Humanities Research Council (AHRC) was established in order to bring research funding in the arts and humanities into line with that for other disciplines. It was created from the former Arts and Humanities Research Board, which had been managed by the British Academy since 1998.

From 2006 the research councils reported to the Office of Science and "Innovation" instead of "Technology", as the policy focus switched from technology objects to innovation process, although it was still within the Department of Trade and Industry.

In April 2007 PPARC and CCLRC were combined to form the Science and Technology Facilities Council (STFC) to create a single research council which provides access for UK scientists to national and international research facilities.

From June 2007 the research councils reported to the Department for Innovation, Universities and Skills as the making of innovation policy was merged with the making of policy for universities and skills training, and separated from industrial policy under the Department for Business, Enterprise and Regulatory Reform.

In 2008 RCUK Shared Services Centre Ltd (SSC) was created as a separate company to share administrative duties and cut costs.

From June 2009 the research councils reported to the Department for Business, Innovation and Skills as the making of higher education and innovation policy (from the Department for Innovation, Universities and Skills) was merged back with business policy making (Department for Business, Enterprise and Regulatory Reform).

== See also ==
- Arts and Humanities Research Council
- Biotechnology and Biological Sciences Research Council
- Engineering and Physical Sciences Research Council
- Economic and Social Research Council
- Medical Research Council
- Natural Environment Research Council
- Science and Technology Facilities Council
