= George Kalmus =

British particle physicist (1935–2026)

George Ernest Kalmus, CBE, FRS
- Born: 21 April 1935; Beočin, Yugoslavia
- Died: 27 May 2026 (aged 91)
- Awards: Glazebrook Medal and Prize (2002)
- Scientific career
- Fields: Physics/Particle Physics

George Ernest Kalmus, CBE, FRS (21 April 1935 – 27 May 2026) was a British particle physicist.

== Life and career ==
Kalmus attended St Albans County Grammar School (later renamed Verulam School). He received his BSc (1956) and PhD (1959) at University College London where he remained for a further three years as a research associate. He was later an honorary fellow of University College London.

He was Associate Director (1986–94) and Director of Particle Physics (1994–97) at the Rutherford Appleton Laboratory.

Kalmus was a visiting professor (1984–2000) at the Physics and Astronomy Department at University College London and was made a fellow there in 1998.

He was elected a fellow of the Royal Society in 1988 and awarded a CBE in 2000. Up until his death he was an honorary scientist at the Rutherford Appleton Laboratory

== Personal life and death ==
George Kalmus was married to Ann (died 2021), with whom he had three daughters.

Kalmus died at home on 27 May 2026, aged 91. His brother, Peter Kalmus, is also a British particle physicist. A press release from the Particle Physics and Astronomy Research Council (PPARC) in 2002 commented that "A particle physicist in the family is a rare occurrence. That there should be two and both be leaders of the field is even more unusual, yet Professors Peter and George Kalmus have achieved this".

== Publications ==
Kalmus published numerous articles on experimental particle physics. A listing of many of Kalmus' works can be found in 'INSPIRE' Particle Physics Database and the Science and Technology Facilities Council ePublication Archive.

== Positions ==
- 1959-1962 – Research Associate at University College London.
- 1962-1963 – Research Associate at Lawrence Radiation Laboratory (LRL) University of California, Berkeley.
- 1963-1964 – Lecturer in Physics Department at University College London.
- 1964-1967 – Research Associate at Lawrence Radiation Laboratory, University of California, Berkeley
- 1967-1971 – Senior Physicist at Lawrence Radiation Laboratory University of California.
- 1970-1971 – Sabbatical leave at CERN as visiting scientist
- 1972-1986 – Group Leader, Bubble Chamber Group and DELPHI Group, Rutherford Appleton Laboratory (RAL), England
- 1984 – Visiting professor, Physics Department at University College London.
- 1986-1997 – Director, Particle Physics and Head of Particle Physics Department. Rutherford Appleton Laboratory.
- 1998-2000 – Senior Scientist, Rutherford Appleton Laboratory, on sabbatical leave at CERN
- 2000 – Honorary Scientist, Rutherford Appleton Laboratory

== Professional and science organisations ==
Kalmus served on and contributed to a considerable number of professional and science organisations throughout his career. These included over a decade as the Director and Head of Particle Physics Department of the Rutherford Appleton Laboratory. Kalmus was also an active member of the Lawrence Radiation Laboratory and of CERN and University College London.

He was also a Fellow of the Royal Society and the Institute of Physics was involved with the American Physical Society.

Apart from his duties as Director of Particle Physics at Rutherford Appleton Laboratory, Kalmu served on a number of international committees including:

- Member of the CERN Track Chamber Committee
- Chairman of the BEBC user group at CERN
- Member of the CERN Super Proton Synchrotron Committee
- Member of the Forschungszentrum Karlsruhe Fundamental Physics Advisory Committee
- Chairman of the European High Energy Physics Computing Coordinating Committee
- Member of the Advisory Committee on TRIUMF (2000–2005)
- Member of the CERN Scientific Policy Committee (1990–1996)
- Chairman of the CERN Scientific Policy Committee (1999–2001)
- Member of the DOE/NSF HEPAP Long Range Planning Group (2001)
- Chairman of the ECFA Group on Organisational Matters for an International Linear Collider (2003)
- Member of the ICFA International Technology Review Panel for an International Linear Collider (2004)

== Honours and awards ==
- 1960 – Fellow of the Physical Society (Later the Institute of Physics)
- 1988 – Fellow of the American Physical Society
- 1988 – Fellow of the Royal Society
- 1998 – Fellow of University College London
- 2000 – CBE for services to international particle physics research
- 2002 – Institute of Physics Glazebrook Medal and Prize for leadership and promotion of particle physics in the UK and internationally
