= Quantum Detectors =

UK Synchrotron and university science company

- Company type: Private
- Industry: Synchrotron and university science
- Founded: 2007
- Headquarters: Harwell Science and Innovation Campus, Oxfordshire, UK
- Products: Xspress 3, Zebra, V2F100, Merlin
- Website: www.quantumdetectors.com

Quantum Detectors Limited is a spin-out company from the Diamond Light Source and Science and Technology Facilities Council, although it also commercialises technology from other large scale facilities such as the European Synchrotron Radiation Facility. The function of the company is to take to market developments that would otherwise only be used by the funders of the development; this wider use of these new technologies benefits the scientific community through improved facilities and the developer through aiding them in meeting their impact / knowledge transfer obligations.

Quantum Detectors is based at the Harwell Science and Innovation Campus close to the city of Oxford in the United Kingdom (UK). The company was founded in 2007 and is privately owned by Diamond Light Source Ltd. and The Science and Technology Facilities council commercial arm, STFC Innovations Ltd.

== History ==
Quantum Detectors was originally a spin out from the Synchrotron Radiation Source at Daresbury. The SRS being one of the first synchrotrons used for beamline users, there were few detectors available during its early years, requiring development of new systems for each application where commercial solutions were not available. This led to a number of novel detector systems, some of which were sold by the operator of the SRS to other facilities internationally, such as the ESRF, SPring-8 and the Photon Factory. These detectors included Xspress, XSTRIP and RAPID, updated versions of which can all be found at the Diamond Light Source today.

Given the history of the Detector Group at Daresbury to develop detectors with a demand around the globe, spinning out a company to optimise this process was a logical step. The company was thought up independently a number of times by people in the management at Daresbury, but finally in 2005 the company was incorporated and domain name purchased and in 2007 the project was funded, in mid 2008 it gained the first employee.

Diamond opened in January 2007 and the SRS closed in August 2008, leading to the relocation of Quantum Detectors to Harwell to stay with the UK's Synchrotron Facility. 10% of Quantum Detectors shares were then purchased by Diamond, who then elected a Director to the Quantum Detectors Board. The remaining 90% of the shares belong to STFC.
