= Oxsensis =

British engineering company

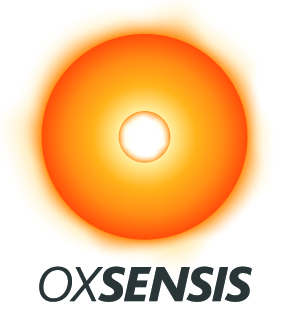
- Company type: Private
- Industry: Power generation and aviation
- Founded: 2003
- Headquarters: Harwell Campus, Oxfordshire, UK
- Key people: Martin Jay CBE, (Chairman); Ian Macafee, (CEO)
- Number of employees: 25 (2017)
- Website: www.oxsensis.com

Oxsensis Ltd. is a British-based engineering business specialising in energy and aerospace equipment.

Oxsensis Ltd. has developed dynamic pressure sensors that operate at temperatures greater than 1,000 °C (1,800 °F). This is a noteworthy technical achievement as existing piezoelectric-based pressure sensors are not capable of operating at temperatures beyond 650 °C (1,200 °F). This achievement can be considered significant for industries such as power generation and aviation. This is because this technology allows manufacturers of gas turbines and jet engines to more closely control the combustion that is taking place in the combustor. The benefits that this offers to operating the gas turbine are increased levels of efficiency and also reduced levels of harmful pollutants such as NOx.

Oxsensis is based at the Harwell Campus close to the city of Oxford in the United Kingdom (UK). The company was founded in 2003 and is privately owned with backing from various venture capital firms.

== History ==
Oxsensis was a spin out using technology from the Central Microstructure Facility at the STFC’s ( Science and Technology Facilities Council) Rutherford Appleton Laboratory in 2003 by, Oxfordshire entrepreneur, David Gahan.

After an initial proof of concept Oxsensis raised £890,000 worth of investment in July 2005 through a funding round. A further round of funding in July 2007 raised £4.36 million. In Aug 2006, Oxsensis was included in a consortium which successfully bid for funding from the European Commission under a Framework Programme (FP6). The EU funded project called HEATTOP was set up with the aim of improving the measurement capabilities within the gas path of a gas turbine. This programme was concluded at the end of 2009.

In Feb 2010, Oxsensis completed a third round of funding which raised £3 million, with the Carbon Trust joining the existing investors to provide this funding. Oxsensis also began working in two publicly funded projects in early 2010. The first one funded by the UK Technology Strategy Board as part of its Carbon Abatement Programme included Siemens Industrial Turbomachinery Ltd and Rolls-Royce PLC within the consortium. The project called FRETSGATE, Fast REsponse Temperature Sensors for GAs Turbine Efficiency, aims to create a fast response temperature sensor for use in gas turbines to enable this equipment to operate on high hydrogen content fuel such as Syngas. The second project funded by the EU Seventh Framework Programme Joint Technology Undertaking Clean Sky, called COTSTEM Ceramic Optical Temperature Sensor for Turbine Engine Measurements, was set up to develop a temperature sensor that could operate close to the turbine inlet of a helicopter gas turbine engine.

In August 2011 Oxsensis won a bid with the UK governments Technology Strategy Board, worth £400,000, to develop down hole sensor technology with GE Measurement and Control Solutions for the Oil and Gas Sector.

In June 2013 Parker Aerospace and Oxsensis agreed to work together to develop optical instrumentation for aircraft fuel tank instrumentation applications.

In August 2013 GE Aviation and Oxsensis agreed to jointly develop an aerospace instrumentation system.

In 2015 Oxsensis achieved AS9100C Quality Management System accreditation, for Aerospace systems.

In 2015 Oxsensis and Centrax Ltd introduced combustion dynamics monitoring products for industrial gas turbines (KB5 and KB7) between 3.5 and 5.5 MW

In 2016 Oxsensis partnered with Rolls-Royce plc in an Aerospace Technology Board engine health monitoring programme (E2EEHM).

In 2016 Oxsensis moved to a new build 7500 sq ft Assembly and Test facility.

== Method of operation ==
The dynamic pressure sensor developed by Oxsensis Ltd, functions as a low finesse Fabry–Pérot cavity which is sensitive to changes in pressure. This cavity is manufactured from sapphire, which has a melting point of 2,053 °C (3,727 °F). Indeed, the Young's modulus of the sapphire retains the required stiffness to allow the Fabry–Pérot cavity to function up to temperatures of around 1,400 °C (2,600 °F). The light that is used to interrogate the cavity is generated in an interrogator unit and passes between this and the sensor via standard silica optical fiber.

== See also ==
- fiber optic sensor
- pressure sensor
- Fabry–Pérot interferometer
- Fiber Bragg grating
- Fiber-optic cable
- Piezoelectric sensor
- List of sensors
- Sensor
- Carbon Trust
