= Council for the Central Laboratory of the Research Councils =

UK government body

CCLRC Logo

The Council for the Central Laboratory of the Research Councils (CCLRC) was a UK government body that carried out civil research in science and engineering.

On 1 April 2007 CCLRC merged with PPARC to form the Science and Technology Facilities Council.

== Activities ==
The CCLRC was created on 1 April 1995 as a non-departmental public body from the laboratories of the previous Science and Engineering Research Council including 1942 staff and an annual turnover of £106 million which had temporarily been controlled by the EPSRC. It operated at three locations:

- Rutherford Appleton Laboratory, near Didcot in Oxfordshire, incorporating the ISIS neutron source
- Daresbury Laboratory. at Daresbury in Cheshire
- Chilbolton Observatory, near Stockbridge in Hampshire

The Diamond Light Source, was developed by the CCLRC at the Rutherford Appleton Laboratory and established as an independent company.

The CCLRC was established:

a) to promote high quality scientific and engineering research by providing facilities and technical expertise in support of basic, strategic and applied research programmes;

b) to support the advancement of knowledge and technology, thereby contributing to the economic competitiveness of Our United Kingdom and the quality of life;

c) to provide advice, disseminate knowledge, and promote public understanding in the fields of science, engineering and technology.

Which in practice meant that it administered the UK's large scale facilities for materials and biomolecular research, laser and space science and alternative energy exploration on behalf of the government, the other UK research funding bodies, universities, and corporate research and development.

Over eighty per cent of the funding for the programmes carried out by the CCLRC came through partnership with other UK Research Councils, whilst the remaining twenty per cent came through partnership with industrial and overseas organisations. Some 10,000 researchers are estimated to have used CLRC's facilities and services each year - usually working in close collaboration with CLRC's support scientists and engineers to get the best from the facilities and expertise available.

As well as operating as a single entity, the Council (CCLRC) also operated its own wholly owned trading subsidiary, Central Laboratory Innovation and Knowledge Transfer Limited (CLIK).

By 2006 annual expenditure had nearly doubled since CCLRC's foundation to £199.8 million as the Council's international role expanded to include the payment of the UK's subscriptions to facilities at the ILL and ESRF.

On 1 April 2007 CCLRC merged with PPARC to form the Science and Technology Facilities Council so that a single organisation was responsible for providing UK scientists with access to large scientific facilities in the UK and elsewhere in the world, including CERN, ESA and ESO.

== Branding ==
Given the wide breadth of its mission there was plenty of room for the CCLRC staff to promote different activities of the Council. Consequently its branding was always a problem.

Between 1994 and 1995 while the laboratories were temporarily operated by the EPSRC, the abbreviation "DRAL" was used to brand them as distinct from the funding Council. When the CCLRC was first established in 1995 the Director General of Research Councils did not want it to be confused with the funding Councils, so he did not want the abbreviation to include the letters "RC" at the end, but to be simply "CCL" - Council of the Central Laboratories. This only lasted for a few months when the accepted abbreviation became "CLRC" - Central Laboratory of the Research Councils. Since the full name included an extra word a confusion was created as to why the abbreviation appeared to be that of a different name than the actual one. To end this confusion, in 2002 the abbreviation was changed to the complete acronym of "CCLRC".

== Chief Executives ==
- 1995–1998 Dr Paul Williams
- 1998–2000 Dr Albert R C Westwood
- 2000–2001 Dr T G Walker OBE
- 2001–2007 Prof John Wood

== See also ==
- Cosener's House, a conference centre run by CCLRC in Abingdon
