= NINA (accelerator) =

Coordinates: 53°20′35″N 2°38′26″W

General properties
- Accelerator type: Synchrotron
- Beam type: Electrons

Beam properties
- Maximum energy: 4–6 GeV

Physical properties
- Location: Daresbury, Warrington, United Kingdom
- Institution: Daresbury Nuclear Physics Laboratory
- Dates of operation: 1964–1977

NINA (National Institute's Northern Accelerator) was a particle accelerator located at Daresbury Laboratory, UK that was used for particle physics and as a source of synchrotron radiation.

== Introduction ==
Given government UK approval in 1962, NINA was a 70.19m, 4 GeV electron synchrotron built in 1964 at the Daresbury Laboratory site in Cheshire, England to study particle physics. This was the first facility at this site and gave birth to the second UK national laboratory (after Rutherford Appleton Laboratory).

NINA was first brought into operation in December 1966, when an energy of 4.5 GeV was achieved. It started regular running in January 1967, for investigations into the targeting and placement of external photon beamlines. In February, the first high energy photon beam was brought into the Manchester experimental area. The Daresbury and Liverpool experimental areas had beams by March/April 1967.

Along with other particle physics accelerators, scientists had been using the synchrotron radiation produced by NINA for its unique properties. By 1975, over 50 scientists with affiliations to more than 16 institutions were at work on NINA exploiting this by product of the particle accelerator. This led to the conversion of the NINA ring into a dedicated source of synchrotron radiation at a cost of £3M at 1974 prices. The particle physics was to be exported to CERN, at the time a proposed 400 GeV machine.

Whilst the majority of NINA was reused onsite for the new Synchrotron Radiation Source (SRS), some parts were repurposed at other facilities, including the 90 ton choke which became a key part of the operation of the ISIS neutron source at the Rutherford Appleton Lab.

== Specifications ==
NINA's design energy was 4 GeV and was reached in 1966. By the time NINA was closed it had been upgraded to 6 GeV. The synchrotron contained 40 electromagnets and initial acceleration was performed by a 40 MeV linac in a tunnel outside the ring.
