= Magdrive =

British space startup

Magdrive Ltd
- Company type: Private
- Industry: Aerospace, space propulsion
- Founded: 2019; 7 years ago
- Founders: Mark Stokes; Thomas Clayson
- Headquarters: Harwell Science and Innovation Campus, Oxfordshire, United Kingdom
- Products: Electric plasma thrusters
- Website: magdrive.space

Magdrive Ltd is a British space technology company headquartered at the Harwell Science and Innovation Campus in Oxfordshire. Founded in 2019 by Mark Stokes (CEO) and Dr Thomas Clayson (CTO), the company develops compact, high-thrust electric plasma propulsion systems for small satellites and spacecraft using solid metal propellant. In June 2025, Magdrive launched its first two thrusters into orbit in collaboration with D-Orbit.

== History ==
Magdrive was founded in 2019 by Mark Stokes and plasma physicist Dr Thomas Clayson, both graduates of Imperial College London. Initially funded by a $2 million pre-seed round led by Founders Fund in 2020, the company has since secured public grants from the UK Government, UK Space Agency, and the European Space Agency.

In February 2025, Magdrive announced a $10.5 million seed funding round led by Redalpine, with participation from Founders Fund, Balerion Space Ventures, Alumni Ventures, Outsized Ventures, Entrepreneur First, and 7percent Ventures. As of early 2025, the company had raised approximately $22.5 million in total, including public funding.

== Technology ==
Magdrive’s propulsion systems use solid metal propellant and onboard energy storage to generate high-energy plasma, achieving thrust levels significantly greater than traditional electric propulsion systems of similar size. The company's Rogue thruster, designed to fit within a CubeSat form factor (~2.5 kg dry mass), produces thrust in the range of tens of millinewtons. It is intended for satellite constellation management, in-space servicing, and space debris avoidance.

An in-orbit demonstration of the Rogue thruster—part of the "Going Rogue" mission—was launched in June 2025 aboard a SpaceX Falcon 9 Transporter-14 rideshare mission, in partnership with D-Orbit.

== Missions ==
| Year | Partner | Launch vehicle | Description |
|---|---|---|---|
| 2023 | EnduroSat | Falcon 9 (Transporter-6) | First in-orbit experiment; technology demonstration of Magdrive’s plasma propulsion in microgravity. |
| 2025 | D-Orbit | Falcon 9 (Transporter-14) | First full-scale in-orbit test of the Rogue thruster during the “Going Rogue” mission. |

== See also ==
- Electric propulsion
- CubeSat
- Spacecraft propulsion
- Satellite constellation
