= Science and Engineering Research Council =

Defunct UK science agency

- Abbreviation: SERC
- Predecessor: Science Research Council (SRC)
- Successor: Engineering and Physical Sciences Research Council (EPSRC)
- Formation: 1981
- Dissolved: 1991
- Type: Non-departmental public body
- Purpose: Funding of science and engineering research

The Science and Engineering Research Council (SERC) and its predecessor the Science Research Council (SRC) were the UK agencies in charge of publicly funded scientific and engineering research activities, including astronomy, biotechnology and biological sciences, space research and particle physics, between 1965 and 1994.

== History ==
The SERC also had oversight of:

- the Royal Greenwich Observatory (RGO)
- the Royal Observatory Edinburgh (ROE)
- the Rutherford Appleton Laboratory (RAL)
- the Daresbury Laboratory

From its formation in 1965 until 1981 it was known as the Science Research Council (SRC). The SRC had been formed in 1965 as a result of the Trend Committee enquiry into the organisation of civil science in the UK. Previously the Minister for Science had been responsible for various research activities in the Department of Scientific and Industrial Research (DSIR) and more loosely with a variety of agencies concerned with the formulation of civil scientific policy. One of the main problems addressed by the enquiry was how to decide the priorities for government funding across all areas of scientific research. Previously this task had been the responsibility of the Treasury without direct scientific advice. The other Research Councils formed in 1965 were:

1. the Natural Environment Research Council (NERC)
2. the Social Science Research Council (SSRC)
3. the Agricultural Research Council (ARC)

These bodies joined the Medical Research Council (MRC) which had existed since 1920. In 1981, to reflect the increased emphasis on engineering research, the SRC was renamed the Science and Engineering Research Council. In 1994, the new Director General of Research Councils was charged with reorganization of the four existing research councils, and this resulted in the SERC being split three bodies:

1. the Particle Physics and Astronomy Research Council (PPARC)
2. the Engineering and Physical Sciences Research Council (EPSRC)
3. the Biotechnology and Biological Sciences Research Council (BBSRC)

The two Observatories were moved under the aegis of PPARC, and the Laboratories initially into EPSRC and later into their own organization, the Council for the Central Laboratory of the Research Councils (CCLRC).

In 2007 CCLRC and PPARC were merged to form the Science and Technology Facilities Council (STFC), with responsibility for nuclear physics being transferred from EPSRC to STFC.

== See also ==
- ORRF Risk Research Forum
- Packet switching § SRCnet/SERCnet
