= Atlas Computer Laboratory =

Computer laboratory in England

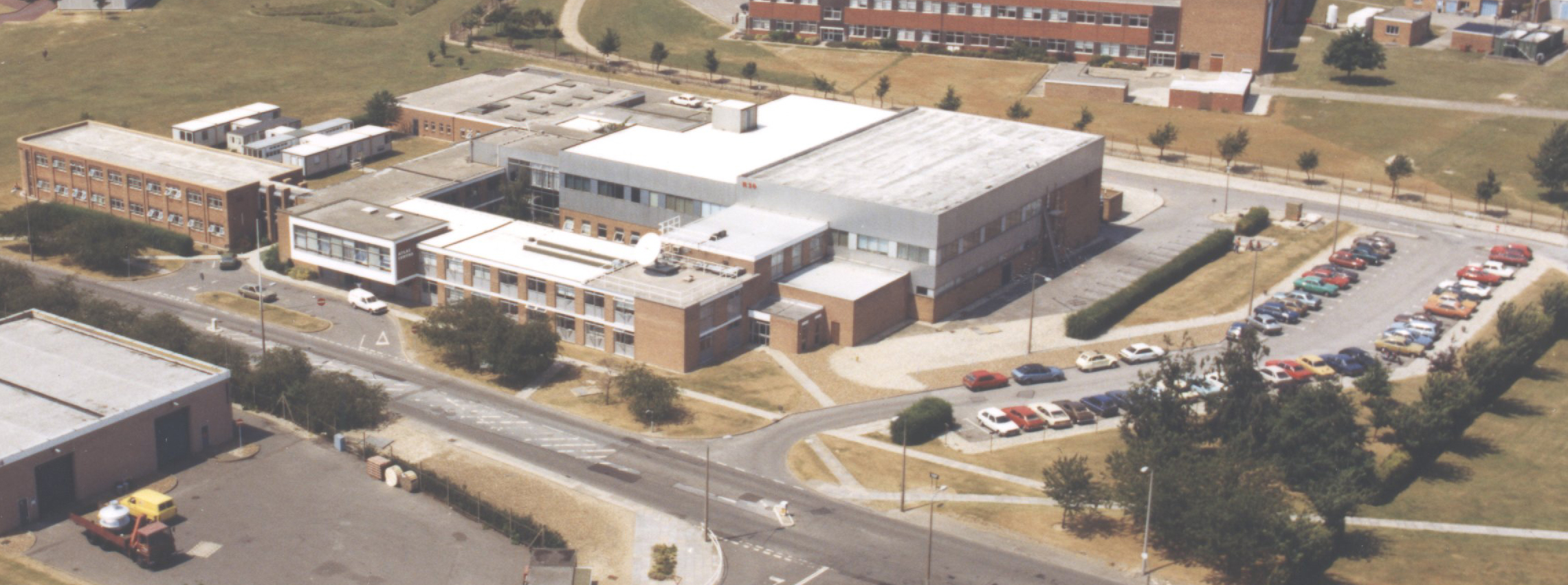
- The Atlas Computer Laboratory was for many years a major facility supporting computationally intensive science and engineering research in the UK.

- Location within Oxfordshire
- Established: 1961
- Dissolved: 1975
- Location: Harwell, Oxfordshire
- Coordinates: 51.5752°N 1.3150°W
- Director: Jack Howlett
- Website: http://www.chilton-computing.org.uk/

The Atlas Computer Laboratory on the Harwell, Oxfordshire campus shared by the Harwell Laboratory was one of the major computer laboratories in the world, which operated between 1961 and 1975 to provide a service to British scientists at a time when powerful computers were not usually available. The main user population was the UK universities and some government agencies.

Now called the Atlas centre, it is home to European Space Agency's (ESA) Business Incubation Centre (ESA BIC), and the Science and Technology Facilities Council's (STFC) Innovations Technology Access Centre (I-TAC).

== History ==
From 1964 to 1971, the laboratory housed the largest of the three examples of the Ferranti Atlas 1 computer that was purchased for £2.5 million, and after which the laboratory was named. For a time, it was the fastest of the computers available worldwide.

Throughout its life, it was headed by Jack Howlett. Early staff or visitors included A. O. L. Atkin (1964–1970), I. J. Good (1964–1967), and Donald Michie who had worked together at Bletchley Park during the Second World War.

Text and graphical output on both paper and film was provided by a Stromberg-Carlson SC4020 microfilm recorder of which was used for computer animation. Associated with the SC4020 was a PDP15 satellite computer that provided previewing facilities for the SC4020 and a range of interactive graphics facilities for users.

From 1971, an ICL 1906A was installed with twice the computing power of the Atlas 1. About the same time, work started on replacing the ageing SC4020 with a modern III FR80 microfilm recorder which expanded the range of output media to include microfiche and was able to generate colour as well as black and white output.

From 1967 until 1985, several of the earliest computed generated image (CGI) or computer animated films were produced at the laboratory, particularly for the Open University. Most famously, the laboratory's facilities were used to produce the raster wireframe model rendering shown on the navigation monitors in the landing sequence of the 1979 Ridley Scott film Alien which won the 1979 Academy Award for Best Visual Effects.

The Atlas Computer Laboratory made important contributions to systems software including operating systems, compilers, computer graphics, and networking. Basic software in the areas of statistics, mathematics, linguistics, chemistry and many other areas was also developed.

In 1975, the Atlas Computer Laboratory was closed, moving some parts to the Daresbury Laboratory and amalgamating the rest with the neighbouring Rutherford High Energy Laboratory, and then in 1979 with the Appleton Laboratory to form the Rutherford Appleton Laboratory. Since 2007, the Rutherford Appleton Laboratory has been operated by the Science and Technology Facilities Council.

In July 2009, The European Space Agency Business Incubation Centre Harwell (ESA BIC Harwell) moved into the Atlas building, now named the Atlas Centre. ESA BIC Harwell supports small and medium businesses that use space technology for everyday applications to develop their products and expand their companies. Also staff of ESA's European Centre for Space Applications and Telecommunications (ECSAT) were housed in the Atlas building between 2009 and September 2015, before the team moved into a dedicated building.

The building is also home to The Science and Technology Facilities Council's (STFC) Innovations Technology Access Centre (I-TAC) and RAL space robotics division where the team is developing autonomous robotic platforms that can be used both for space and terrestrial applications.
