= ISIS Neutron and Muon Source =

Research facility in Oxfordshire, England

Coordinates: 51°34′18″N 1°19′12″W

ISIS Neutron and Muon Source
- Location: Rutherford Appleton Laboratory, Didcot, Oxfordshire, England
- Scientific Purpose: Supports national and international community of around 3000 scientists who use neutrons and muons for research in physics, chemistry, materials science, engineering, biology and more.
- Organisation: Owned and operated by the Science and Technology Facilities Council part of United Kingdom Research and Innovation.
- Website: isis.stfc.ac.uk

The ISIS Neutron and Muon Source is a pulsed neutron and muon source at the Rutherford Appleton Laboratory (RAL) of the Science and Technology Facilities Council (STFC), on the Harwell Science and Innovation Campus at Didcot in Oxfordshire, England. It has been operating since 1984. It uses beams of neutrons and muons to allow the study of materials at the atomic and molecular level. It has a suite of 35 instruments, each of which is individually optimised to investigate different aspects of atomic- and molecular-level properties. The research conducted at ISIS plays an important role in addressing global challenges, answering fundamental questions, and delivering scientific and socio-economic impact.

Hundreds of experiments are performed every year at the facility by industrial and academic researchers from around the world, in diverse science areas such as clean energy, advanced manufacturing, quantum computing, healthcare, agriculture and archaeology.

== Background physics ==
Neutrons are uncharged constituents of atoms and penetrate matter well, deflecting primarily from atomic nuclei. The statistical accumulation of deflected neutrons at different positions beyond the sample can be used to find the atomic structure of a material, and the loss or gain of energy by neutrons can reveal atomic-level dynamics, for example ionic diffusive processes in solids. They are good at studying where atoms are and what atoms are doing.

At ISIS, the neutrons are created by accelerating "bunches" of protons in a synchrotron, then colliding these with a tungsten target. The impacts cause neutrons to spall off the tungsten atoms, and the neutrons are channelled through guides, or beamlines, to around 30 neutron instruments. The target stations and most of the instruments are set inside two large halls known as target stations.

Since the proton beam is pulsed, the energy of the neutrons that are produced can be determined by time-of-flight (TOF) techniques – this is a key bit of information needed to study atomic-level structures and dynamics.

ISIS is one of several proton accelerator-based neutron sources in the world, alongside J-PARC in Japan, SNS in the US, the CSNS in China and the European Spallation Source currently under construction in Sweden.

ISIS Neutron and Muon Source produces muons by colliding a fraction of the proton beam with a graphite target, producing pions which decay rapidly into muons, delivered in a spin-polarised beam to the muon instruments – ISIS has 7 different muon experiment areas, five of which are normally in use.

ISIS was approved in 1977 for the RAL site on the Harwell campus and used recycled components from earlier UK science programs, including the accelerator hall, which had previously been occupied by the Nimrod accelerator. The first neutron beam was produced in 1984, and the facility was formally opened by the then Prime Minister Margaret Thatcher in October 1985.

The name ISIS is not an acronym: it refers to the Ancient Egyptian goddess and the local name for the River Thames. The name was chosen for the official opening of the facility in 1985; before this it was known as the SNS, or Spallation Neutron Source. The name was considered appropriate as Isis was a deity who could restore life to the dead, and ISIS made use of equipment previously constructed for the Nimrod and NINA accelerators.

The second target station (TS2) was given funding in 2003 by Lord Sainsbury, then science minister, and was completed on time and budget, with first neutrons delivered to seven instruments on 2 August 2008. In March 2011, the Science Minister, David Willetts, gave a £21 million investment to build four further instruments. TS2 uses lower-energy neutrons to study soft condensed matter, biological systems, advanced composites and nanomaterials.

In 2023, £90 million of funding was announced for the Endeavour programme that, over the subsequent decade, will bring two new instruments to the facility, as well as six significant upgrades to existing instruments. The build of these instruments began in 2025, with the first planned to begin operations in 2028.

ISIS Neutron and Muon Source was originally expected to have an operational life of 20 years (1985–2005), but its continued success has led to a process of refurbishment and further investment, intended to advance the facility and extend the life of ISIS beyond 2040.

== Science ==
ISIS Neutron and Muon Source is administered and operated by the Science and Technology Facilities Council (previously CCLRC). The Science and Technology Facilities council, or STFC, is part of UK Research and Innovation. Experimental time is open to academic users from anywhere in the world and is applied for through a number of different access routes, most commonly a twice-yearly "call for proposals". Research allocation, or "beamtime", is then allocated to applicants via a peer-review process. Academic users and their parent institutions do not pay for the running costs of the facility, which are as much as £20,000 per instrument per day. Most users stay in Ridgeway House, a hotel on the same campus, or at The Cosener's House, an STFC-run conference centre in Abingdon. Over 1000 experiments by 1600 users are completed every year, resulting in 500 – 600 academic publications annually.

ISIS also has a range of access mechanisms open to businesses, which include proprietary access, partnerships with academia and the ISIS Collaborative Research and Development (ICRD) Programme, which is specifically geared towards the needs of industrial partners.

Over 500 staff work at ISIS, operating the facility, supporting user experiments and carrying out research. The main control room is staffed 24 hours a day, every day of the year. Instrument scientists oversee the running of each instrument and liaise with users, and other divisions provide sample environment, data analysis and computing expertise, maintain the accelerator, and run education programmes. ISIS has biological, materials characterisation and deuteration laboratories and a cryogenics team that runs a helium recovery facility.

Among the important and pioneering work carried out at ISIS was the discovery of the structure of high-temperature superconductors and the solid phase of buckminsterfullerene. More recently there has been a growth in experiments relating to clean energy, such as batteries, and health and life sciences, such as bacterial membranes and lipid nanoparticles. Other recent scientific highlights can be found on the ISIS website.

The synchrotron itself hosted the International Muon Ionization Cooling Experiment (MICE) for parasitic running from 2008 to 2018. MICE replaced the earlier HEP Test Beam.

== Capabilities ==
Neutrons and muons have unique capabilities that make them particularly well suited for materials characterisation.

- Both neutrons and muons are non-destructive probes suitable for characterising delicate and precious samples.
- Neutrons can penetrate samples, even when contained within complex sample environments.
- Neutrons are sensitive to different isotopes of the same element, so isotopic substitution can be used to highlight specific structural features.
- The neutron scattering power of nuclei varies randomly such that lighter atoms such as hydrogen and lithium can be studied in the presence of heavier ones.
- Sophisticated sample environments enable neutron and muon measurements under realistic operating conditions - including extreme temperatures and pressures.
- Neutron and muon techniques are also highly complementary to each other and to other methods, including synchrotron X-ray diffraction.

== Techniques ==
The instruments at ISIS employ a range of muon and neutron scattering techniques to enable the study of a broad range of materials.

- Neutron diffraction instruments are used to provide detailed insights into the arrangement of atoms within a material, helping scientists to understand its properties and behaviour. Neutron diffraction can be applied to study crystalline solids, gasses, liquids or amorphous materials.
- Neutron imaging provides neutron radiography, tomography, strain scanning and texture analysis capabilities, designed for a broad range of materials science areas where non‑destructive and in-situ testing is required.
- Neutron reflectometry. Reflectivity is the ratio of the reflected intensity to the incident intensity for a beam directed onto an interface or surface. The technique of neutron reflectometry provides valuable information over a wide variety of scientific and technological applications including polymer and surfactant adsorption, structure of thin film magnetic systems, and biological membranes.
- Neutron spectroscopy measures the change in the energy of the neutron as it scatters off a sample and can be used to probe a variety of phenomena such as the motions of atoms, rotational modes of molecules, magnetic and quantum excitations and even electronic transitions.
- Small-angle neutron scattering (SANS) is a technique for examining bulk materials at length scales ranging from 0.5 nanometres to several hundred nanometres.
- Elemental analysis using neutrons or muons determines, qualitatively and/or quantitatively, the elemental/isotopic composition and spatial 2D/3D distribution in a material.
- Irradiation looks at how samples, such as electronics, respond to cosmic neutron radiation.
- Muon spectroscopy provides a probe of materials at an atomic level.

== Neutron and muon instruments ==
The instruments currently at ISIS Neutron and Muon Source are:

=== Target Station 1 ===
- ALF is a crystal alignment facility.
- Engin-X is a neutron diffractometer optimised for the measurement of strain, and thus stress, deep within a crystalline material.
- GEM is a neutron diffractometer that can perform high-intensity, high-resolution experiments to study the structure of disordered materials and crystalline powders.
- HRPD is a neutron diffractometer which is one of the highest-resolution neutron powder diffractometers of its type in the world.
- Ines is a neutron powder diffractometer, built and managed by the Italian National Research Council (CNR) within the cooperation agreement with STFC.
- Iris is a neutron spectrometer, designed for quasi-elastic and low-energy high-resolution inelastic spectroscopy.
- LoQ is a small-angle neutron scattering instrument used to investigate the shape and size of large molecules, small particles, or porous materials with dimensions typically in the range of 1–100 nm.
- Maps is a neutron spectrometer, primarily designed to tackle magnetic and structural excitations in single crystals.
- Mari is a neutron spectrometer, ideal for the study of phonon densities of states in crystalline and disordered systems, and crystal field excitations in magnetic materials.
- Merlin is a neutron spectrometer with a high-count-rate, medium-energy-resolution, direct-geometry chopper spectrometer.
- Osiris can be used as a neutron spectrometer or diffractometer. It is optimised for very low-energy studies and long-wavelength diffraction.
- Pearl is a neutron diffractometer dedicated to high-pressure powder diffraction.
- Polaris is a neutron diffractometer optimised for the rapid characterisation of structures, the study of small amounts of materials, the collection of data sets in rapid time, and the studies of materials under non-ambient conditions.
- SANDALS is a neutron diffractometer especially built for investigating the structure of liquids and amorphous materials.
- Surf is a neutron reflectometer and one of the leading instruments in the world for liquid interface research.
- SXD is a neutron diffractometer which is powerful in applications involving surveys of reciprocal space, such as phase transitions and incommensurate structures, and also in applications where sample orientation may be restricted.
- Tosca is a neutron spectrometer optimised for the study of molecular vibrations in the solid state.
- Vesuvio is a neutron spectrometer which uses the high intensity of neutrons in the eV energy range (epi-thermal neutrons) to mass-separate the spectra into a collection of nuclear momentum distributions.

Muon experimental areas

- EMU is a μSR spectrometer, optimised for zero-field and longitudinal-field measurements.
- MuSR is a μSR spectrometer which can be rotated through 90 degrees to enable both longitudinal and transverse measurements to be made.
- HiFi is a high-field muon instrument that provides applied longitudinal fields up to 5T.
- Argus is a muon spectrometer for condensed matter and molecular studies.
- Chronus is a muon instrument on the Japanese-owned RIKEN-RAL Muon Facility.
- MuX uses negative muons for elemental analysis.

=== Target Station 2 ===
- ChipIr is a chip irradiation instrument dedicated to the irradiation of microelectronics with atmospheric-like neutrons.
- IMAT is a neutron imaging and diffraction instrument for materials science, materials processing, and engineering.
- Inter is a high-intensity chemical interfaces reflectometer offering a unique facility for the study of a range of air/liquid, liquid/liquid, air/solid, and liquid/solid interfaces.
- Larmor is a flexible, small-angle neutron scattering instrument that has been optimised for the development of new neutron scattering techniques which use the Larmor precession of neutrons to encode energy or direction.
- LET is a neutron spectrometer optimised for the study of dynamics in condensed matter to understand the microscopic origin of material properties.
- Nile provides well-characterised mono-energetic neutron beams for irradiation, including 2.5 MeV and 14 MeV neutrons from DD and DT generators.
- NIMROD is a neutron diffractometer designed to access length scales ranging from the interatomic (< 1 Å) through to the mesoscopic (>300 Å).
- OffSpec is a neutron reflectometer that gives access to nanometre length scales parallel and perpendicular to interfaces.
- PolRef is a neutron reflectometer designed for the study of the magnetic ordering in and between the layers and surfaces of thin-film materials.
- SANS2D is a small-angle neutron scattering instrument that can be used to examine size, shape, internal structure, and spatial arrangement in nanomaterials, "soft matter", and colloidal systems, including those of biological origin, on length scales of 0.25–300 nm.
- WISH is a neutron diffractometer designed for powder diffraction at long d-spacing in magnetic and large-unit-cell systems, with the option of enabling single-crystal and polarised-beam experiments.
- Zoom is a flexible, high-count-rate small-angle scattering instrument.

== In popular culture ==
The final episode of series 1 of the Sparticle Mystery was filmed on site. The site is also referenced in the book Itch Rocks.
