= Compact Linear Accelerator for Research and Applications =

Science facility

Compact Linear Accelerator for Research and Applications (CLARA)
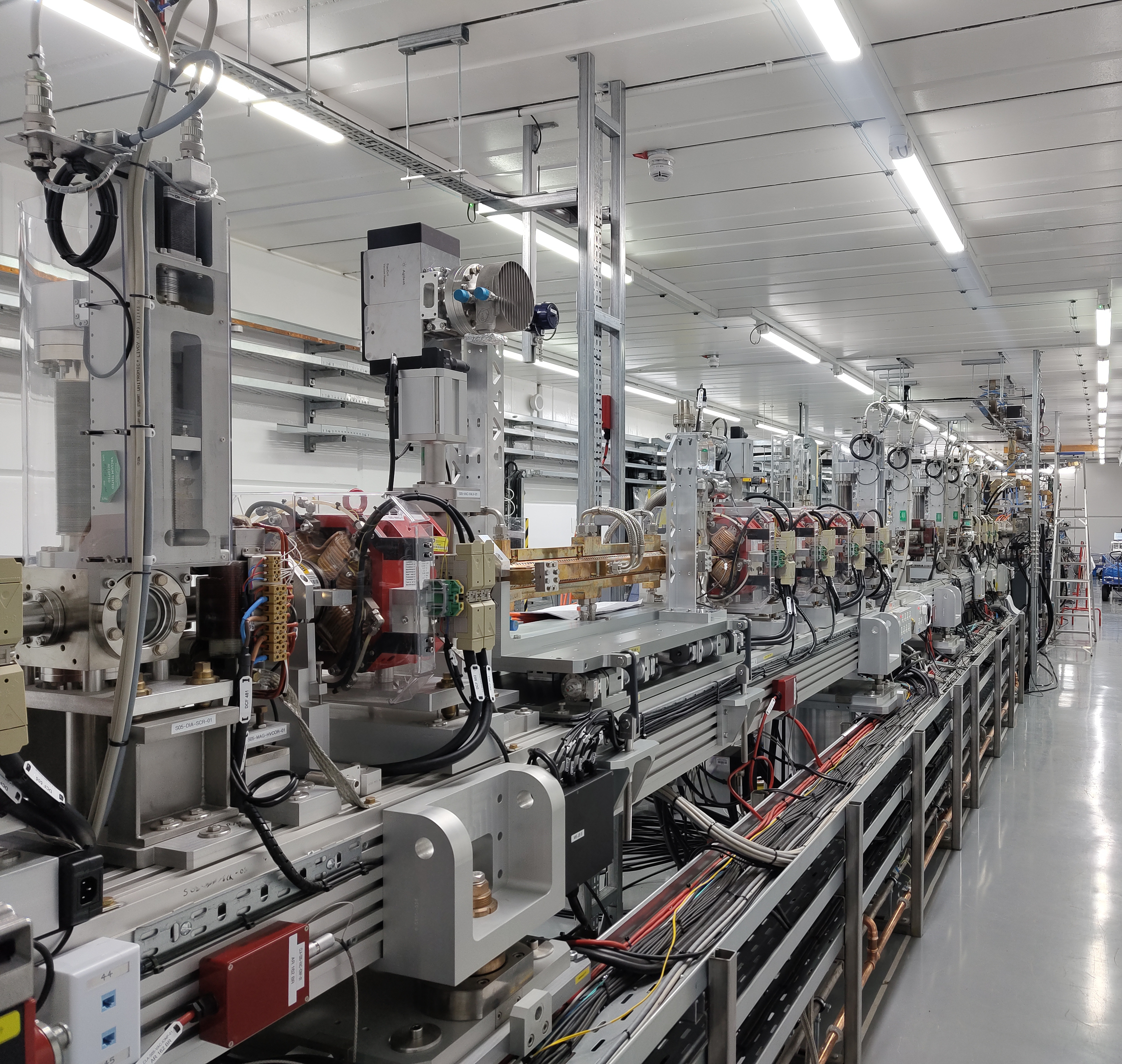
- Phase 1 of the CLARA accelerator situated at Daresbury Laboratory

General properties
- Accelerator type: Linear accelerator
- Beam type: Electrons

Beam properties
- Maximum energy: 250 MeV
- Maximum current: 400 A
- Maximum brightness: >1x10¹² W/m²/sr

Physical properties
- Length: 90 m
- Location: Cheshire, United Kingdom
- Coordinates: 53.342927°N 2.640675°W
- Institution: Daresbury Laboratory
- Dates of operation: 2016 - present

The Compact Linear Accelerator for Research and Applications (CLARA) is a scientific user facility at Daresbury Laboratory. It is an electron linear accelerator (linac) currently under construction in the Electron Hall.

CLARA is made up of three phases; Phase 1 is operational and has achieved energies of 50 MeV with bunch charges >250 pC. Phase 2 was constructed off-line and consists of three linacs delivering a total design energy of up to 250 MeV, 250 pC beam charge at 100 Hz repetition rate. On 2 April 2025, CLARA achieved the full design energy of 250 MeV through Phase 2, at a bunch charge of 60 pC. Phase 2 also consists of the Full Energy Beam Exploitation (FEBE) arc, a beamline which looks at plasma-wakefield acceleration, boosting the beam to energies of around 2 GeV for high energy experimentation. Phase 3 is future expansion for X-ray Free Electron Laser (X-FEL) construction. This 100 nm X-FEL is linked to the UK XFEL project.

== History ==
After beginning its decommission process in 2008, the Synchrotron Radiation Source (SRS) left space for construction of a new accelerator in the Electron Hall and Outer Hall. The booster ring bunker was taken down and replaced by a small electron beam facility and the linac bunker was repurposed into a linac test facility (LTF).

Several SRS end stations and beamlines were previously situated in the Electron Hall and in late 2011, construction began on the Electron Beam Test Facility (EBTF). The bunker was constructed between mid 2011 and mid 2012, and the beamline and accelerator components were installed in late 2012. By 2013, the EBTF became the Versatile Electron Linear Accelerator (VELA) and a conceptual design report for CLARA was released in July 2013. VELA was commissioned in 2013 and provided high-quality electron beams for several industrial and academic user groups.

In 2015 it was announced that CLARA was to be installed as part of the VELA beamline, sharing the same RF and laser infrastructure.

In 2016 work began on CLARA, with the gun end situated where the SRS booster-to-storage transfer line occupied, for the rest of the accelerator to span the length of the hall. Phase 1 was commissioned in 2017 and provided, along with VELA, high energy electron beams for scientific research. CLARA's first beam was achieved on 16 November 2017 with an energy of 48 MeV/c.

On 2 April 2025, CLARA achieved its full design energy of 250 MeV. This beam was generated in high repetition rate mode at 100 Hz through linacs 2, 3 and 4, with a bunch charge of 60 pC measured on multiple Faraday cups.

== Properties ==
CLARA is 90 m long, consists of 4 linacs, and the electron momentum varies across its length. Linac 1 is ~35 MeV/c, linac 2 is ~125 MeV/c, linac 3 is ~200 MeV/c, the 4th harmonic cavity is ~180 MeV/c and linac 4 is ~250 MeV/c. Each linac has its own high power klystron and modulator situated in rooms directly above.

CLARA has several operating modes;

CLARA operating modes
	Mode			
Parameter	Flat – Seeded Harmonic Generation	Ultrashort – Single Spike SASE	Short – High- Brightness SASE	Long – Mode Locked
Energy	240 MeV	240 MeV	150 - 240 MeV	150 - 240 MeV
Pulse Duration	250 fs flat region	50 - 35 fs FWHM	585 fs FWHM	1.875 ps FWHM
Charge	250 pC	25 - 50 pC	250 pC	250 pC
Peak Current	400 A	500 - 1500 A	400 A	125 A
Norm Emittance (mm-mrad)	0.5 (Target) 1.0 (Max)	1.0 (Target) 1.5 (Max)	0.5 (Target) 1.0 (Max)	0.5 (Target) 0.8 (Max)
RMS Energy Spread (keV)	25 (Target) 100 (Max)	100 (Target) 150 (Max)	25 (Target) 120 (Max)	25 (Target) 75 (Max)
