= Diamond Light Source =

Scientific facility in Oxfordshire, England

Coordinates: 51°34′28″N 1°18′39″W

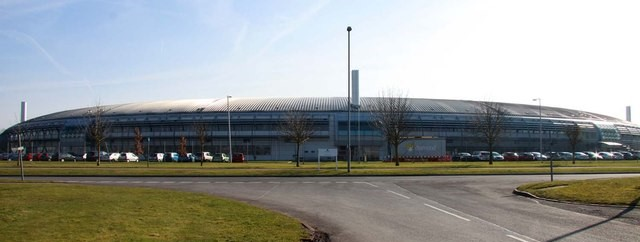
- Diamond Light Source building
- Established: 2001
- Laboratory type: National scientific research laboratory
- Location: Chilton, Oxfordshire, England
- Website: www.diamond.ac.uk

Map
- Location within Oxfordshire

Diamond Light Source (or just Diamond) is the UK's national synchrotron light source science facility located at the Harwell Science and Innovation Campus in Oxfordshire.

Its purpose is to produce intense beams of light whose special characteristics are useful in many areas of scientific research. In particular it can be used to investigate the structure and properties of a wide range of materials from proteins (to provide information for designing new and better drugs), and engineering components (such as a fan blade from an aero-engine) to conservation of archeological artifacts (for example Henry VIII's flagship the Mary Rose).

There are more than 50 light sources across the world. With an energy of 3 GeV, Diamond is a medium energy synchrotron currently operating with 32 beamlines.

== Design, construction and finance ==
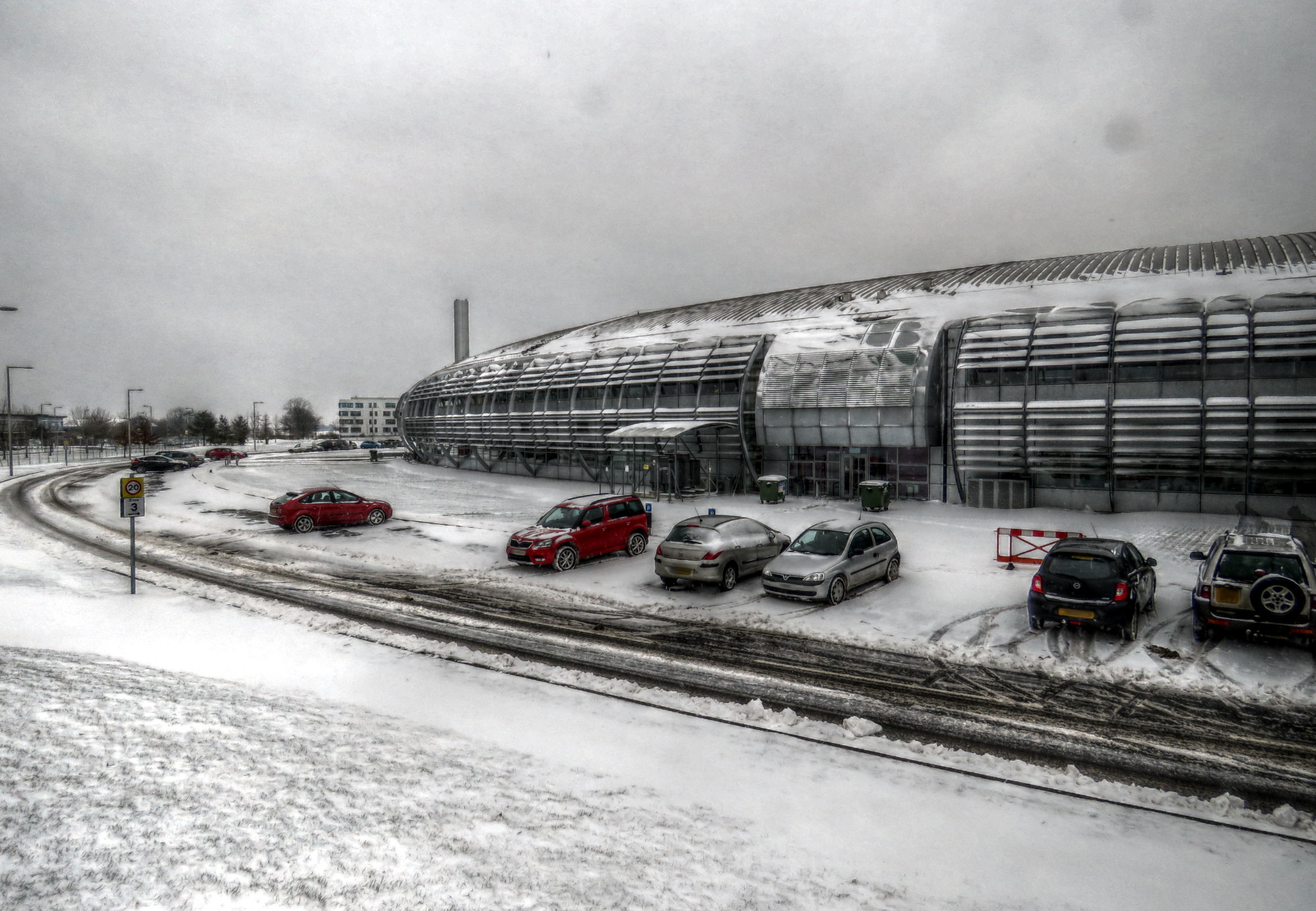
Diamond Light Source in snow, 2018.

The Diamond synchrotron is the largest UK-funded scientific facility to be built in the UK since the Nimrod proton synchrotron which was sited at the Rutherford Appleton Laboratory in 1964. Nearby facilities include the ISIS Neutron and Muon Source, the Central Laser Facility, and the laboratories at Harwell and Culham (including the Joint European Torus (JET) project). It replaced the Synchrotron Radiation Source, a second-generation synchrotron at the Daresbury Laboratory in Cheshire.

Diamond produced its first user beam towards the end of January 2007, and was formally opened by Queen Elizabeth II on 19 October 2007.

=== Construction ===
A design study during the 1990s was completed in 2001 by scientists at Daresbury and construction began following the creation of the operating company, Diamond Light Source Ltd.

The construction costs of £260m covered the synchrotron building, the accelerators inside it, the first seven experimental stations (beamlines) and the adjacent office block, Diamond House.

=== Governance ===
The facility is operated by Diamond Light Source Ltd, a joint venture company established in March 2002. The company receives 86% of its funding from the UK Government via the Science and Technology Facilities Council (STFC) and 14% from the Wellcome Trust.

== Synchrotron ==
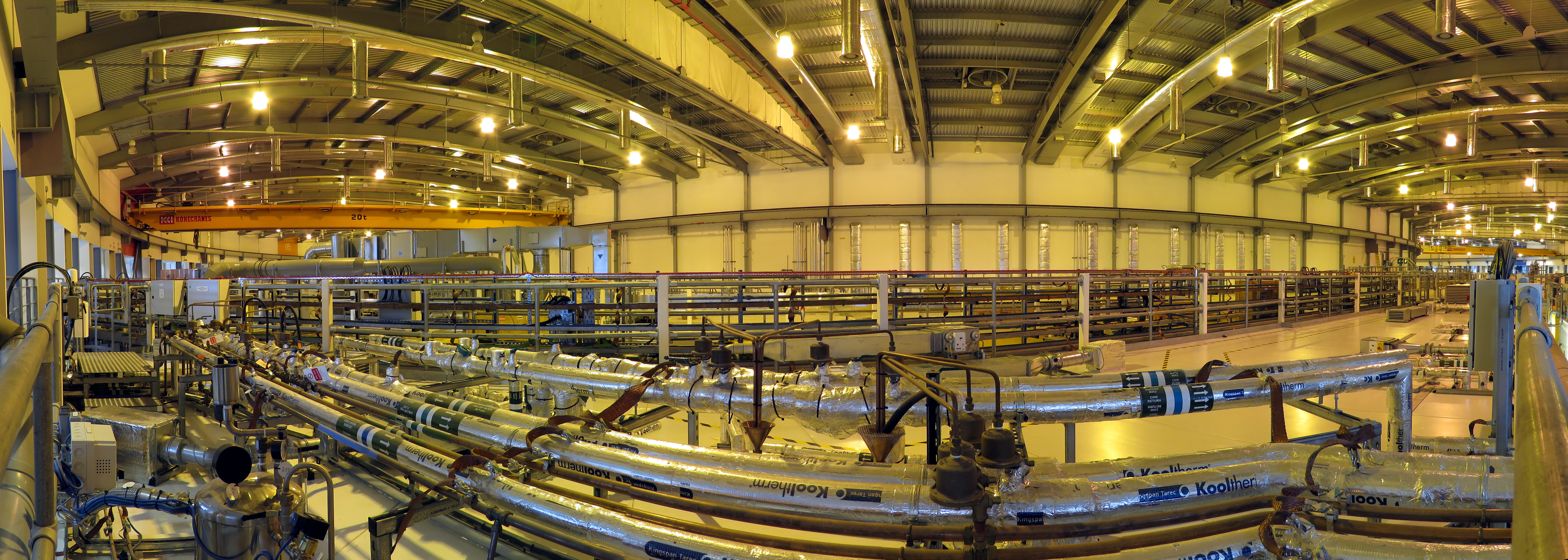
Inside the experimental hall

Diamond generates synchrotron light at wavelengths ranging from X-rays to the far infrared. This is also known as synchrotron radiation and is the electromagnetic radiation emitted by charged particles travelling near the speed of light when their path deviates from a straight line. It is used in a huge variety of experiments to study the structure and behaviour of many different types of matter.

The particles Diamond uses are electrons travelling at an energy of 3 GeV round a 561.6 m (1,843 ft) circumference storage ring. This is not a true circle, but a 48-sided polygon with a bending magnet at each vertex and straight sections in between. The bending magnets are dipole magnets whose magnetic field deflects the electrons so as to steer them around the ring. As Diamond is a third generation light source it also uses special arrays of magnets called insertion devices. These cause the electrons to undulate and it is their sudden change of direction that causes the electrons to emit an exceptionally bright beam of electromagnetic radiation, brighter than that of a single bend when traveling through a bending magnet. This is the synchrotron light used for experiments. Some beamlines, however, use light solely from a bending magnet without the need of an insertion device.

The electrons reach this high energy via a series of pre-accelerator stages before being injected into the 3 GeV storage ring:

- an electron gun – 90 keV
- a 100 MeV linear accelerator
- a 100 MeV – 3 GeV booster synchrotron – 158 m (518 ft) in circumference

The Diamond synchrotron is housed in a silver toroidal building of 738 m (2,421 ft) in circumference, covering an area in excess of 43,300 m^{2} (466,000 sq ft), or the area of over six football pitches. This contains the storage ring and a number of beamlines, with the linear accelerator and booster synchrotron housed in the centre of the ring. These beamlines are the experimental stations where the synchrotron light's interaction with matter is used for research purposes. Seven beamlines were available when Diamond became operational in 2007, with more coming online as construction continued. As of April 2019 there were 32 beamlines in operation. Diamond is intended ultimately to host about 33 beamlines, supporting the life, physical and environmental sciences.

Diamond is also home to eleven electron microscopes. Nine of these are cryo-electron microscopes specialising in life sciences including two provided for industry use in partnership with Thermo Fisher Scientific; the remaining two microscopes are dedicated to research of advanced materials.

== Case studies ==
- In September 2007, scientists from Cardiff University led by Tim Wess, found that the Diamond synchrotron could be used to see hidden content of ancient documents by illumination without opening them (penetrating layers of parchment).
- In November 2010 data collected at Diamond by Imperial College London formed the basis for a paper in the journal Nature advancing the understanding of how HIV and other retroviruses infect human and animal cells. The findings may enable improvements in gene therapy to correct gene malfunctions.
- In June 2011 data from Diamond led to an article in the journal Nature detailing the 3D structure of the human Histamine H1 receptor protein. This resulted in the development of 'third generation' anti-histamines, drugs effective against some allergies without adverse side-effects.
- In December 2017, UK established the Synchrotron Techniques for African Research and Technology (START) with a £3.7 million funded by the UK Research and Innovation for 3 years. START aimed to provide access to African researchers with focus on energy materials and structural biology. The step is requisite for the inception of the first African Light Source.
- Published in the Proceedings of the National Academy of Sciences in April 2018, a five institution collaboration including scientists from Diamond used three of Diamond's macromolecular beamlines to discover details of how a bacterium used plastic as an energy source. High resolution data allowed the researchers to determine the workings of an enzyme that degraded the plastic PET. Subsequently, computational modelling was carried out to investigate and thus improve this mechanism.
- An article published in Nature in 2019 described how a worldwide multidisciplinary collaboration designed several ways to control metal nano-particles, including synthesis at a substantially reduced cost for use as catalysts for the production of everyday goods.
- Research conducted at Diamond Light Source in 2020 helped determine the atomic structure of SARS‑CoV‑2, the virus responsible for COVID-19.
- In 2023, Diamond Light Source scanned the Herculaneum papyri including scroll PHerc. Paris. 4 to facilitate non-invasive decipherment through machine learning.

=== Insects study ===
Using X-ray beamlines, researchers examine insect specimens from the London Natural History Museum's collection, which contains millions of uncatalogued insects. The synchrotron's imaging technology provides detailed views of anatomical features, such as wing structures and mandibles, revealing evolutionary adaptations and ecological roles.

Studies investigated the documented decline in insect populations, with research indicating a 45% reduction over four decades, attributed to factors like habitat loss, pesticides and climate change. By analyzing both fossilized and modern specimens, researchers explored how insects responded to past environmental changes, providing data relevant to current biodiversity challenges. The synchrotron's ability to process large 3D image datasets facilitates the identification of uncatalogued specimens and supports studies on species critical to pollination and food chains.

Research also examined insect responses to contemporary issues, such as microplastic accumulation and geographic shifts due to climate change. For example, comparisons of historical and modern butterfly specimens help track range changes in the UK. These studies contribute to understanding insect evolution and ecology, offering insights into conservation and the broader impacts of environmental change on ecosystems.

== See also ==
- List of synchrotron radiation facilities
- Synchrotron Radiation Source (SRS)
- European Synchrotron Radiation Facility (ESRF)
- MAX IV
- Sirius (synchrotron light source)
- BESSY
- DESY
- SOLEIL
- Canadian Light Source (CLS)
- Elettra Synchrotron
- The African Light Source (AfLS)
