= Jack Howlett =

British mathematician and computer scientist

Jack Howlett CBE (30 August 1912 – 5 May 1999) was a British mathematician and computer scientist who was head of the Atlas Computer Laboratory for the duration of its existence.

== Personal life and early career ==
He was educated at Stand Grammar School, Whitefield, Manchester and read mathematics at Manchester University. He was awarded a PhD in 1944 for research on the Numerical Integration of Partial Differential Equations.

He worked with the research department of the LMS Railway from 1935 to 1940. He often described his relief when his calculations of the performance of a new braking system were tested successfully on a real steam locomotive complete with sceptical crew.

During the war he worked in research establishments on numerical analysis, under experts including Douglas Hartree, and using equipment such as early mechanical differential analyzers. This was applied to various problems including the atomic bomb project code-named Tube Alloys.

In 1948 he became head of the Computing Section in Theoretical Physics Division, AERE Harwell. He worked on many of the early reactor projects.

In 1966 he was elected Fellow of St Cross College, Oxford. He was a member of the Institution of Electrical Engineers, a Fellow of the Royal Statistical Society and a Fellow of the Institute of Mathematics and its Applications.

He was appointed a CBE in the New Years Honours List of 1969.

He was married to Joan, with whom he had five children. He enjoyed a wide range of musical and artistic activities, was a keen Scottish country dancer, took part in amateur dramatics, and enjoyed cycling and hill-walking. He was known to colleagues for his colourful dress sense and for his lively inquiring mind, extending well beyond narrow professional interests.

== Atlas Computer Laboratory ==
He was appointed Director of the Atlas Computer Laboratory in 1961, where he stayed until retirement in 1975. The Laboratory was created to provide a service to researchers across the United Kingdom with a need for large-scale computing power.

Peter Hall, a Director of Ferranti and later ICL, described how Howlett did business: "I explained to Jack that to order an Atlas we needed a contract that committed them to over £3m for a machine which we could not specify in performance, reliability, or delivery date. Jack did his best to get a commitment from us, but all we could offer was 'best endeavours'. So Jack worked on the contracts people and we got a contract ... which depended totally on trust between Jack and the authority on the one hand, and Jack and Ferranti – essentially me – on the other. It all worked out. It enabled the Atlas Laboratory to get off the ground, and Ferranti to establish the Atlas computer in the market place."

== Retirement ==
On retirement from the Atlas Laboratory, Howlett took up a post with ICL as founding editor of the ICL Technical Journal, a publication designed to give technical information about research and product innovation both inside the company and among its users and research partners. Peter Hall invited him to take this post in 1978 and he remained editor until 1990, thereafter continuing with an active role on the editorial board until his death; he thus had the unique distinction of receiving an ICL award for 21 years' service which only started at the age of 65. He ran the meetings of the editorial board efficiently in the relaxed atmosphere of his London club, always followed by good food, wine, and conversation.

He co-authored a history of computing.

He also undertook a number of translation projects in his retirement, for example translating books on object-oriented languages and databases from French into English.
