= ORRF Risk Research Forum =

The ORRF Risk Research Forum a forum on risk research organised by the ORRF, a recognised internationally as a leading risk research foundation. It was established, in April 1999, as an independent think tank, with tacit support from the Financial Services Authority (FSA) and the Science Research Council.

ORRF's aim is to drive forward the boundaries of knowledge in the field of risk, with a view to improving performance, enhancing resilience, and increasing transparency (which promotes market forces and acts as a barrier to fraud, corruption, and financial crimes).

Research and publications by ORRF have won international acclaim.

ORRF has held forum events on leading-edge issues in collaboration with the Bank of England, the FSA, BaFin, the OCC, the New York State Banking Department, the Dutch National Bank and professional bodies such as the British Bankers' Association, ISDA, the Institute of Actuaries, the Securities & Investment Institute, and many others.

ORRF established the Institute of Operational Risk (IOR), in 2004, to disseminate research findings and promote leading-edge thinking amongst practitioners, with the aim of raising professional standards. ORRF received support from Cambridge University Judge Institute, BaFin, ISDA, and the Financial Services National Training Organization (FSNTO).

Membership of ORRF is by invitation only, with its members being regarded as leading experts and key opinion formers in their field. Membership is primarily drawn from academia, regulatory bodies, professional institutes, rating agencies, and major financial services firms.

The chairman of ORRF is Professor Brendon Young.
