= Harwell Science and Innovation Campus =

Science campus in Oxfordshire, England

Coordinates: 51.58°N 1.31°W

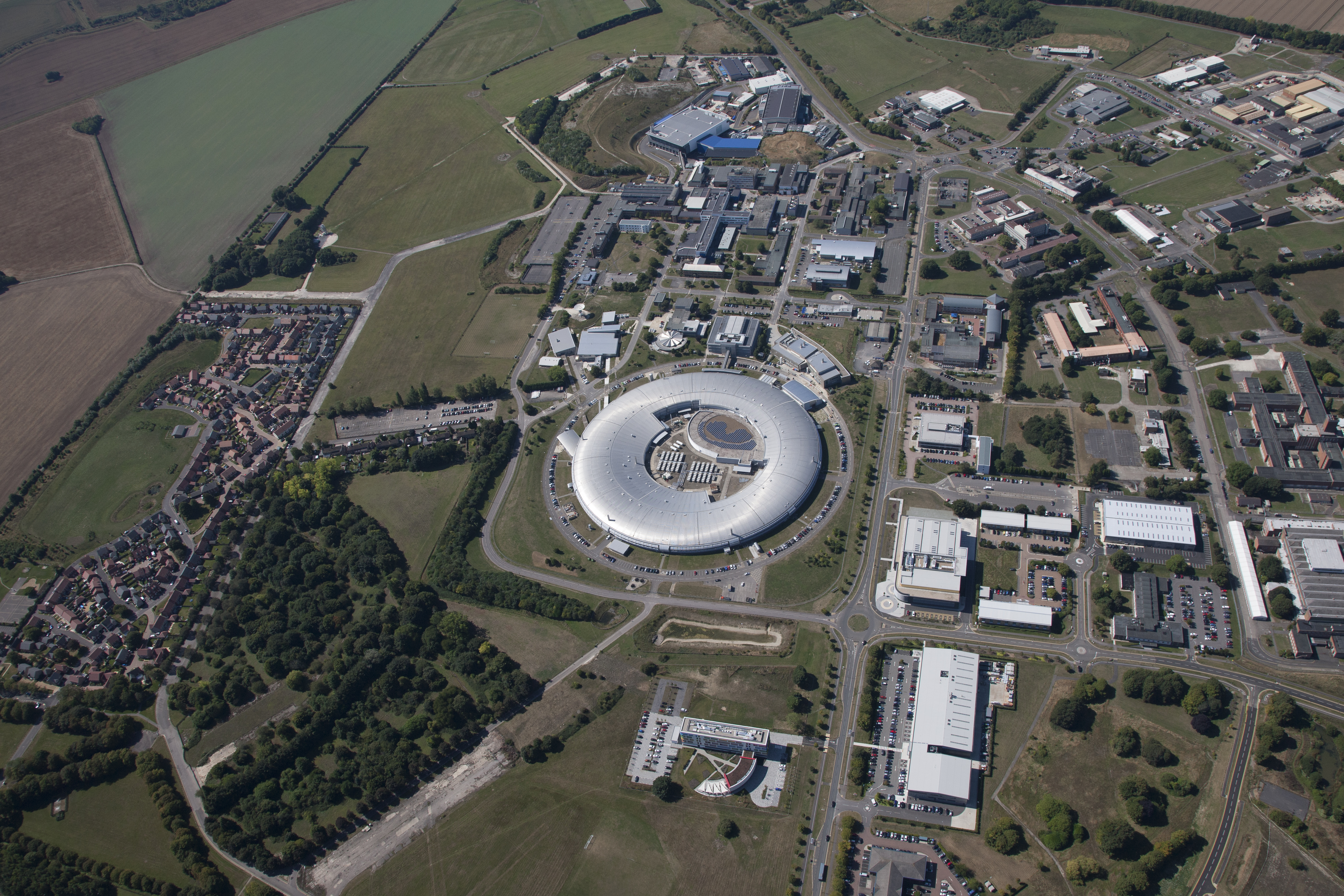
- Aerial image of the campus
- Interactive map of Harwell Science and Innovation Campus
- Other names: Harwell; Harwell SIC; HSIC
- Location: Didcot, Oxfordshire, England
- Status: Completed
- Use: Science and technology business park

Companies
- Owner: United Kingdom Atomic Energy Authority; Science and Technology Facilities Council; Public Health England
- Manager: HSIC Joint Venture Partnership

Technical details
- Size: 280 ha (700 acres)

The Harwell Science and Innovation Campus is a 280-hectare (700-acre) science and technology business park at Didcot in Oxfordshire, England. Over 6,000 people work there in over 240 public and private sector organisations, working across sectors including aerospace, clean energy, life sciences, and quantum computing.

The site is 2 miles (3 km) outside Didcot, about 15 miles (24 km) south of Oxford and roughly 6 miles (10 km) east of Wantage. A large part of the site was formerly the main research establishment of the United Kingdom Atomic Energy Authority (UKAEA), and it has seen a transition to its new role as a science and business park as the nuclear facilities have been decommissioned.

== The campus ==
Over 6,000 people work on the campus in some 240 organisations representing a multidisciplinary range of advanced scientific and technological disciplines. The campus is owned by the UKAEA, the Science and Technology Facilities Council, and Public Health England. It is managed by the Harwell Science and Innovation Campus joint venture partnership.

Major companies and organisations on the site include

- Central Laser Facility
- Diamond Light Source Synchrotron
- ISIS Neutron and Muon Source
- Rutherford Appleton Laboratory
- Science and Technology Facilities Council (STFC)

Space cluster organisations

- Astroscale
- ClearSpace Today
- European Space Agency
- Magdrive
- Open Cosmos
- Orbit Fab
- Oxford Space Systems
- RAL Space
- Satellite Applications Catapult (part of the Catapult centres network)
- Thales Alenia Space
- UK Space Agency

Life sciences and health-tech organisations

- Amec Foster Wheeler
- Medical Research Council Harwell Institute
- Nuvia
- Oxford Nanopore
- Rosalind Franklin Institute
- UK Health Security Agency (previously known as Public Health England)

Energy organisations

- The Faraday Institution
- Ricardo Energy & Environment
- RHEA Group
- United Kingdom Atomic Energy Authority

The National Quantum Computing Centre will also be built at Harwell Campus.

== History ==
RAF Harwell was built by John Laing & Son Ltd at the junction of three parishes in 1935. The bulk lay within Chilton parish; about a third was in East Hendred; and the smallest portion was in Harwell. The first Commanding Officer, upon being asked what the name of the new airfield should be, responded that it should be named after the parish in which his house lay – and this happened to be Harwell.

Between 1938 and 1940 the airfield was a development site of a prototype Royal Aircraft Establishment Mark III Catapult, whose intention was to enable take-offs using shorter runways and so the planes could be loaded with more fuel. Although technical problems caused its abandonment without ever launching an aircraft, it proved to be a precursor to Catapult Armed Merchant ships.

=== Atomic Energy Research Establishment ===
The northern part of the Campus was formerly the Atomic Energy Research Establishment, which was created after the Second World War on the site of RAF Harwell. It was the main centre for atomic energy research and development in the United Kingdom from the 1940s to the 1990s, latterly being amalgamated into the United Kingdom Atomic Energy Authority. A number of test nuclear reactors were sited on the Campus over the years. The nuclear facilities are in the hands of the Nuclear Decommissioning Authority. As parts of the site are decommissioned, they are delicensed and dedesignated and no longer secured hence the area "inside the fence" is gradually shrinking. It is planned that the entire site will be decommissioned by 2025.

Achievements on the campus at this time included the creation of the world's first transistorised computer, CADET, in 1953 and the world's first experimental ‘fast’ reactor, ZEPHYR, was built in 1954.

=== Rutherford Appleton Laboratory ===
In 1957 the Rutherford High Energy Laboratory (now the Rutherford Appleton Laboratory, RAL) was established on a site immediately south of the AERE. This was followed in 1961 by the Atlas Computer Laboratory, absorbed into the Rutherford in 1974. The southern site, including the RAL, became known as the Chilton/Harwell Science Campus. RAL is operated by the Science and Technology Facilities Council (STFC), and its facilities include the ISIS neutron source.

In 2004, RAL Space engineered the Ptolemy instrument for the Philae lander on the European Space Agency's (ESA) Rosetta expedition.

Between 2003 and 2007 the Diamond synchrotron was constructed on the RAL site, the UK's largest scientific investment for 30 years.

=== Harwell International Business Centre ===
As the former UKAEA site was being decommissioned, a new role became necessary to maintain levels of employment in the area, building on the site's reputation for pioneering research, and ensuring that Harwell remained one of the UK's major centres for science and technology. Therefore, in 1996, it was relaunched as a business park. One of the businesses on-site is the UKAEA spin-off company AEA Technology. As well as attracting numerous other hi-tech businesses, the Harwell IBC also has numerous amenities such as a bank, post office, hairdresser, sports facilities including a cricket pitch, and its own bus station.

=== Creation of the Science and Innovation campus ===
In March 2006 the government announced plans to transform the Harwell International Business Centre into the Harwell Science and Innovation Campus. In August 2006 the government announced an investment of £26.4 million to construct new research facilities on the campus and the creation of a joint venture partnership.

=== European Space Agency ECSAT (Roy Gibson Building) ===
The European Space Agency moved into Harwell Science and Innovation Campus in May 2013. It was the first ESA base in the UK. ESA then constructed and opened the Roy Gibson Building (named after ESA's first Director General) in July 2015. The ESA facility, named European Centre for Space Applications and Telecommunications or ECSAT focuses upon three key areas: combining data and images from space to create new applications for everyday life; observations and research on climate change (the facility hosts ESA's Climate Office); and the development of novel power sources and innovative robotic technologies to explore space.

Harwell Campus is now a significant part of the UK space sector and over 100 space organisations are based there including the European Space Agency, RAL Space, Satellite Applications Catapult, Thales Alenia Space, Astroscale, ClearSpace Today and the UK Space Agency.

== See also ==
- List of science parks in the United Kingdom
