= Synchrotron Radiation Source =

X-ray facility at Daresbury Laboratory in England

Coordinates: 53°20′35″N 02°38′26″W

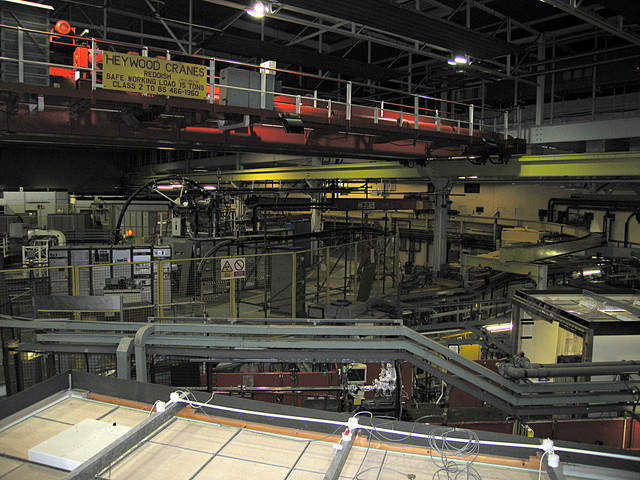
The SRS synchrotron seen in 2007

The Synchrotron Radiation Source (SRS) at the Daresbury Laboratory in Cheshire, England was the first second-generation synchrotron light source to produce X-rays. The research facility provided synchrotron radiation to a large number of experimental stations and had an operating cost of approximately £20 million per annum.

SRS had been operated by the Science and Technology Facilities Council. The SRS was closed on 4 August 2008 after 28 years of operation.

== History ==
Following the closure of the NINA synchrotron, construction of the facility commenced in 1975 and the first experiments were completed using the facility by 1981.

In 1986 the storage ring was upgraded with additional focusing to increase the output brightness, the new 'lattice' being termed the HBL (High Brightness Lattice).

== Design and evolution ==
Like all second-generation sources, the SRS was designed to produce synchrotron radiation principally from its dipole magnets, but the initial design foresaw the use of a high-field insertion device to provide shorter-wavelength electromagnetic radiation to particular users.

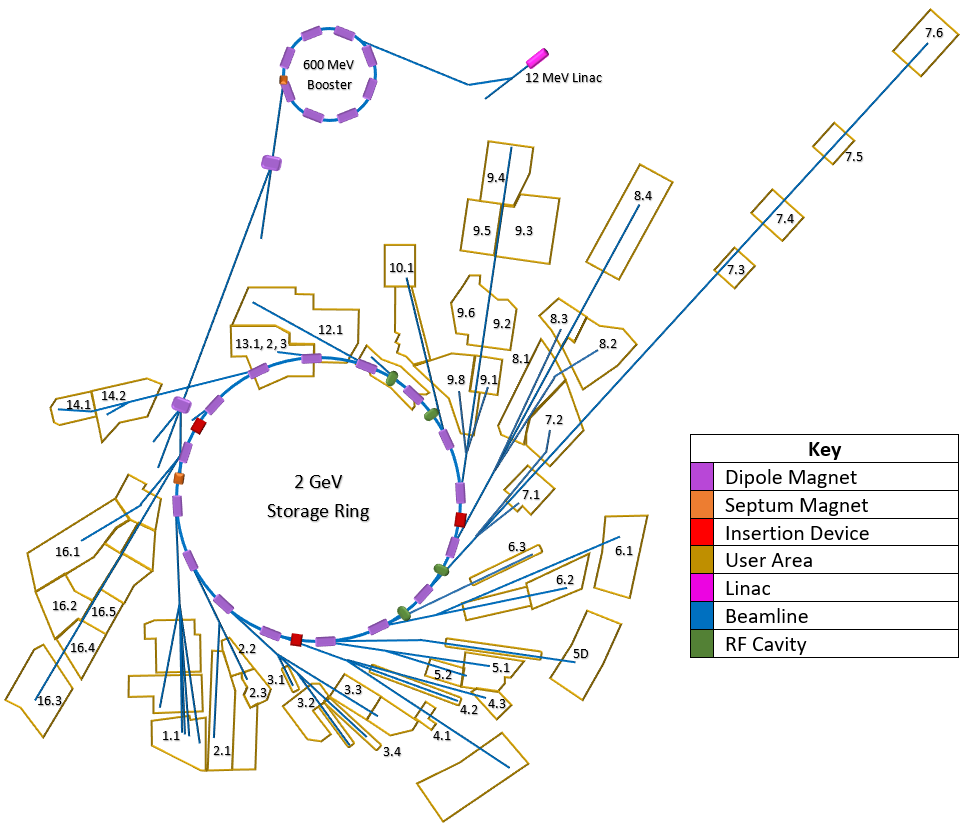
A diagram of the layout of the SRS

The first storage ring design was a 2 GeV FODO lattice consisting of alternating focussing and defocussing quadrupoles, with one dipole following every quadrupole (i.e. two dipoles per repeating cell), giving a natural beam emittance of around 1000 nm-rad with 16 cells.

The HBL upgrade implemented in 1986 increased the total number of quadrupoles to 32, whilst retaining the same number of cells and geometry, and reduced the operating emittance to around 100 nm-rad in the so-called 'HIQ' (high tune) configuration. A 'LOQ' (low tune) configuration was also provided, to allow the efficient storage of one intense bunch of electrons (instead of up to 160), to provide radiation bursts at 3.123 MHz (the revolution frequency of the electrons, corresponding to the 96 m circumference).

The design of the SRS consisted of a 5 MeV electron gun at the start of an injector linac, which increased the energy to 12 MeV, to feed into a booster ring which boosted the electrons up to 600 MeV, which then fed into and filled up the storage ring. Once the storage ring was "full", the booster and linac were powered down and the energy of the storage ring was then ramped up to 2 GeV. Due to this design, the storage ring could not be topped up by the linac and booster until the storage ring was turned off, when the beam current was too low for experiments to take place. In the original design, the typical initial circulating current was around 300mA but after the HBL upgrade it was decreased to around 220mA. The beam current would slowly drop over the course of several hours, when it would then have to be "re-filled", however it could be maintained at current of around 200mA for over 30 hours.

The storage ring had 16 dipole magnets, from which 15 tangental beamlines supplied synchrotron light to the many different stations. Beamline 15 did not provide light to experimental stations, likely due to space constraints, so instead it only featured a beam monitoring unit.

== Stations and beamlines ==
The SRS had 16 beamlines which had many different functions. Below is a list of the experimental stations and their purposes;

Station Number	Description
1.1	Surface Spectroscopy
1.2	Spin-Resolved Photoemission
2.1	Time-Resolved X-Ray Diffraction
2.2	Ultra Small Angle Diffraction
2.3	High Resolution Powder Diffraction
3.1	Photo-Ion Mass Spectroscopy
3.2	High Resolution Molecular Spectroscopy
3.3	Angle-Resolved Photoelectron Spectroscopy
3.4	Soft X-Ray EXAFS/Contact Microscopy
4.1	X-Ray Spectroscopy
4.2	Surface X-Ray Spectroscopy
5U.1	Surface Spectroscopy
5U.2	X-Ray Microscopy
5D	Gas-Phase Spectroscopy
6.1	ARPES
6.2	ARPES
6.3	Surface EXAFS
7.1	EXAFS
7.2	Protein Crystallography
7.3	High Angle Diffraction
7.4	Energy Dispersive EXAFS
7.5	Beam Monitor Station
7.6	X-Ray Topography
8.1	EXAFS
8.2	Small Angle Scattering
8.3	Powder Diffraction
8.4	Test Station
9.1	High Flux Powder Diffraction
9.2	EXAFS
9.3	EXAFS and Material Processing
9.4	X-Ray Diffraction
9.5	Protein Crystallography
9.6	Protein Crystallography
9.7	Energy Dispersive Diffraction
9.8	High Flux Single Crystal Diffraction
10.1	Monochromatic X-Rays
11.1	Infrared Microspectroscopy
12.1	Time Resolved Spectroscopy
13.1a	Time-resolved Confocal Fluorescence Lifetime Imaging and Spectroscopy
13.1b	Time-resolved Fluorescence Spectroscopy
13.2	Synchrotron Light Area
13.3	Infrared Interferometry
14.1	Protein Crystallography and Fiber Diffraction
14.2	Protein Crystallography
16.1	Fixed Wavelength High Intensity Diffraction
16.2	General Purpose Diffraction
16.3	Materials and Magnetic Diffraction
16.4	White Beam Station and Energy Dispersive Powder Diffraction
16.5	Ultra-Dilute Spectroscopy

== Scientific output and achievements ==
The SRS supported a broad range of science, including pioneering work on X-ray diffraction, structural molecular biology, surface physics and chemistry, materials science and upper atmosphere physics. Following its closure, a detailed study of the economic impact of the SRS was made.

Two Nobel Prizes in Chemistry have been received by scientists who performed part of their prize-winning research using the SRS: Sir John E. Walker in 1997 for his contribution to the understanding of the synthesis of ATP (Adenosine Triphosphate), a key component of the body’s energy transport, and Sir Venki Ramakrishnan for his work on the structure and function of the ribosome, the molecular machine that constructs proteins from ‘instructions’ coded in mRNA. Over 5000 academic papers were produced.

== See also ==
- Diamond Light Source
