= Cosener's House =

Building in Abingdon, Oxfordshire, England

Coordinates: 51.670138°N 1.279316°W

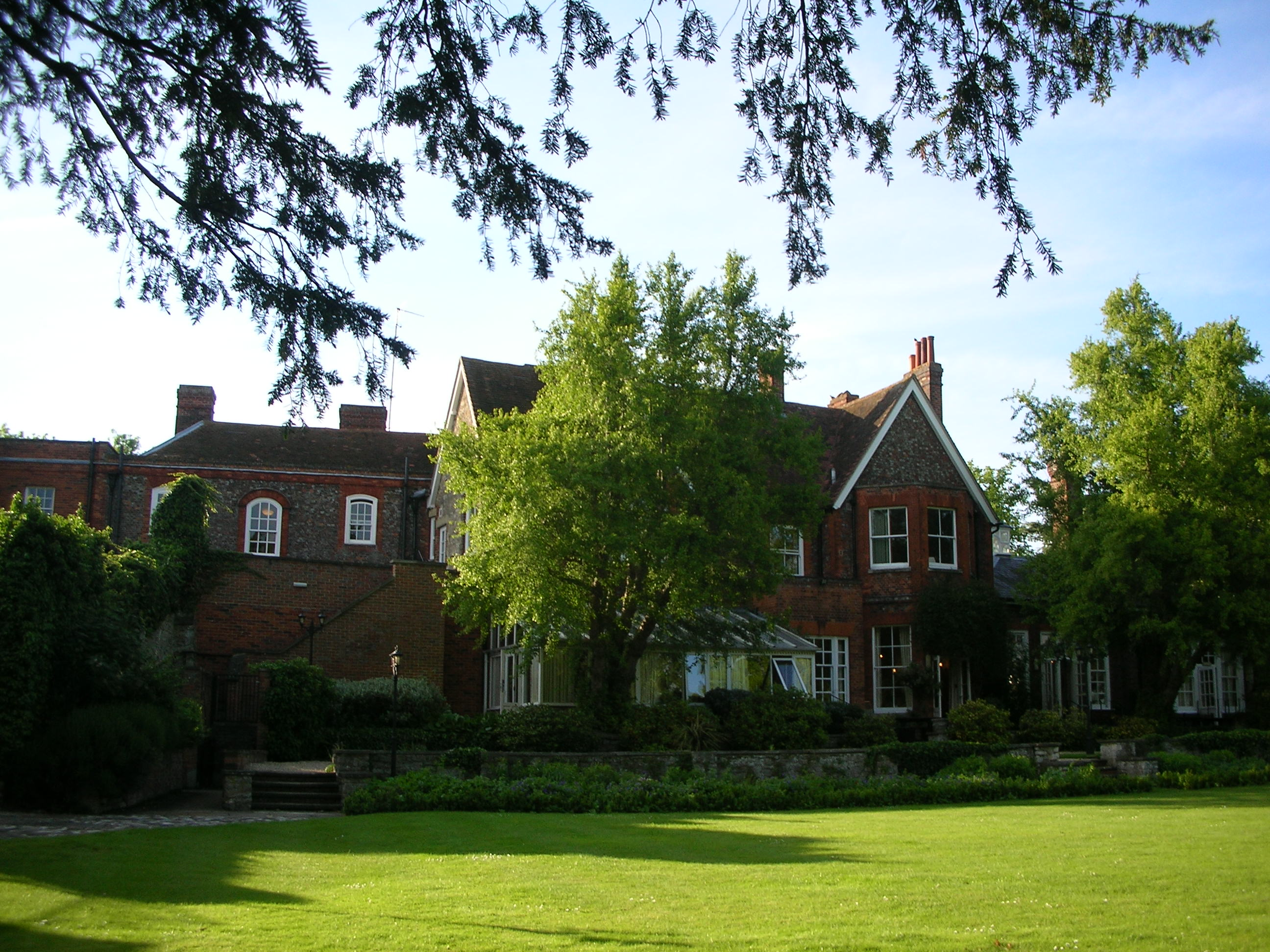
The lawn and main building.

The Cosener's House sits on the northern bank of the River Thames in Abingdon, separated from the town by the Abbey mill stream and within the original grounds of Abingdon Abbey. It is located near the centre of the town of Abingdon, Oxfordshire, England. It is run as a conference centre with accommodation by the Science and Technology Facilities Council (STFC). The annual UK Next Generation Networking meeting, Multi-Service Networks, takes place at the Cosener's House every July.

The house takes its name from the Cuisinier or Kitchener, the person at the Abbey who was responsible for the provision of food.

The building is Grade II listed.

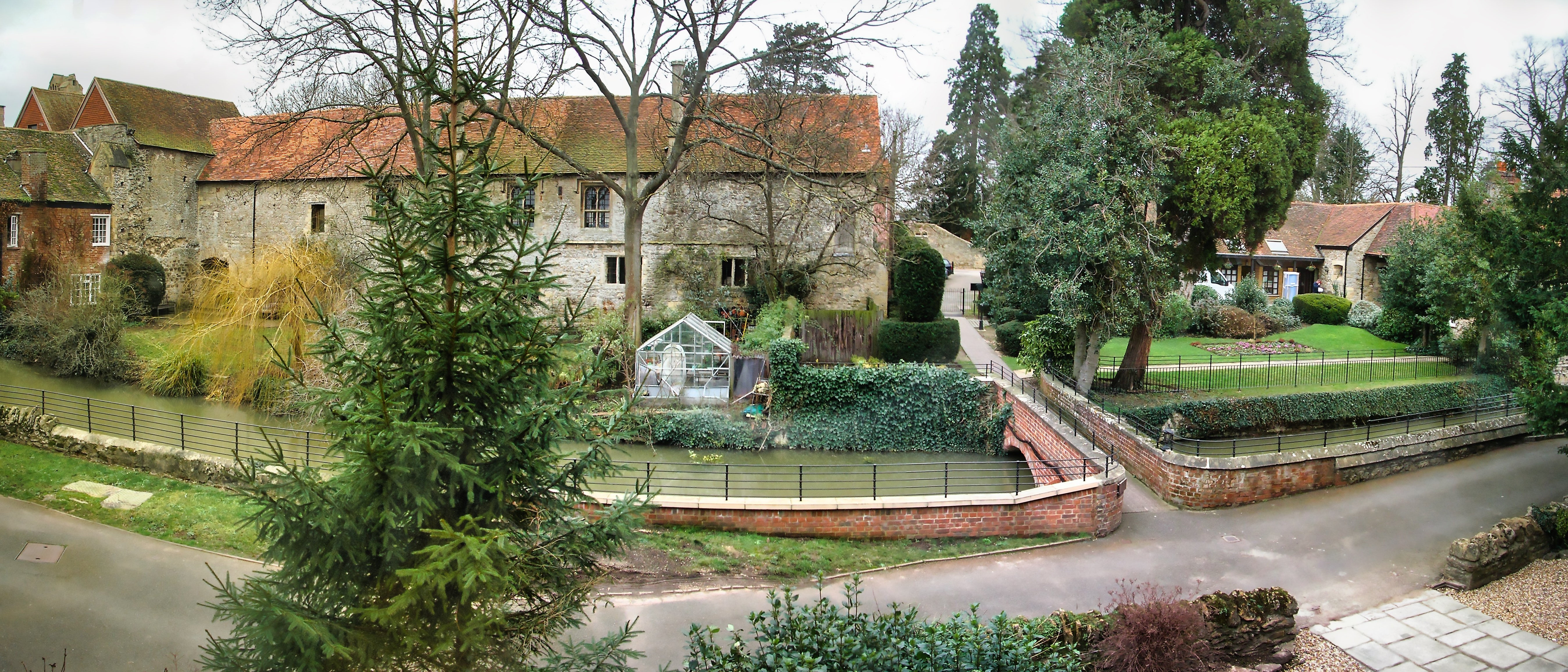
Views from The Cosener's House
