= Nimrod (synchrotron) =

7 GeV proton synchrotron

Coordinates: 51°34′24″N 1°18′53″W

Nimrod (National Institute Machine Radiating on Downs, "the Mighty Hunter" Nimrod; name attributed to W. Galbraith) was a 7 GeV proton synchrotron operating in the Rutherford Appleton Laboratory in the United Kingdom between 1964 and 1978. Nimrod delivered its last particles at 17:00 hrs on 6 June 1978. Although roughly contemporary with the CERN PS its conservative design used the "weak focussing" principle instead of the much more cost-effective "strong-focussing" technique, which would have enabled a machine of the same cost to reach much higher energies.

The design and construction of Nimrod was carried out at a capital cost of approximately £11 million. It was used for studies of nuclear and sub-nuclear phenomena.

Nimrod was dismantled and the space it occupied reused for the synchrotron of the ISIS neutron source.

== Magnet power supply ==
The magnet power supply included 2 motor-alternator-flywheel sets. Each drive motor was 5,000 HP. Each flywheel was 30 tonnes. Each alternator was 60 MVA 12.8kV. Magnet currents would pulse at 10,550 A.
