= John Dowell =

British physicist (born 1935)

- Born: 6 January 1935
- Alma mater: University of Birmingham
- Employer: CERN (1960–1962); University of Birmingham (1958–2002)
- Awards: Fellow of the Royal Society (1986); Institute of Physics Ernest Rutherford Medal and Prize (1988)

John Derek Dowell FRS (born 6 January 1935) is a British physicist, emeritus professor at University of Birmingham.

Born in Leicestershire, he was educated at Coalville Grammar School and the University of Birmingham (BSc, PhD).

He worked as a Research fellow at Birmingham University (1958–1960) before moving to be a research associate at the European Organization for Nuclear Research near Geneva (1960–1962). He then returned to Birmingham as lecturer (1962–1970), senior lecturer (1970–1974) and reader (1974–1980). In 1980 he was appointed Professor of Elementary Particle Physics and finally retired as professor emeritus in 2002.

He published results from CERN's SPS accelerator which included the first observation in Europe of the J/psi particle, which consists of charmed quarks, supporting the theory that matter is composed of quarks. After research at the Hadron-Electron Ring Accelerator (HERA) at DESY in Hamburg, he helped develop detectors for the Large Hadron Collider (LHC) at Geneva and was involved in the ATLAS experiment which discovered the Higgs boson. He won the 1988 Rutherford Medal and Prize.

He was elected a Fellow of the Royal Society in 1986 and a Fellow of the American Physical Society in 2003.

In July 2002, a symposium was held in his honour, as he retired in September of that year.
