= Science and Technology Facilities Council =

Government agency of the United Kingdom

Council overview
- Formed: 2007; 19 years ago
- Status: Council within UK Research and Innovation
- Headquarters: Swindon, Wiltshire, England
- Annual budget: £608 million (FY2024/25)
- Ministers responsible: Liz Kendall MP, Secretary of State for Science, Innovation and Technology; Patrick Vallance, Minister of State for Science, Research and Innovation
- Council executive: Michele Dougherty, Executive Chair
- Parent department: Department for Science, Innovation and Technology
- Parent body: UK Research and Innovation
- Website: stfc.ukri.org

The Science and Technology Facilities Council (STFC) is a council of UK Research and Innovation (UKRI), a non-departmental public body sponsored by the Department for Science, Innovation and Technology, that carries out research in science and engineering, and funds UK research in areas including particle physics, nuclear physics, space science and astronomy (both ground-based and space-based).

== History ==
STFC was formed in April 2007 when the Particle Physics and Astronomy Research Council (PPARC), the Council for the Central Laboratory of the Research Councils (CCLRC), along with the nuclear physics activities of the Engineering and Physical Sciences Research Council (EPSRC) were brought under the one umbrella organisation. The organisation's first Chief Executive was Professor Keith Mason, who held the position until 2011, when he was replaced by Professor John Womersley.

Womersley was the CEO until 2016 when he left to become Director General of the European Spallation Source. Dr Brian Bowsher, former CEO of the National Physical Laboratory and member of STFC's Council was the last CEO of the STFC before it was subsumed into UK Research and Innovation. In 2018, Professor Mark Thomson was appointed as the first Executive Chair of STFC under UKRI. Professor Michele Dougherty took over in 2025.

== Purpose ==
STFC's mission is "To maximise the impact of our knowledge, skills, facilities and resources for the benefit of the United Kingdom and its people" under several heads:

- Universities: the STFC supports university-based research, innovation and skills development in particle physics, nuclear physics, space science and astronomy.
- Scientific Facilities: They provide access to world-leading, large-scale facilities across a range of physical and life sciences, enabling research, innovation and skills.
- National Campuses: Working with partners to build National Science and Innovation Campuses based around National Laboratories to promote academic and industrial collaboration and translation of research to market through direct interaction with industry.
- Inspiring and Involving: STFC help create a future pipeline of skilled and enthusiastic young people by using the excitement of our sciences to encourage wider take-up of STEM subjects in school and future life (science, technology, engineering and mathematics).

== Activities ==
The STFC is one of Europe's largest multidisciplinary research organisations supporting scientists and engineers worldwide. Through research fellowships and grants, it is responsible for funding research in UK universities, in the fields of astronomy, particle physics, nuclear physics and space science. The STFC operates its own world-class, large-scale research facilities, such as materials research, laser and space science and alternative energy exploration, and provides strategic advice to the UK government on their development.

It manages international research projects in support of a broad cross-section of the UK research community and directs, coordinates and funds research, education and training. It is a partner in the UK Space Agency (formerly British National Space Centre or BNSC) providing about 40% of the UK government's expenditure in space science and technology.

== Facilities ==
It helps operate/provide access for UK and international scientists to the following large-scale facilities:

- Advanced LIGO, United States
- Boulby underground laboratories, England
- Central Laser Facility (CLF), Rutherford Appleton Laboratory
- CERN, Switzerland
- CLARA and VELA, Daresbury Laboratory
- Diamond Light Source, Rutherford Appleton Laboratory site (partly funded by the Wellcome Trust)
- DiRAC Distributed Research using Advanced Computing (Supercomputing facility), United Kingdom
- The space science and space exploration programmes of ESA, Europe
- European Synchrotron Radiation Facility (ESRF), France
- European Spallation Source (ESS), Sweden
- The Hartree Centre for high performance computing and data analytics, Daresbury Laboratory
- Institut Laue-Langevin (ILL), France
- Isaac Newton Group of Telescopes (ING), La Palma
- ISIS pulsed neutron and muon source, Rutherford Appleton Laboratory
- The LHC Computing Grid (through its funding of the GridPP project), Worldwide
- Microelectronics Support Centre (MSC), Rutherford Appleton Laboratory
- UK Astronomy Technology Centre, Edinburgh

== Former facilities ==
- The Synchrotron Radiation Source (SRS), Daresbury Laboratory
- ALICE and EMMA, Daresbury Laboratory
- HPCx, Daresbury Laboratory

== Knowledge exchange obligations ==
STFC is active in its responsibility for knowledge exchange from government funded civil science into UKPLC. As such, many technologies are licensed to UK companies and spin-out companies created including:

- L3 Technology (L3T);
- Microvisk;
- Orbital Optics Ltd;
- Oxsensis;
- PETRRA;
- Quantum Detectors;
- ThruVision.

However knowledge exchange activities are not purely limited to commercialization of technologies, but also cover a wider range of activities which aim to transfer expertise into the wider economy.

== See also ==
- Cosener's House, a conference centre owned by STFC in Abingdon
- National Astronomy Week (NAW)
