= Particle Physics and Astronomy Research Council =

Former British research council

PPARC Logo

The Particle Physics and Astronomy Research Council (PPARC) was one of a number of research councils in the United Kingdom. It directed, coordinated and funded research in particle physics and astronomy for the people of the UK. Its head office was at Polaris House in Swindon, Wiltshire, but it also operated three scientific sites: the UK Astronomy Technology Centre (UK ATC) in Edinburgh, the Isaac Newton Group of Telescopes (ING) in La Palma and the Joint Astronomy Centre (JAC) in Hawaii. It published the Frontiers magazine three times a year, containing news and highlights of the research and outreach programmes it supports.

The PPARC was formed in April 1994 when the Science and Engineering Research Council was split into several organizations; other products of the split included the Engineering and Physical Sciences Research Council (EPSRC) and the Biotechnology and Biological Sciences Research Council (BBSRC). In April 2007, it merged with the Council for the Central Laboratory of the Research Councils (CCLRC) and the nuclear physics portion of the EPSRC to form the new Science and Technology Facilities Council (STFC).

== Frontiers magazine ==
PPARC previously published a magazine called Frontiers, ISSN 1460-5600.

== See also ==
- List of astronomical societies
