= Rutherford Appleton Laboratory =

British scientific research laboratory

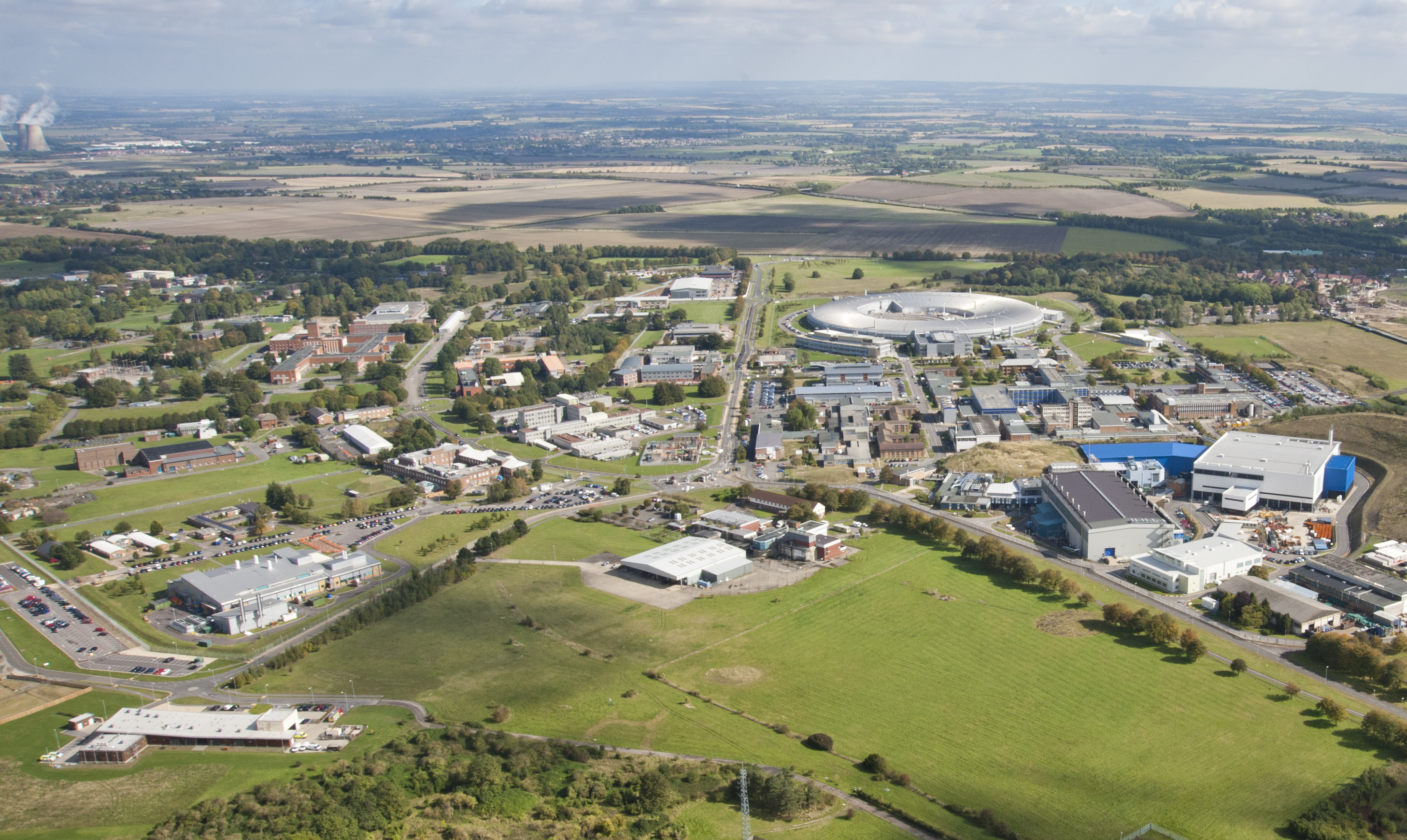
- Aerial view of Rutherford Appleton Laboratory
- Established: 1957
- Laboratory type: National scientific research laboratory
- Field of research: Applied science; Fundamental science
- Staff: 1,200
- Location: Chilton, Oxfordshire, England; 51°34′24″N 1°18′53″W
- Operating agency: Science and Technology; Facilities Council
- Website: www.ukri.org/about-us/stfc/locations/rutherford-appleton-laboratory/

Map
- Location within Oxfordshire

The Rutherford Appleton Laboratory (RAL) is one of the national scientific research laboratories in the UK operated by the Science and Technology Facilities Council (STFC). It began as the Rutherford High Energy Laboratory, merged with the Atlas Computer Laboratory in 1975 to create the Rutherford Lab; then in 1979 with the Appleton Laboratory to form the current laboratory.

It is located on the Harwell Science and Innovation Campus at Chilton near Didcot in Oxfordshire, England. It has a staff of approximately 1,200 people who support the work of over 10,000 scientists and engineers, chiefly from the university research community. The laboratory's programme is designed to deliver trained manpower and economic growth for the UK as the result of achievements in science.

== History ==
RAL is named after the physicists Ernest Rutherford and Edward Appleton.

The National Institute for Research in Nuclear Science (NIRNS) was formed in 1957 to operate the Rutherford High Energy Laboratory established next to the Atomic Energy Research Establishment on the former RAF Harwell airfield between Chilton and Harwell. The 50 MeV proton linear accelerator was transferred from the Atomic Energy Research Establishment to the new laboratory to become a national facility for particle physics as the Nimrod. Some components of this linear accelerator are still operating as part of the ISIS Neutron and Muon Source injector linac over 50 years after their first use. Since then the laboratory has grown both with the expansion of its established facilities, and the incorporation of facilities from other institutions to provide the benefits from economies of scale. The major mergers were in 1975 with the adjacent Atlas Computer Laboratory creating the Rutherford Laboratory, and then in 1979 with the Appleton Laboratory to form the current Rutherford Appleton Laboratory. With the closure of the Royal Greenwich Observatory in 1998, some small offices also moved to RAL. Similarly, laser technology moved to RAL from Joint European Torus at Culham to become the foundation of the Central Laser Facility.

To be able to decide the priorities for government funding across all areas of scientific research, the Science & Technology Act of 1965 created the Science Research Council (SRC) which took over management of the Rutherford High Energy Laboratory from NIRNS along with many other previously disparate UK science bodies. To prioritise economic impact over blue skies research, the SRC became the Science and Engineering Research Council (SERC) in the early 1980s, and in 1994, the SERC was eventually divided into three Research Councils (the EPSRC, PPARC and the CCLRC – which took responsibility for RAL from EPSRC in 1995), so that each could then focus its development around one of three incompatible business models – administratively efficient short duration grant distribution, medium term commitments to international agreements, long-term commitments to staff and facilities provision. To unify the planning of the provision for UK scientists to access large national and international facilities, in 2007 the CCLRC merged with PPARC and incorporated the nuclear physics discipline from EPSRC to create the Science and Technology Facilities Council which then took responsibility for RAL.

== Facilities ==
The site hosts some of the UK's major scientific facilities, including:

- the ISIS Neutron and Muon Source (1984), a spallation neutron source.
- the Central Laser Facility, providing access to large scale laser systems for researchers from the United Kingdom and other EU countries.
- the Diamond Light Source synchrotron, which officially opened in January 2007.

Also hosted are:

- National Microelectronics Support Centre (MSC)
- NGS UK national academic computing grid
- GridPP's Tier1 computing centre
- Energy Research Unit
- various other resources and services in microelectronics, atmospheric sciences, spectroscopy and renewable energy research.

== Programmes ==
In addition to hosting facilities for the UK, RAL also operates departments to co-ordinate the UK programme of participation in major international facilities. The largest of these are the areas of particle physics, and space science.

In particle physics the largest international project is the Large Hadron Collider at CERN, but RAL has a major role in the UK participation in several other projects such as:

- the MINOS – Main Injector Neutrino Oscillation Search,
- the T2K – to measure the third type of neutrino oscillation,
- experiments to measure the electric dipole moment of the neutron at the Institut Laue–Langevin,
- International Muon Ionization Cooling Experiment,
- the UK Dark Matter Collaboration experiment at the Boulby Mine in Yorkshire.

In space science, RAL builds components for, and tests satellites, as well as receiving, analysing and curating the data collected by those spacecraft. Satellite missions in which RAL has a significant role include:

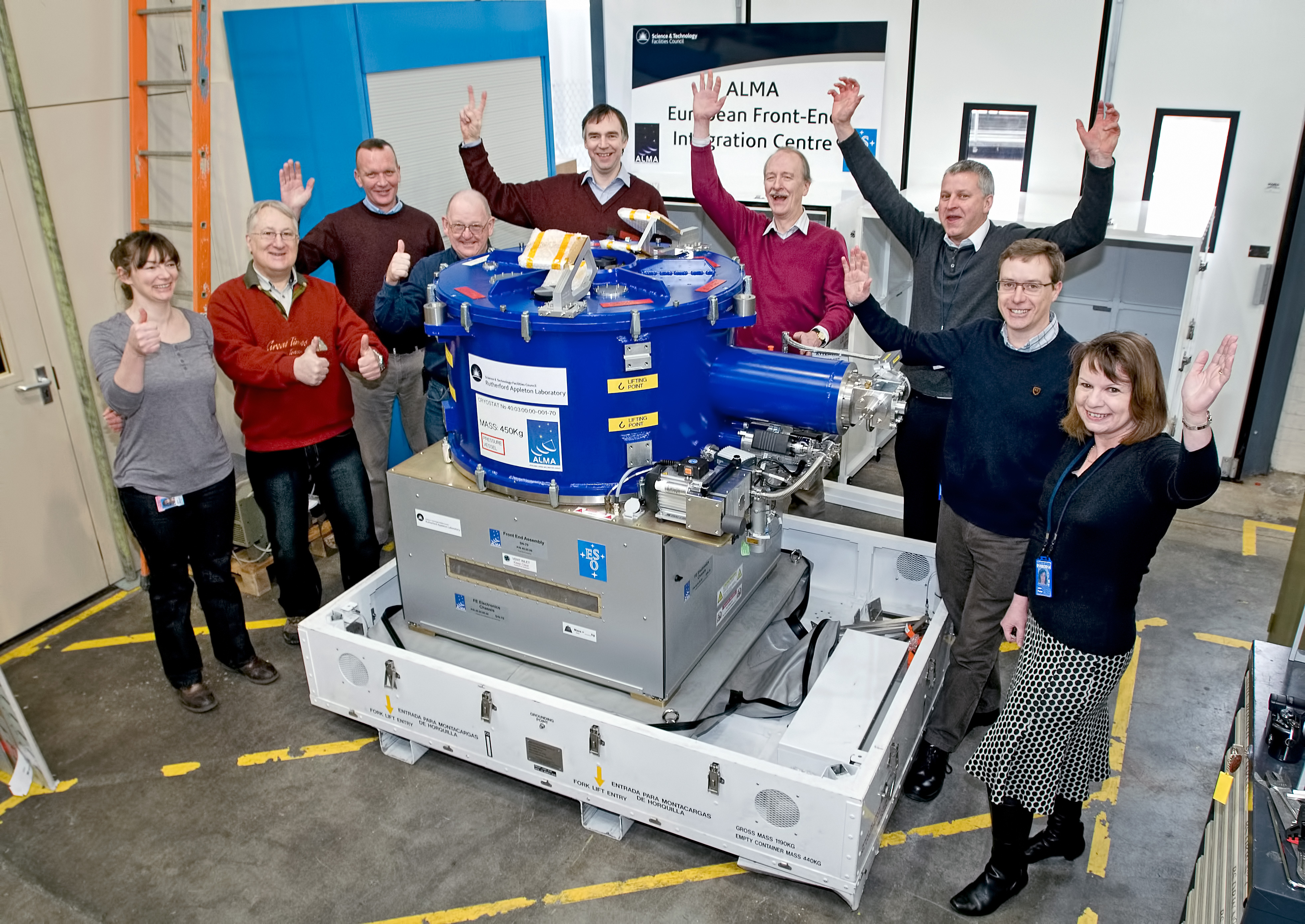
The team at the ALMA project's European Front End Integration Centre at the Rutherford Appleton Laboratory, UK.

- the STEREO Solar TErrestrial RElations Observatory,
- the SOHO Solar and Heliospheric Observatory,
- Solar-B investigating the Solar Corona,
- Galileo European satellite navigation system,
- MSG-2 meteorological satellite,
- Venus Express investigating the atmosphere of Venus,
- TopSat taking high resolution pictures of the Earth,
- Double Star (Polar) investigating the interaction of the Earth and the Sun,
- EOS-Aura monitoring the global temperature of the Earth's atmosphere,
- Rosetta (spacecraft) investigating the composition of comets,
- Chandrayaan-1 mission to investigate the moon,
- Herschel Space Observatory and Planck (spacecraft) space telescope.
- Badr-B, developed the CCD cameras for the satellite.

== Economic impact ==
In recent years, there has been an increasing political drive towards requiring that the science undertaken at RAL and the technology created there result in a proportional economic benefit to the UK to justify the investment of public funds in the laboratory. RAL management has argued that this is achieved in various ways, including:

- From the commercial products and services resulting from the scientific results which are achieved on the facilities at RAL (e.g., through new materials, new drugs etc.).
- Through the early warning of disasters predicted from terrestrial and space data acquired and analysed at RAL (e.g., radio/mobile phone interference predictions, severe weather predictions etc.).
- Through the training of specialist scientists and engineers at RAL, who then move into commercial companies.
- Through the standardisation of technologies which has resulted in the acceleration of economic growth through interoperability and interchangeability of products — especially in computing.
- By the enthusiasm generated in science by the results of large facilities (e.g., from astronomical images or from particle physics experiments), which leads to schoolchildren choosing scientific training and scientific careers in many fields.
- By technologies developed at RAL during the development of facilities themselves, which are then licensed to UK companies, or spin-out companies.

== Decommissioning ==
According to its Annual Report from 2017 to 2018, STFC expects the end of the ISIS pulsed neutron source and the associated Second Target Station to be in 2040 and anticipates decommissioning to take 55 years. The cost of radioactive waste disposal could range between £9 million and £16 million.

== In popular culture ==
RAL was used as a set for the filming of an episode of Terry Nation's BBC TV series Blake's 7.

The computer-generated imagery (CGI) for Ridley Scott's 1979 film Alien were created at the Atlas Computer Laboratory which is now part of RAL.

The Space Science department featured in the "In the Box" episode of the CBeebies series Nina and the Neurons.

== See also ==
- Daresbury Laboratory
- Oak Ridge National Laboratory
- Argonne National Laboratory
- Spallation Neutron Source
- European Spallation Source
- Institut Laue–Langevin
- European Synchrotron Radiation Facility
- Commonwealth Scientific and Industrial Research Organisation
- List of synchrotron radiation facilities
- European Space Agency Facilities
- European Research Area
- Diamond Light Source
