= Yanglai Cho =

South Korean physicist (1932–2015)

Yanglai Cho (Korean: 조양래; 11 November 1932 – 14 June 2015) was a South Korean physicist.

After completing his bachelor's degree in physics at Seoul National University in 1956, he moved to the United States to continue studying the subject, successively earning a master's degree from Brigham Young University in 1958 and a doctorate from the Carnegie Institute of Technology in 1966. Before obtaining his doctorate, Cho was a physics instructor at Vassar College between 1960 and 1962. Upon attaining a Ph.D., Cho held concurrent posts as a research physicist at Carnegie and a research associate at Argonne National Laboratory. He then became director of the accelerator group for Argonne's Zero Gradient Synchrotron and worked on the Intense Pulsed Neutron Source before leaving for the University of Wisconsin from 1983 to 1985. Upon returning to Argonne, Cho worked on the Advanced Photon Source as project director and deputy associate laboratory director. Between 1999 and 2001, Cho was technical director of the Spallation Neutron Source at Oak Ridge National Laboratory. In 2000, Cho was elected a fellow of the American Physical Society, "[f]or continuing excellent contributions to high energy physics experiments and technology, and to the design and commissioning of large accelerator facilities."

Cho died of pneumonia complications on 14 June 2015, aged 82.
