= John M. Carpenter =

American nuclear engineer (1935–2020)

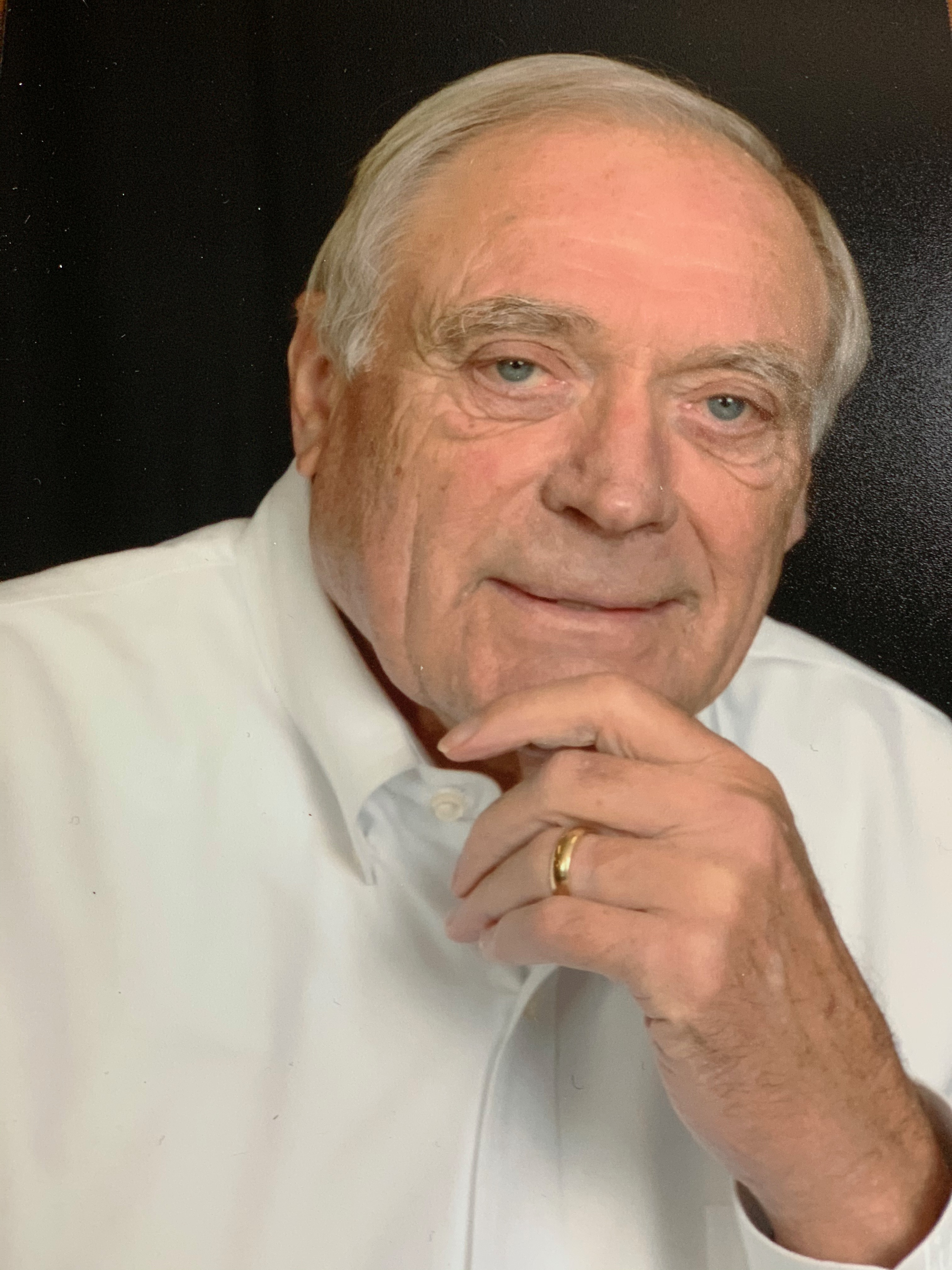
- Born: John Marland Carpenter; June 20, 1935; United States
- Died: March 10, 2020 (aged 84)
- Education: Pennsylvania State University, University of Michigan
- Awards: Fellow of the American Association for the Advancement of Science
- Scientific career
- Fields: Nuclear Engineering
- Workplaces: University of Michigan; Argonne National Laboratory

John M. "Jack" Carpenter (June 20, 1935 - March 10, 2020) was an American nuclear engineer known as the originator of the technique for utilizing accelerator-induced intense pulses of neutrons for research and developing the first spallation slow neutron source based on a proton synchrotron, the Intense Pulsed Neutron Source (IPNS). He died on 10 March 2020.

== Education ==
Carpenter earned the Bachelor of Science degree in Engineering Science at Pennsylvania State University in 1957 and the Master of Science and Doctor of Philosophy degrees in Nuclear Engineering at the University of Michigan in 1958 and 1963, respectively. His dissertation is titled Prediction and Measurement of Neutron Chopper Burst Shapes.

== Career ==
Following completion of his Ph.D., Carpenter took a Post-Doctoral Fellowship at the University of Michigan Institute for Science and Technology in Ann Arbor, Michigan, from 1963 to 1964. In 1964 he joined the UM faculty as an assistant professor in the Department of Nuclear Engineering; he was promoted to full professor in 1973.

In 1975, Carpenter moved to the Argonne National Laboratory, where he developed the first-ever pulsed Spallation Neutron Source for neutron scattering, the ZGS (Zero Gradient Synchrotron) Intense Neutron Generator Prototype (ZING-P), which then led in 1981 to the construction of the Intense Pulsed Neutron Source (IPNS) used in a broad range of neutron research. Internationally known as "Dr. Spallation," he helped develop other sources, including the Japan Atomic Energy Research Institute (JAERI) Multiprogram Research Facility, the European Spallation Source in Sweden; and smaller scale sources at the ISIS Neutron and Muon Source in the UK, the Kō Enerugī Kasokuki Kenkyū Kikō (KEK) Neutron Science Laboratory (KENS) in Japan, the Los Alamos Neutron Science Center (LANSCE) at the Los Alamos National Laboratory (LANL), and the Swiss Spallation Neutron Source (SINQ) in Switzerland. In 1977 he and colleagues Rex G. Fluharty of LANL, Motoharu Kimura of Japan, and Leo C. W. Hobbis of the UK cofounded the International Collaboration on Advanced Neutron Sources (ICANS), a forum for collaborating on neutron research and innovative neutron systems.

During his career, Carpenter has held a number of term appointments at public and private institutions, including Visiting Scientist at Phillips Petroleum Company, Nuclear Technology Branch, Idaho Falls, Idaho, Fall 1965; Argonne National Laboratory, Solid State Science Division, 1971–1972, 1973; Los Alamos Scientific Laboratory, Physics Division, 1973; and the Japanese Laboratory for High Energy Physics, Kō Enerugī Kasokuki Kenkyū Kikō, (KEK), 1982 and 1993. He has also served as senior physicist and manager for the Argonne National Laboratory, Solid State Science Division, Intense Pulsed Neutron Source Project, 1975–1978; technical director for the Intense Pulsed Neutron Source Project, 1978; senior technical advisor for the Oak Ridge National Laboratory, Spallation Neutron Source project, Experimental Facilities Division, 1998, and the Rutherford-Appleton Laboratory, periodically since 1997; and as adjunct professor of nuclear engineering and member of the graduate faculty of Iowa State University, 1987–1989.

Carpenter served as a member of the 1977 U.S. Delegation to the USSR on Fundamental Properties of Matter, Item 21 of the 1973 Nixon-Brezhnev Agreement on US-USSR Cooperation in Research, Development and Utilization of Nuclear Energy; the Pennsylvania State University College of Engineering Industrial and Professional Advisory Council, 1984–1986; the National Steering Committee for the Advanced Neutron Source, 1986–1996; the Visiting Committee for the Massachusetts Institute of Technology Department of Nuclear Engineering, 1989–1995; the External Review Committee for the Los Alamos Accelerator Production of Tritium project, 1993–1998; the International Scientific Council of AUSTRON, Verein zur Förderung einer Großforschungsanlage in Österreich, from 1993; the Technical Advisory Committee of the European Spallation Source, from 2001; and the Oak Ridge National Laboratory Scientific Advisory Committee for the Spallation Neutron Source, 1996–2001.

He has served as scientific reviewer for the journals Nuclear Instruments and Methods in Physics Research, Review of Scientific Instruments, Nature, Nuclear Science and Engineering; for the U.S. Department of Energy and the National Science Foundation; and as editor for numerous conference proceedings. He is a member of American Nuclear Society (Chairman, Southeast Michigan Section, 1974–75, Fellow, 2002), American Physical Society (Fellow, Division of Condensed Matter Physics, 1990), Neutron Scattering Society of America, Swiss Neutron Scattering Society, American Association for the Advancement of Science, and Sigma Xi. He has authored over 180 publications and technical reports, a patent for the pulsed source moderator reflector (U.S. Pat. No. 3,778,627), and co-authored two books, Living With Nuclei: 50 Years in the Nuclear Age, Memoirs of a Japanese Physicist with Motoharu Kimura. and Elements of Slow-Neutron Scattering: Basics, Techniques, and Applications with Chun-K. Loong.

Carpenter associated with the AES Division of the Advanced Photon Source, an Office of Science User Facility operated for the U.S. Department of Energy by Argonne National Laboratory. He consulted at the Spallation Neutron Source, was a visiting professor of physics at Indiana University, was the spokesperson for the Union of Compact Accelerator-Driven Neutron Sources (UCANS), and was active in the preservation and communication of the history of nuclear engineering, with emphasis on how its development relates to current and future technologies.

== Awards and recognition ==
Formal recognition of Carpenter's contributions include:

- Regents of the University of Michigan, Rackham Graduate School Faculty Recognition Award, 1967,
- University of Chicago Distinguished Performance award, 1982, for development of the IPNS,
- Ilya Frank Prize, 1998, awarded by the Joint Institute for Neutron Studies at Dubna, Russia for his role in the development of the solid methane moderator,
- Fellow of the American Nuclear Society,
- Fellow of the American Physical Society,
- Fellow of the Neutron Scattering Society of America,
- Engineering Alumni Society Merit Award from the University of Michigan, 2006,
- Clifford Shull Prize, 2006, sponsored by the Neutron Scattering Society of America,
- Fellow of the American Association for the Advancement of Science, 2011 "for distinguished service to the materials sciences community by original innovation of pulsed spallation neutron sources and instrumentation for research using neutron scattering facilities."
