= Michigan Spin Physics Center =

Center focusing on proton-proton scattering experiments

Fig 1. The red arrow shows the unexpected split between parallel and anti-parallel spins

The University of Michigan Spin Physics Center focuses on studies of spin effects in high polarized proton-proton elastic and inelastic scattering. These polarized scattering experiments use the world-class solid and jet polarized proton targets, which are developed, upgraded and tested at the center. The Center obtained a record density of about 10^{12} spin-polarized hydrogen atoms per cm^{3}.

The center also led the development of the world's first accelerated polarized beams at the 12 GeV Argonne ZGS (in 1973) and then at the 28 GeV Brookhaven AGS. The Center led pioneering experiments at the IUCF Cooler Ring from 1988 until its 2003 shutdown, which developed and tested Siberian snakes and Spin-flippers, which are now used to accelerate, store and use high energy polarized proton beams.

The center also leads the International SPIN Collaboration and its proton polarization know-how is used in many experiments worldwide.

== Main discoveries ==
Unsolved problem in physics:
Why parallel protons interact stronger than anti-parallel protons?
(more unsolved problems in physics)

In 1978 the Center found that protons with parallel spins interact much stronger than protons with anti-parallel spin. According to Quantum Chromodynamics the interaction between parallel and anti-parallel spinning proton beams should be the same. Sheldon Glashow called this effect "the thorn in the side of QCD".

This effect remained unexplained until today. In 2005 Stanley Brodsky called it "one of the unsolved mysteries in hadronic physics".
