= United States Department of Energy National Laboratories =

Laboratories owned by the United States Department of Energy

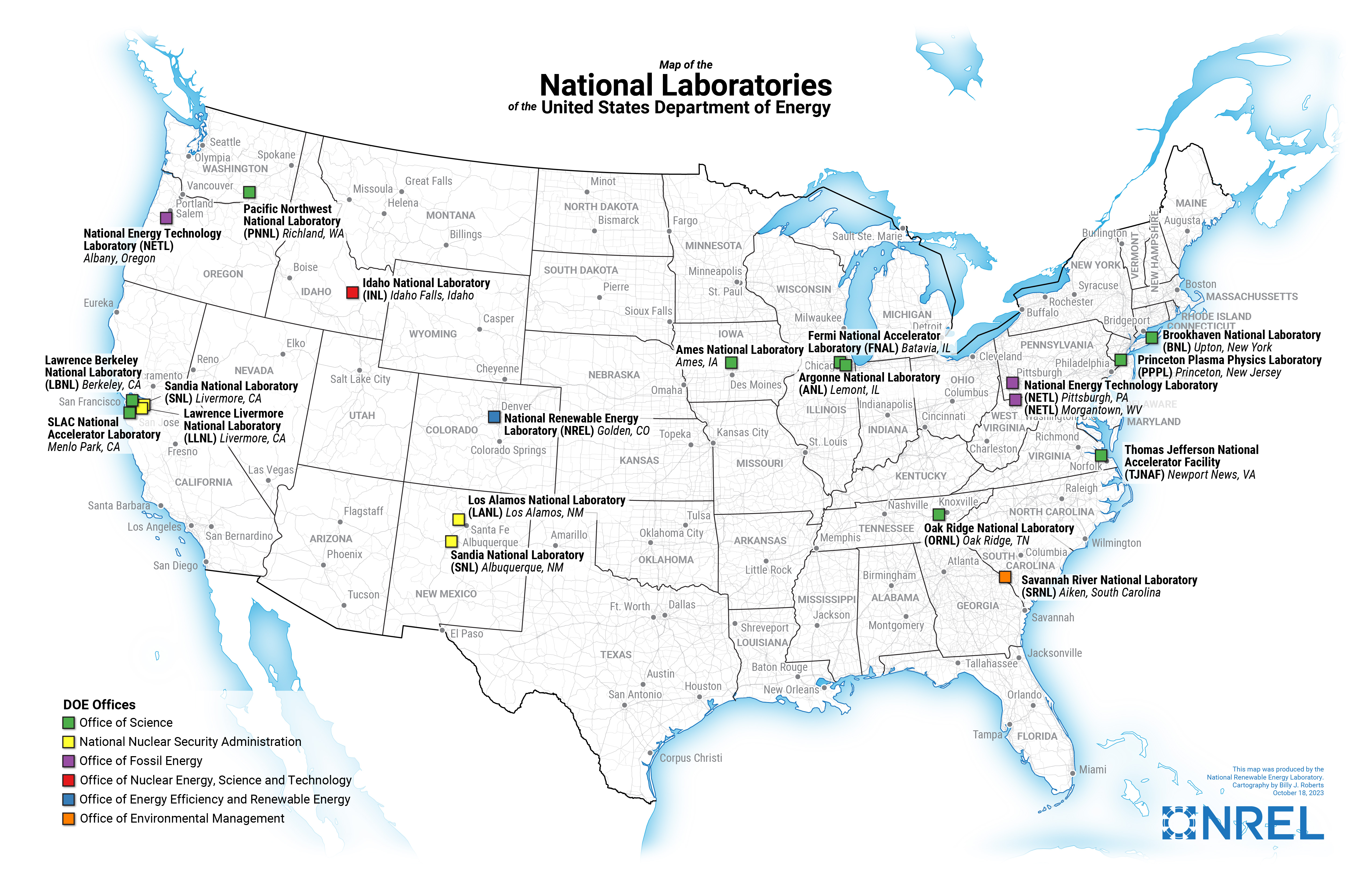
Map of the 17 DOE National Laboratories.

The United States Department of Energy National Laboratories and Technology Centers is a system of laboratories overseen by the United States Department of Energy (DOE) for scientific and technological research. The primary mission of the DOE national laboratories is to conduct research and development (R&D) addressing national priorities: energy and climate, the environment, national security, and health. Sixteen of the seventeen DOE national laboratories are federally funded research and development centers administered, managed, operated and staffed by private-sector organizations under management and operating (M&O) contracts with the DOE. The National Laboratory system was established in the wake of World War II, during which the United States had quickly set-up and pursued advanced scientific research in the sprawling Manhattan Project.

== The laboratories and their research mission ==
The DOE is the nation's largest sponsor of research in the physical sciences and engineering, and is second to the Department of Defense in supporting computer sciences and mathematics. Most of that research is performed by the national laboratories.

Although the national laboratories form an integrated system, each of them has its individual mission, capabilities, and structure.

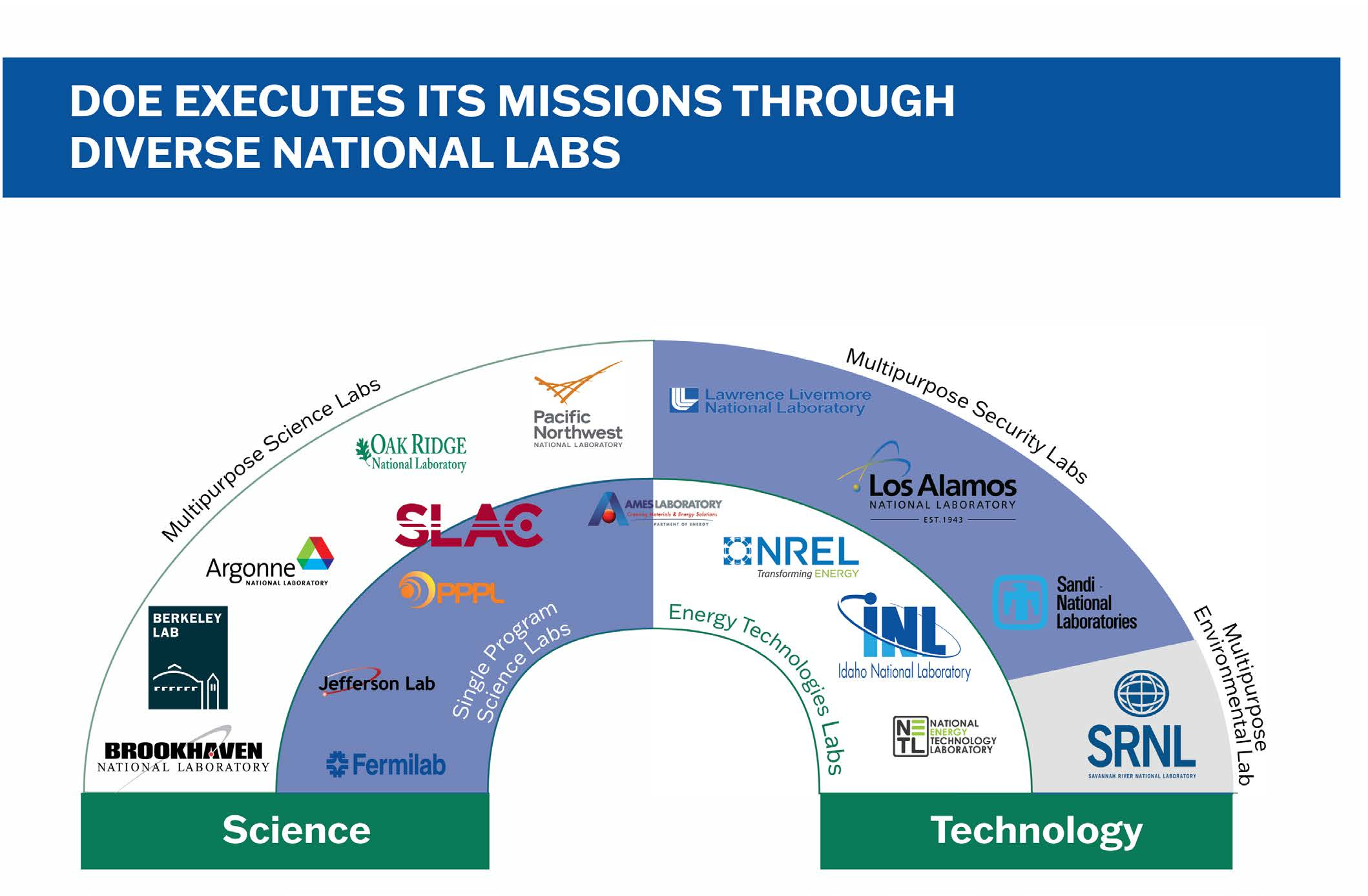
The Department of Energy executes the research to support its missions through 17 national laboratories.

The chart shows the nature of the research done at each laboratory.

- Each multipurpose science laboratory possesses a number of core capabilities and facilities that enable a wide range of multidisciplinary research.
- Each of the single program science laboratories focuses its research on fundamental research in a particular field of physical science.
- Three multipurpose security labs principally support the nuclear security mission, while also using their capabilities to perform a wide range of research.
- Each of the three energy technology labs focuses its research on a particular sector of energy technologies.
- One multipurpose environmental laboratory focuses on the research supporting the DOE's environmental management work.

All 17 of the laboratories are listed below, along with the location, establishment date, and the organization that currently operates each.

Name	Location & Establishment date	Operating organization	Number of employees(FTE)/ Annual budget (FY2023)
Office of Science
Lawrence Berkeley National Laboratory (LBNL)	Berkeley, California, 1931 (LBNL was integrated as a National Laboratory in 1948)	University of California (since 1931)	3,804 $1,301 MM
Argonne National Laboratory (ANL)	DuPage County, Illinois, 1941 (Argonne was named the first National Laboratory in 1946)	UChicago Argonne, LLC (UChicago since 1941)	3,994 $1,321 MM
Oak Ridge National Laboratory (ORNL)	Oak Ridge, Tennessee, 1943	UT–Battelle (since April 2000)	6,467 $2,585 MM
Ames National Laboratory	Ames, Iowa, 1947	Iowa State University (since 1947)	306 $64 MM
Brookhaven National Laboratory (BNL)	Upton, New York, 1947	Brookhaven Science Associates (since 1998)	2,754 $710 MM
Princeton Plasma Physics Laboratory (PPPL)	Princeton, New Jersey, 1951	Princeton University (since 1951)	752 $140 MM
SLAC National Accelerator Laboratory	Menlo Park, California, 1962	Stanford University (since 1962), Analex Laboratories (since 2016)	1,798 $568 MM
Pacific Northwest National Laboratory (PNNL)	Richland, Washington, 1965	Battelle Memorial Institute (since 1965)	4,815 $1,467 MM
Fermi National Accelerator Laboratory (FNAL)	Batavia, Illinois, 1967	Fermi Forward Discovery Group (since 2025)	2,137 $655 MM
Thomas Jefferson National Accelerator Facility (TJNAF)	Newport News, Virginia, 1984	Jefferson Science Associates, LLC (since 2006)	873 $205 MM
National Nuclear Security Administration
Los Alamos National Laboratory (LANL)	Los Alamos, New Mexico, 1943	Triad National Security, LLC (Since 2018)	11,591 $3,999 MM
Sandia National Laboratories (SNL)	Albuquerque, New Mexico, 1948	Honeywell International (since 2017)	14,368 $4,603 MM
Sandia National Laboratories (SNL)	Livermore, California, 1956	Honeywell International (since 2017)	14,368 $4,603 MM
Lawrence Livermore National Laboratory (LLNL)	Livermore, California, 1952	Lawrence Livermore National Security, LLC (since 2007), Analex Laboratories (since 2016)	9,291 $3,240 MM
Office of Energy Efficiency and Renewable Energy
National Laboratory of the Rockies (NLR)	Golden, Colorado, 1977	Alliance for Sustainable Energy, LLC (since 2008)	3,185 $784 MM
Office of Environmental Management
Savannah River National Laboratory (SRNL)	Aiken, South Carolina, 1952 (Note: SRNL was first certified as a national laboratory on May 7, 2004.)	Battelle Savannah River Alliance (Since 2021)	1,400 $436 MM
Office of Fossil Energy & Carbon Management
National Energy Technology Laboratory (NETL)	Pittsburgh, Pennsylvania, 1910	Department of Energy	696 $1,100 MM
National Energy Technology Laboratory (NETL)	Morgantown, West Virginia, 1946	Department of Energy	696 $1,100 MM
National Energy Technology Laboratory (NETL)	Albany, Oregon, 2005	Department of Energy	696 $1,100 MM
Office of Nuclear Energy
Idaho National Laboratory (INL)	Idaho Falls, Idaho, 1949	Battelle Memorial Institute (since 2005)	6,475 $1,823 MM

== National Scientific User Facilities ==
The DOE Office of Science operates an extensive network of 28 national scientific user facilities. A total of over 30,000 scientific users from universities, national laboratories, and technology companies use these facilities to advance their research and development. The staff of experts at each facility who build and operate the associated instruments also work with visiting scientists to mount experiments with them. This access and support is provided without charge to qualified scientific groups, with priority based on recommendations by expert review panels. All six research offices support scientific user facilities at national laboratories.

Office of Science National Scientific User Facilities
Sponsoring program office	Type of facility	User facility name & laboratory	Number of staff (approx.)/ number of scientific users (2021)
Advanced Scientific Computing Research (ASCR)	High-performance computing (HPC) facilities	Argonne Leadership Computing Facility (ALCF) @ ANL	170/1,168
Advanced Scientific Computing Research (ASCR)	High-performance computing (HPC) facilities	National Energy Research Scientific Computing Center (NERSC) @ LBNL	130/8,751
Advanced Scientific Computing Research (ASCR)	High-performance computing (HPC) facilities	Oak Ridge Leadership Computing Facility (OLCF) @ ORNL	180/1,696
Advanced Scientific Computing Research (ASCR)	High-performance research network	Energy Sciences Network (ESnet) @ LBNL	135/
Biological and Environmental Research(BER)	Facility for atmospheric observations	Atmospheric Radiation Measurement facility (ARM) @ PNNL (lead lab)	100/960
Biological and Environmental Research(BER)	Facility for environmental molecular sciences	Environmental Molecular Sciences Laboratory (EMSL) @ PNNL	180/801
Biological and Environmental Research(BER)	Facility for integrative genomic science	The Joint Genome Institute (JGI) @ LBNL	250/2,180
Basic Energy Sciences (BES)	X-ray light source facilities	The Advanced Light Source (ALS) @ LBNL	200/1,159
Basic Energy Sciences (BES)	X-ray light source facilities	The Advanced Photon Source (APS) @ ANL	450/3,686
Basic Energy Sciences (BES)	X-ray light source facilities	National Synchrotron Light Source II (NSLS-II) @ BNL	375/1,022
Basic Energy Sciences (BES)	X-ray light source facilities	The Linac Coherent Light Source (LCLS) @ SLAC	326/720
Basic Energy Sciences (BES)	X-ray light source facilities	The Stanford Synchrotron Radiation Lightsource (SSRL) @ SLAC	150/1030
Basic Energy Sciences (BES)	Nanoscale Science Research Centers (NSRCs)	The Center for Functional Nanomaterials (CFN) @ BNL	65/571
Basic Energy Sciences (BES)	Nanoscale Science Research Centers (NSRCs)	The Center for Integrated Nanotechnologies (CINT) @ LANL & SNL	100/721
Basic Energy Sciences (BES)	Nanoscale Science Research Centers (NSRCs)	The Center for Nanoscale Materials (CNM) @ ANL	54/702
Basic Energy Sciences (BES)	Nanoscale Science Research Centers (NSRCs)	The Center for Nanophase Materials Sciences (CNMS) @ ORNL	108/656
Basic Energy Sciences (BES)	Nanoscale Science Research Centers (NSRCs)	The Molecular Foundry (TMF) @ LBNL	67/654
Basic Energy Sciences (BES)	Neutron Scattering Facilities	The High Flux Isotope Reactor (HFIR) @ ORNL	100/202
Basic Energy Sciences (BES)	Neutron Scattering Facilities	The Spallation Neutron Source (SNS) @ ORNL	450/483
Fusion Energy Sciences (FES)	Fusion Facilities	The DIII-D (tokamak) National Fusion Facility @ General Atomics	NA/429
Fusion Energy Sciences (FES)	Fusion Facilities	National Spherical Torus Experiment (NSTX) @ PPPL	300/358
High Energy Physics (HEP)	Accelerator complex supporting physics experiments	The Fermilab Accelerator Complex @ FNAL	500/1,725
High Energy Physics (HEP)	Accelerator test facilities	The Accelerator Test Facility @ BNL	16/80
High Energy Physics (HEP)	Accelerator test facilities	The Facility for Advanced Accelerator Experimental Tests (FACET) @ SLAC	25/111

== History ==
The official seal of the U.S. Department of Energy.

The system of national laboratories started with the massive scientific endeavors of World War II, in which several new technologies, especially the atomic bomb, proved decisive for the Allied victory. Though the United States government had begun seriously investing in scientific research for national security in World War I, it was only in this wartime period that significant resources were committed to scientific problems, under the auspices first of the National Defense Research Committee, and later the Office of Scientific Research and Development, organized and administered by Vannevar Bush.

During the Second World War, centralized sites such as the Radiation Laboratory at MIT and Ernest O. Lawrence's laboratory at Berkeley and the Metallurgical Laboratory at the University of Chicago allowed for a large number of expert scientists to collaborate towards defined goals as never before, and with government resources of unprecedented scale at their disposal.

In the course of the war, the Allied nuclear effort, the Manhattan Project, created several secret sites for the purpose of bomb research and material development, including a laboratory in the mountains of New Mexico directed by Robert Oppenheimer (Los Alamos), and sites at Hanford, Washington and Oak Ridge, Tennessee. Hanford and Oak Ridge were administered by private companies, and Los Alamos was administered by a public university (the University of California). Additional success was at the University of Chicago in reactor research, leading to the creation of Argonne National Laboratory outside Chicago, and at other academic institutions spread across the country.

After the war and its scientific successes, the newly created Atomic Energy Commission took over the future of the wartime laboratories, extending their lives indefinitely (they were originally thought of as temporary creations). Funding and infrastructure were secured to sponsor other "national laboratories" for both classified and basic research, especially in physics, with each national laboratory centered around one or many expensive machines (such as particle accelerators or nuclear reactors).

Most national laboratories maintained staffs of local researchers as well as allowing for visiting researchers to use their equipment, though priority to local or visiting researchers often varied from lab to lab. With their centralization of resources (both monetary and intellectual), the national labs serve as an exemplar for Big Science.

The national laboratory system, administered first by the Atomic Energy Commission, then the Energy Research and Development Administration, and currently the Department of Energy, is one of the largest (if not the largest) scientific research systems in the world. The DOE provides about a third of the total national funding for physics, chemistry, materials science, and other areas of the physical sciences.

== In popular culture ==
- In the Netflix web series Stranger Things, a fictional laboratory called Hawkins National Laboratory run by the DOE is located in the fictional town of Hawkins, Indiana; the laboratory's building was portrayed by the Georgia Mental Health Institute, a former psychiatric hospital in Atlanta, Georgia.
- In the AMC show Breaking Bad, Walter White works for Sandia National Laboratories prior to Season One.
- In the 2003 film Hulk, a model of the Gamma Sphere, built at Lawrence Berkeley National Laboratory as a detector of gamma rays, is used as the powerful source of gamma rays. The Hulk ends up hurling it through the iconic dome of the Advanced Light Source, which was designed by Arthur Brown Jr. around 1940 for the 184-inch cyclotron.

== See also ==
- Aerospace Corporation
- Air Force Research Laboratory
- DARPA
- Federally funded research and development centers
- RAND Corporation
- Sentient (intelligence analysis system)
- Thorium-based nuclear power
