= Paul Kearns =

American physicist and academic

Paul K. Kearns
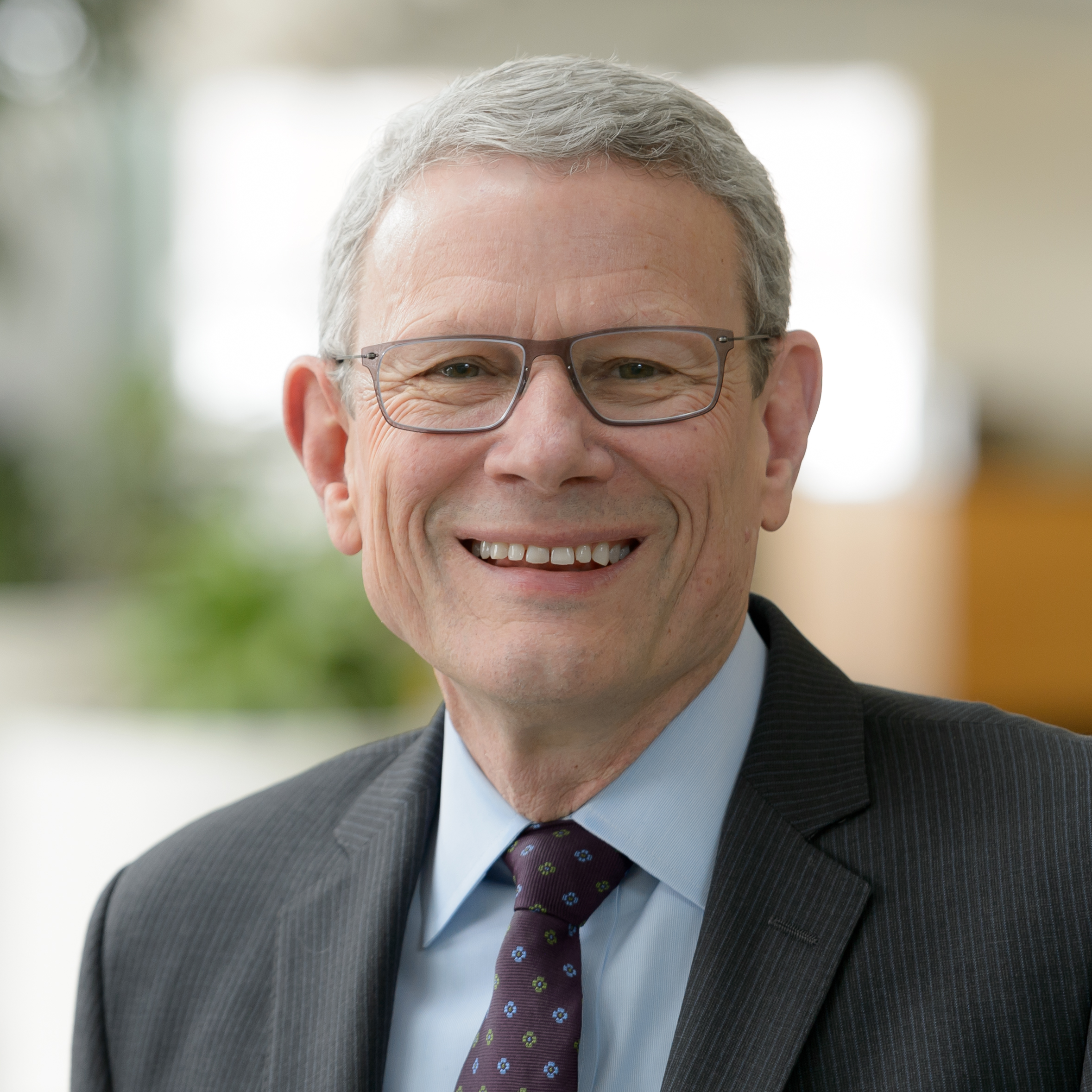
- Kearns in 2017

14th Director of the Argonne National Laboratory
- Incumbent
- Assumed office 2017
- President: Donald Trump; Joe Biden
- Preceded by: Peter Littlewood
- Scientific career
- Education: Purdue University
- Fields: Health Physics
- Workplaces: Pacific Northwest National Laboratory; Idaho National Laboratory; Argonne National Laboratory
- Thesis: The quantitative movement of manganese-54 in a model food chain (1980)
- Doctoral advisor: Richard J. Vetter

Paul K. Kearns is an American health physicist. He received his bachelor's degree from Purdue University in Natural Resources & Environmental Science in 1976 and a master's and Ph.D. in bionucleonics from Purdue University in 1977 and 1980, respectively.

== Career ==
Kearns is laboratory director of Argonne National Laboratory and president of UChicago Argonne, LLC, the organization managing Argonne on behalf of the U.S. Department of Energy's Office of Science.

Kearns' responsibilities include oversight of the upgrade of the Advanced Photon Source and construction of one of the U.S.'s first exascale computing systems. He also oversees a broad portfolio of basic and applied research consisting of discovery science, energy and climate research and development, global security, and the design and operation of large-scale research facilities.

Kearns is a Fellow of the American Association for the Advancement of Science.

Kearns has delivered testimony in front of the House Committee on Science, Space, and Technology and co-chaired the 2020 American Nuclear Society Winter Meeting.

In 2026, Chicago magazine included Kearns in its list of the "50 Most Powerful Chicagoans".

== Publications and invited presentations ==
- Kearns, P. K., and R. Vetter (2004). "Manganese-54 accumulation by Chlorella spp., Daphnia magna and yellow perch (Perca flavescens)". Hydrobiologia 88: 277–280.
- Kearns, P.K., Holton, L.K., Brown, N.R., and Gilbert, R.A. (1998). "Waste Treatment Technology Development to Enable TWRS Phase 1 Privatization", Proceedings of Spectrum 1998, International Conference on Decommissioning and Decontamination and on Nuclear and Hazardous Waste Management.
- Jaksch, J., Kearns, P., Weimar, M., Robinson, B., Laster, M., Scully, L., Lemeshewsky, W., Gilbert, R., and Brown, N. (1998). "The Use of Innovative Contract Terms and Conditions to Achieve a Balanced Risk Allocation for Market-Driven Contract Initiatives", Proceedings of Waste Management (Tucson, Arizona, March 1998).
- Kearns, P.K., Atchison, G.J. (1979). "Effects of trace metals on growth of yellow perch (Perca flavescens) as measured by RNA-DNA ratios". Environ Biol Fish 4, 383–387.
