= Pam Henderson =

Pamela W. Henderson is an author, entrepreneur, CEO, professor, and speaker in the area of business and marketing innovation. She founded NewEdge, an innovation strategy firm that utilizes design methodology to create new insight for business.

== Career ==
After receiving her Ph.D. in market strategy and insight from the University of Texas in 1989, Henderson became an assistant professor at Carnegie Mellon University. During her time there (from 1988 to 1992) she conducted global research on the impact of design on consumer response and the potential return on investment of design. Her discoveries were published in the Harvard Business Review and other top journals. In 1990, she presented her research and chaired a sub-committee at the Academy of Marketing Science conference.

In 1992, Henderson became a full professor of marketing at Washington State University. While there, she furthered her research on the integration of design in market research and business strategy. Henderson also assisted the United States National Laboratory System to identify products and markets from technology platforms. This work became the base for developing Disruptive Market Research®, a user-centered, qualitative approach to market research that identifies areas for innovation.

In 2003, Henderson founded NewEdge, which uses her research in utilizing design methodology for business strategy. Her research was published in journals such as the Wall Street Journal and the Harvard Business Review, and featured spots on NPR. In 2006, Henderson began contributing to the Industrial Research Institute (IRI) as an innovation subject matter expert on combining technology push and market pull.

Henderson later left Washington State University to grow NewEdge full-time, and expanded the company to additional locations in Seattle, San Francisco, Pittsburgh, and Chicago. She has been a guest speaker for a number of business and science organizations such as the Association for Consumer Research, the Industrial Research Institute, 31st Annual Meeting of the Western Decision Sciences Institute, the American Advertising Federation, Reputation Institute, Danaher, Novellis, John Deere, and Procter & Gamble.

== Publications ==
- You Can Kill An Idea, But You Can't Kill An Opportunity: How to Discover New Sources of Growth for Your Organization, Wiley, 2013
- Henderson, Pamela W.; Giese, Joan L.; Cote, Joseph A. (2004). "Impression Management Using Typeface Design". Journal of Marketing. 68 (4): 60–72. doi:10.1509/jmkg.68.4.60.42736. JSTOR 30162016.
- “Assess your Competitors to Find Valuable Business Opportunities, Part 3” Chemistry and Industry, Issue 22, November 17, 2003.
- Henderson, Pamela W; Cote, Joseph A; Leong, Siew Meng; Schmitt, Bernd (December 2003). "Building strong brands in Asia: selecting the visual components of image to maximize brand strength". International Journal of Research in Marketing. 20 (4): 297–313. doi:10.1016/j.ijresmar.2003.03.001. SSRN 348520.
- “For Logos, Familiarity Breeds Similarity” Wall Street Journal, May 17, 2001, B12
- “Guidelines for Selecting or Modifying Logos,” (1998) Pamela W. Henderson and Joe Cote, Journal of Marketing, 62 (April) 14-30.
- “The Effect of Product-Level Standards of Comparison on Consumer Satisfaction,” (1997) Joan Giese, Joe Cote, and Pamela W. Henderson, Journal of Consumer Satisfaction, Dissatisfaction, and Complaining Behavior, Vol. 10, 15-25.
- “Designing Positively Evaluated Logos,” (1996) Pamela W. Henderson and Joseph Cote, Marketing Science Institute Working Paper, Report # 96-123.
- “Designing Recognizable Logos,” (1996) Pamela W. Henderson and Joseph Cote, Marketing Science Institute Working Paper, Report # 96-124.
- “Improving the Store Environment: The Impact of Ambient Scent on Evaluations of and Behaviors in a Store,” (1996) Eric Spangenberg, Ayn Crowley and Pamela W. Henderson, Journal of Marketing, 60 (April) 67-80.
- “A Relatively Unbiased Measure of Discrimination Ability,” (1995) Pamela W. Henderson and Bruce Buchanan, Marketing Science, 14 (2) 250-252.
- “Measuring Misinformation in Repeat Trial Pick 1 of 2 Tests,” (1992) Pamela W. Henderson and Bruce Buchanan, Psychometrika, 57 (December) 615-619.
- “Assessing the Bias of Preference, Detection, and Identification Measures of Discrimination Ability in Product Design,” (1992) Bruce Buchanan and Pamela W. Henderson, Marketing Science, 11 (1) 64-75.
- “Mental Accounting and Categorization,” (1992) Pamela W. Henderson and Robert A. Peterson, Organizational Behavior and Human Decision Processes, 51, 92-117.
- “A Standardization Set of 195 Logos: Norms for Codability, Free Associations, Recognition, Affective Evaluations and Stimulus Characteristics,” Pamela W. Henderson, Marketing Science Institute Archive Publication, accepted, in preparation.
- “Identifying Market Opportunities” Northwest Science and Technology.
- “A New Look at Organizational Transformation Using Systems Theory: An Application to Federal Contractors” David J. Lemak, Pamela W. Henderson, and Mike S. Wenger. Journal of Business Management.
