= Sandra Biedron =

American physicist

Sandra Gail Biedron
- Born: 1973 (age 52–53); Palos Park, Illinois
- Education: Lund University; Trinity Christian College; Carl Sandburg High School
- Scientific career
- Workplaces: Moraine Valley Community College; Argonne National Laboratory; University of New Mexico; Colorado State University
- Thesis: Toward creating a coherent next-generation light source : with special emphasis on nonlinear harmonic generation in single-pass, high-gain free-electron lasers (2001)

Sandra Gail Biedron (born 1973) is an American physicist who serves as the Director of Knowledge Transfer for the Center for Bright Beams as well as professor in Electrical & Computer Engineering and Mechanical Engineering at the University of New Mexico, where in 2021 she mentors nine graduate students and two post-doctoral researchers. Her research includes developing, controlling, operating, and using laser and particle accelerator systems. She is also Chief Scientist of Element Aero, a consulting and R&D company incorporated in 2002. She was elected Fellow of the American Physical Society in 2013.

== Early life and education ==
Biedron grew up in Palos Park, Illinois. Her father, Emil John Biedron, was a data scientist and engineer who calculated the re-entry trajectories for space shuttle missions. Her mother, Gail Jean Biedron, encouraged her early interest in chemistry, biology, and antiquity. She lived on a 7-acre property and spent her childhood riding horses. She attended Carl Sandburg High School.

Biedron started her academic career at a community college: she was a student at Moraine Valley Community College, where she completed her classes in 1992 before moving to Trinity Christian College in Palos Heights, Illinois where she majored in chemistry and biology. Biedron was often in Sweden for her graduate studies at Lund University.

Her dissertation was in accelerator physics with an emphasis on the generation of coherent, laser-like light sources often known as free-electron laser.

== Research and career ==
In 1993, Biedron joined the Argonne National Laboratory. Her research includes the development of coherent, laser-like light sources. Biedron was eventually appointed as an Associate Director of the Argonne Accelerator Institute and the Department of Defense Project Office. At Argonne, Biedron helped to develop the self-amplified spontaneous emission free-electron laser in the visible wavelengths as well as the Advanced Photon Source. She also oversaw and participated in experiments in high-gain harmonic generation free-electron lasers at the Accelerator Test Facility at Brookhaven National Laboratory. She worked on the Office of Naval Research free-electron laser and the FERMI@ELETTRA free-electron laser at Elettra Sincrotrone Trieste.

Biedron's work on the high-gain harmonic generation free-electron lasers and other coherent devices helped drive the FERMI free electron laser at ELETTRA and other machine architectures.

Biedron moved to Colorado State University in 2011. In 2017, Biedron moved to the University of New Mexico, where she is involved with expanding reach in applied electromagnetism and accelerator technologies. She also serves as the Director of Knowledge Transfer at the Center for Bright Beams.

Her research interests include energy-relevant systems (particle accelerator systems, laser systems, and their application for materials), the use of artificial intelligence in controls, modeling, and prediction of complex systems, including for quantum information systems, sensors and detectors, and applications of these technologies in science, security, and defense. Biedron is active in global security concerns, including dual-use technologies. In September 2021, she addressed artificial intelligence and machine learning for the control of complex systems in the Electric Power Research Institute's AI and electric power summit. On 28 September 2021, the U.S. patent number 11,131,106 was awarded to Biedron for construction equipment for use on devices such as radio-frequency (RF) "radio" towers. Biedron is active in the LANL experiment CCM (Coherent Captain Mills) at the Lujan center to search for sterile neutrinos, dark matter and axions. Her expertise on accelerators is being applied to test a new short pulse configuration for the LANSCE PSR, which if successful would be critical to reducing non-relativistic beam backgrounds. In 2022, Biedron gave a talk, "Accelerator Development for Global Security", at the XXXI International Linear Accelerator Conference, Liverpool, UK. Also in 2022, Biedron served as an invited speaker and panel member at two events – at the Sustainability Summit at SEMICON West (San Francisco, California, 13 July 2022) "Opportunity to Innovate: Five Opportunities for Collaborative Innovation for Decarbonized Discovery, Innovation, Design and Manufacturing," and at the International Particle Accelerator Conference, Bangkok, Thailand, 15 June 2022 "Present status and opportunities for implementing disruptive technologies arising in particle accelerator R&D industrial market.".

During the COVID-19 pandemic, the Advanced Photon Source developed by Biedron and co-workers was used to analyze and generate a detailed model of the SARS-CoV-2 virus.

== Awards and honors ==
- 2008 SPIE Women in Optics Planner
- 2010 Chief of Naval Research Letter of Commendation
- 2012 Elected Fellow of SPIE
- 2013 Colorado State University George T. Abell Outstanding Mid-Career Faculty Award
- 2013 Elected Fellow of the American Physical Society
- 2015 Inducted into District 230's Legacy Hall
- 2018 Institute of Electrical and Electronics Engineers Particle Accelerator Science and Technology Prize
- 2020 Moraine Valley Community College Alumni Hall of Fame

== Selected publications ==
- L.-H. Yu; M. Babzien; Ben-Zvi, Ilan; et al. (2000). "High-gain harmonic-generation free-electron laser". Science. 289 (5481): 932–935. Bibcode:2000Sci...289..932Y. doi:10.1126/science.289.5481.932. PMID 10937992. Wikidata Q30652620.
- Milton SV; Gluskin E; Arnold ND; et al. (2001). "Exponential gain and saturation of a self-amplified spontaneous emission free-electron laser". Science. 292 (5524): 2037–2041. doi:10.1126/science.1059955. PMID 11358995. Wikidata Q29398059.
- Allaria, E.; Appio, R.; Badano, L. (2012). "Highly coherent and stable pulses from the FERMI seeded free-electron laser in the extreme ultraviolet". Nature Photonics. 6 (10): 699–704. Bibcode:2012NaPho...6..699A. doi:10.1038/nphoton.2012.233. S2CID 120228185.

== Personal life ==
Biedron is married to Stephen Val Milton, with whom she has one son Sebastian Milton. She is interested in architecture and since 2014 has owned the Ingersoll-Blackwelder House at 10910 S. Prospect in Chicago. Biedron continues to oversee the restoration of the property. It was once owned by a community activity who was the first woman to cast a vote in Cook County, Illinois. Alongside her historic house, Biedron owns two vintage sports cars and a Diamond DA40 Diamond Star aircraft. She is involved with the curation of the steamer trunks and monogrammed linens that were brought by Enrico Fermi and his family on the voyage on the Cunard Line's RMS Franconia when they fled Europe to avoid Fascist Italy.

Biedron serves as a trustee of the National Museum of Nuclear Science and History. Based on her efforts in preservation including architecture, she was admitted to the Cliff Dwellers Club of Chicago dedicated to people supporting the arts.
