= Paul Fenter =

- Education: University of Pennsylvania, Rensselaer Polytechnic Institute
- Employer: Argonne National Laboratory
- Known for: Studies of interfacial structure and dynamics; The development of novel X-ray techniques.
- Awards: Bertram E. Warren Diffraction Physics Award, Fellow of the American Physical Society, UChicago Distinguished Performance Award
- Website: https://www.anl.gov/profile/paul-a-fenter

Paul Fenter is a senior physicist, Argonne Distinguished Fellow, and leader for Interfacial Processes Group, in the Chemical Sciences and Engineering Division at the U.S. Department of Energy's (DOE) Argonne National Laboratory and the former director of the Center for Electrochemical Energy Science (CEES), a DOE Energy Frontier Research Center.

== Education and Career Overview ==
Fenter holds a PhD from the University of Pennsylvania and a bachelor of science degree in physics from Rensselaer Polytechnic Institute. He did his postdoctoral studies at Princeton University then joined Argonne in 1997 as a physicist. Fenter has led the Interfacial Processes group since 2000 and was promoted to senior physicist in 2007. Fenter became director of the Center for Electrochemical Energy Science in 2014. While under his leadership (2014-2020), CEES contributed several new insights on the behavior of cathodes in lithium-ion batteries, and was recognized by the DOE for making a pivotal discovery in battery technology. Fenter was named an Argonne Distinguished Fellow in 2023. Fenter is also an adjunct professor at the University of Illinois at Chicago and a Senior Scientist at Large from 2020 to 2022 in the UChicago Consortium for Advanced Science and Engineering.

== Research Overview ==
Fenter's research has centered on understanding the structure and reactivity of solid-liquid interfaces through direct in-situ and operando studies. Such interfaces are pervasive in natural and engineered systems (e.g., geochemical interfaces of minerals in the natural environment, electrode-electrolyte interfaces in energy storage and catalytic systems, etc.) but are generally poorly understood due to the paucity of tools that can probe such interfaces at the conditions of interest. His work has led to new advances in understanding of these systems including: the presence of interfacial hydration layers at solid-water interfaces, the complex behavior of ions at charged solid-liquid interfaces (e.g., including the coexistence of multiple discrete ion adsorption states), and the role of interfacial reactivity in controlling lithium-ion battery conversion reactions. Fenter also specializes in development of novel X-ray-based techniques to understand the structure and reactivity at liquid-solid interfaces.

As the director of CEES, Fenter led a multi-institutional research program (with partners at Northwestern University, University of Illinois and Purdue University) that studied the chemical reactions that limit the lifetime and safety of lithium-ion batteries (LIBs). This included studies of the interface between electrodes and the electrolytes, and approaches to stabilize the electrode-electrolyte interface. CEES also explored novel "beyond lithium ion insertion" chemistries that can lead to substantial increases in the energy storage capacity of LIBs.

For his contributions, Fenter was awarded the 2012 Bertram E. Warren Diffraction Physics Award from the American Crystallographic Association and The University of Chicago's Board of Governors Distinguished Performance Award in 2018. He was also named a fellow of the American Physical Society in 2008 and is a member of the American Chemical Society, and Geochemical Society.

== Research Areas ==
=== Understanding mineral interactions with water ===
Fenter uses X-ray based approaches to understand the structure and reactivity of liquid-solid interfaces found in natural systems. The interactions between water, dissolved ions, and minerals are fundamental to many chemical processes, like ion exchange and environmental transport. Fenter has leveraged X-ray approaches to uncover new details about the structure of water at the interface, and the arrangement of ions at charged mineral-water interfaces known as the "electrical double layer".

=== Advances in lithium ion battery electrode interfaces ===
As the director of CEES, Fenter led a multi-institutional research program (with partners at Northwestern University, University of Illinois and Purdue University) that studied the chemical reactions that limit the lifetime and safety of lithium ion batteries (LIBs). This included studies of the interface between electrodes and the electrolytes, and approaches to stabilize the electrode-electrolyte interface. CEES also explored novel "beyond lithium ion insertion" chemistries that can lead to substantial increases in the energy storage capacity of LIBs.

=== Enhancing X-rays methods for interfacial studies ===
Fenter has extended the capabilities of X-ray scattering, spectroscopy, and microscopy techniques for analyzing interfacial processes. One example is the demonstration of "model-independent imaging" as a conceptual approach for visualizing the distribution of an element near interfaces through the use of phase-sensitive measurements (including resonant anomalous X-ray reflectivity and X-ray standing waves). These capabilities enabled new insights into ion adsorption structures, and been also applied to studies of mineral-water dynamics. He also invented a novel X-ray microscope that can image sub-nanometer high interfacial topography and dissolution dynamics. Most recently, he has demonstrated a new general solution to the phase problem for the case of coherently illuminated atomistic structures.

== Honors ==
- Argonne Distinguished Fellow, 2023
- Board of University of Chicago's Governors' Distinguished Performance Award, 2018
- Bertram E. Warren Diffraction Physics Award from the American Crystallographic Association, 2012
- Named Fellow of the American Physical Society, 2008
