= Kawtar Hafidi =

Moroccan-American experimental nuclear physicist

- كوثر حفيظي
- Born: 1972 (age 53–54); Rabat, Morocco
- Education: PhD., 1999, University of Paris-Sud; B.S., Theoretical Physics, 1995, Mohammed V University
- Scientific career
- Fields: Physics
- Workplaces: Argonne National Laboratory; United States Department of Energy
- Thesis: Measurement of tensor polarization in elastic electron deuteron scattering at large momentum transfer

Kawtar Hafidi (Arabic: كوثر حفيظي) is a Moroccan-American experimental nuclear physicist and the Associate Laboratory Director for Physical Sciences and Engineering at Argonne National Laboratory. She researches nucleon and nuclear structure using major accelerator facilities, e.g., Jefferson Lab, DESY, and Fermilab. She is also an advocate for diversity and almost became a professional soccer player when she was 16.

== Early life and education ==
Raised as a devout Muslim in Morocco's capital, Rabat, Hafidi showed an early curiosity of the theoretical. "When I was little," she says, "I used to tell my dad, 'I want to learn what God is made of. I believe in him, but I don't see him.'" Hafidi was nudged towards a career in science by her father. When she had to decide between science and literature in ninth grade, her father, a middle-class bureaucrat in the Moroccan government, told her: "What will you do with literature? It's not useful to the country. Since you are good at everything, you should do science." Drawing on her talent for solving rigorous logical problems that she developed during her high school training, Hafidi completed her bachelor's degree in theoretical physics at Mohammed V. University in 1995 in Rabat, Morocco.

In her interview for CNN Arabia (2017), Hafidi recalls the doctorate holders strike due to lack of jobs in 1995, in which the state responded to their demands by closing graduate schools, forcing Hafidi to travel to France to complete her graduate studies. However, her father didn't have the money to send her to college abroad. Luckily, her grandmother and aunts—the youngest of whom is a physician—came up with the funds, in some cases by selling jewelry. "They would say, 'We cannot let you waste your talent here,' " she says. She continued her studies at University Paris-Sud where she studied the electromagnetic structure of the Deuterium to receive her PhD in 1999.

Hafidi was a member of the original Moroccan national women's soccer team, in 1992, and has a brown belt in mixed martial-arts fighting.

Hafidi met her husband, Brahim, a Tunisian physicist, in Paris. The couple married in 1998, moved together to the US where they both work as physicists in Argonne National Laboratory. They had a son, Omar, in 2005. In an Interview with Patch (2011), Illinois, Hafidi talks about her work-life balance saying, "I think balance doesn't exist. There's only satisfaction. You try to find your own balance. You try to be satisfied with your choices. I'm still struggling with work/life balance, but what helps me a lot is my husband." She reveals that her husband is the primary caretaker of their son and acknowledges his support.

== Career ==
Hafidi first joined Argonne National Laboratory as a postdoc (1999–2002) and moved on to become an assistant physicist (2002–2006) and a physicist (since 2006). As a leading researcher at Argonne National Laboratory, Hafidi has been "asking philosophical questions, addressing technical fields in detector and software development." Expanding on her research interest of understanding the dynamics of subatomic particles (nucleons) and the forces by which they are held together, Hafidi collaborates with a team of scientists to study 3-D distributions of partons (subatomic quarks and gluons) in nucleons and nuclei, by using particle accelerators at Thomas Jefferson National Accelerator Facility in Virginia, Fermilab in Illinois, and DESY in Hamburg Germany. Hafidi seeks to capture the moment when quarks become free, or transparent. Adjusting the accelerator's speed and intensity, her team found conclusive evidence of an exotic, short-lived state in which quarks are so small they become invisible to other matter, enabling them to pass through a nuclear medium without interaction. She was elected as a member of Jefferson Lab users group board of directors in 2010.

She briefly left Argonne in 2013 to work for the Department of Energy, Office of Nuclear Physics. In 2015, she returned as the Associate Chief Scientist for Laboratory Directed Research and Development at Argonne National Laboratory. In 2017, she was appointed as Director of the Physics Division, and additionally in 2018 as Associate Laboratory Director for Physical Science and Engineering.

Hafidi also leads Argonne's Women in Science and Technology (WIST) program. The WIST program provides leadership and resources to help advance the success of women, encourages professional growth and development and works to promote diversity at all levels within Argonne to create a premier institution for research and development. She was also the chair of the American Physical Society's Committee on Status of Women in Physics (CSWP).

== Awards ==
- 1996: Graduate Research Fellowship, The French Atomic Agency
- 2010: Outstanding Mentor Award, U. S. DOE Office of Science
- 2011: Innovator Award, Association for Women in Science
- 2012: Pinnacle of Education Award, University of Chicago & Argonne LLC
- 2014: Diversity Award, Argonne Women in Science and Technology

== Professional activities ==
- 2007–2015: Argonne National Laboratory Women in Science and Technology, Steering Committee
- 2009–2012: Member of the APS Committee on the Status of Women in Physics
- 2010–2012: Argonne National Laboratory Women in Science and Technology program initiator
- 2010–2012: Board of Directors, Jefferson Lab Users' Group
- 2011–2012: Chair of the APS Committee on the Status of Women in Physics
- 2012–2014: Member of the Jefferson Lab Hall C Users' Group Steering Committee
- 2012–2014: Member of the Nominating Committee for the APS Topical Group on Hadronic Physics
- 2012–present: Chair of the CLAS Collaboration Nuclear Physics Working Group
- 2013–present: Member of Argonne National Laboratory Diversity and Inclusion Council

== Major publications ==
- Airapetian, A.; Akopov, N.; Akopov, Z.; Amarian, M.; Andrus, A.; Aschenauer, E. C.; Augustyniak, W.; Avakian, R.; Avetissian, A. (2005-01-06). "Single-Spin Asymmetries in Semi-Inclusive Deep-Inelastic Scattering on a Transversely Polarized Hydrogen Target". Physical Review Letters. 94 (1) 012002. arXiv:hep-ex/0408013. Bibcode:2005PhRvL..94a2002A. doi:10.1103/PhysRevLett.94.012002. ISSN 0031-9007. PMID 15698069. S2CID 119080643.
- Airapetian, A.; Akopov, Z.; Amarian, M.; Andrus, A.; Aschenauer, E.C.; Augustyniak, W.; Avakian, H.; Avakian, R.; Avetissian, A. (2007). "Beam-spin asymmetries in the azimuthal distribution of pion electroproduction". Physics Letters B. 648 (2–3): 164–170. arXiv:hep-ex/0612059. Bibcode:2007PhLB..648..164H. doi:10.1016/j.physletb.2007.03.015.
- Airapetian, A.; Akopov, N.; Akopov, Z.; Amarian, M.; Aschenauer, E. C.; Avakian, H.; Avakian, R.; Avetissian, A.; Avetissian, E. (2001-10-10). "Measurement of the Beam-Spin Azimuthal Asymmetry Associated with Deeply-Virtual Compton Scattering". Physical Review Letters. 87 (18) 182001. arXiv:hep-ex/0106068. Bibcode:2001PhRvL..87r2001A. doi:10.1103/PhysRevLett.87.182001. ISSN 0031-9007. S2CID 32289439.
- Airapetian, A.; Akopov, N.; Akopov, Z.; Amarian, M.; Ammosov, V.; Andrus, A.; Aschenauer, E.; Augustyniak, W.; Avakian, R. (2005). "Quark helicity distributions in the nucleon for up, down, and strange quarks from semi-inclusive deep-inelastic scattering" (PDF). Physical Review D. 71 (1) 012003. arXiv:hep-ex/0407032. Bibcode:2005PhRvD..71a2003A. doi:10.1103/PhysRevD.71.012003. ISSN 1550-7998. S2CID 30252421.
