= Stephen Val Milton =

American-Italian Physicist

Stephen Val Milton is an American-Italian physicist. He was born in Sacramento, California on October 31, 1958. He serves as the Vice President for Accelerator Science at Tau Systems.

In 1990, Milton received his PhD in physics from Cornell University following an MS in physics also from Cornell University in 1988. He received his B.S. in physics from the University of California - Davis.

He is a Fellow of the American Physical Society, Division of the Physics of Beams and the IEEE as well as a member of the IEEE's Nuclear and Plasma Sciences Society (NPSS)

In 2003, Milton worked for Argonne National Labs and was appointed to lead the ANL contribution to the Linac Coherent Light Source (LCLS) at the Stanford Linear Accelerator Center. That same year he won the IEEE NPSS Particle Accelerator Science and Technology (PAST) award

Milton was awarded the 2027 Wilson Prize for Particle Accelerators, "For fundamental contributions to the development of X-ray free-electron lasers, including the first demonstration of saturated self-amplified spontaneous emission, and for leadership in the design and construction of the FERMI facility at the Elettra Sincrotrone Trieste in Italy, the world’s first seeded free-electron laser facility.”

== Personal Life ==
Milton is married to Sandra Biedron with whom he shares one son, Sebastian
