= Eric Isaacs =

American physicist

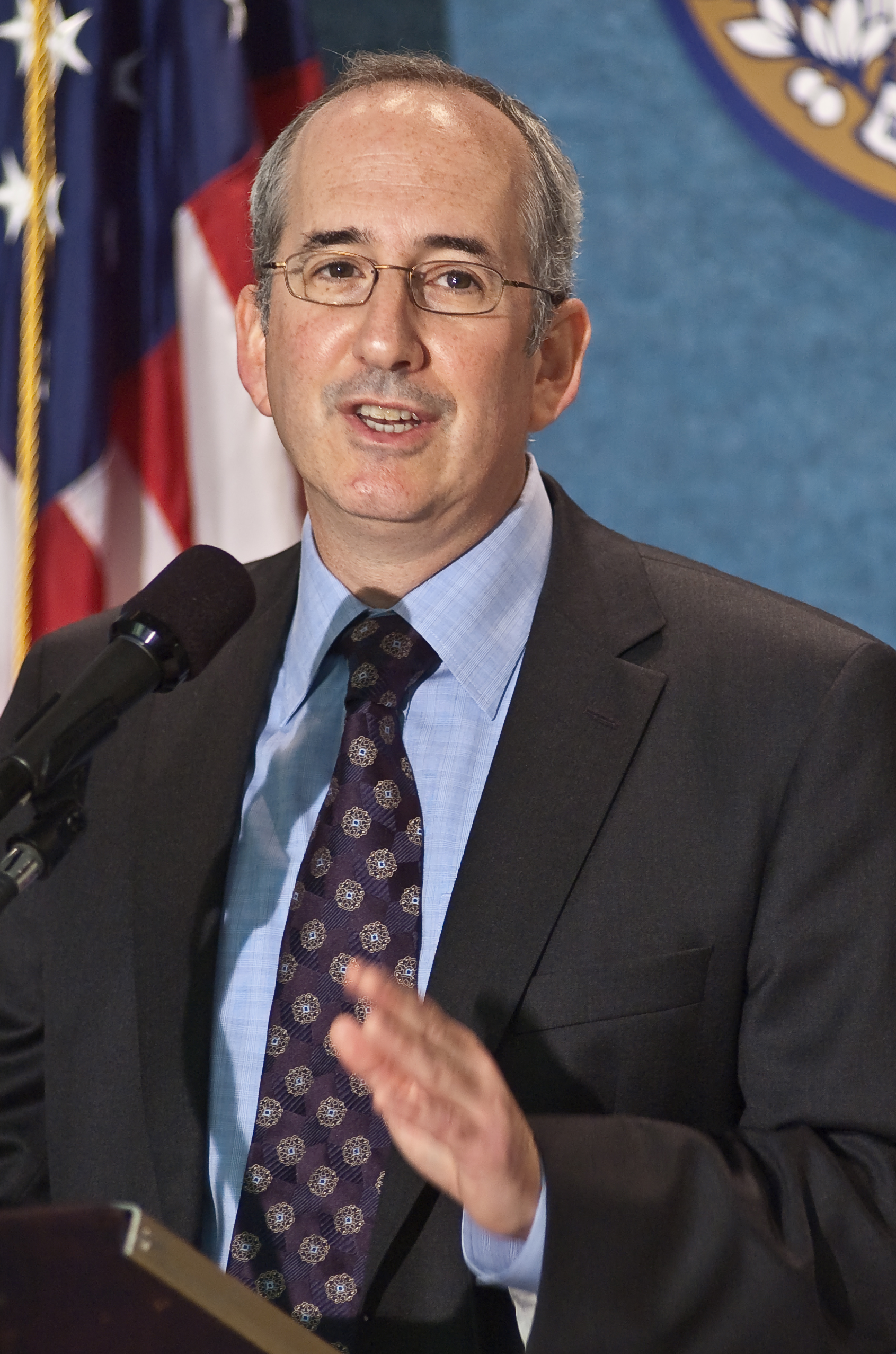
- Isaacs speaking at a press conference at the National Press Club in 2009
- Born: c. 1960 (age c. 65)
- Education: Massachusetts Institute of Technology (PhD)

Eric Isaacs (born c. 1960) is an American physicist who serves as president and CEO of the Research Corporation for Science Advancement and is the President-Elect of the American Association for the Advancement of Science. He previously served as 11th President of the Carnegie Institution for Science where he oversaw the research and business functions across six research departments on the East and West coasts and observatories in Chile until stepping down in October 2024.

Isaacs spent many years at the University of Chicago from which he departed in July 2018 as the Robert A. Millikan Distinguished Service Professor in physics and the James Franck Institute Executive Vice President for Research, Innovation and National Laboratories. From 2014 to 2016, he served as provost of the university. Prior to that he was director of Argonne National Laboratory for five years, where he had been since 2003, with a joint appointment in the university’s physics department.

Previously he worked for 15 years at Bell Labs, including serving as director of the Semiconductor Physics Research and Materials Physics Research Departments. At Bell Labs, Isaacs developed synchrotron-based X-ray-scattering techniques, including inelastic X-ray scattering and X-ray microscopy that continue to play an important role in materials and nanoscale scientific research.

Isaacs’ research interests are in condensed matter physics and quantum materials. He earned his bachelor of science degree from Beloit College in 1979 and a PhD in physics from MIT in 1988. He has published more than 150 scholarly articles.
