= NEOS Server =

The NEOS Server is an Internet-based client-server application that provides free access to a library of optimization solvers. Its library of solvers includes more than 60 commercial, free and open source solvers, which can be applied to mathematical optimization problems of more than 12 different types, including linear programming, integer programming and nonlinear optimization.

The server is managed by the Wisconsin Institute for Discovery at the University of Wisconsin-Madison. Most of the solvers are hosted by the University of Wisconsin in Madison, where jobs run on a cluster of high-performance machines managed by the HTCondor software. A smaller number of solvers are hosted by partner organizations: Arizona State University, the University of Klagenfurt in Austria, and the University of Minho in Portugal. The server was developed in 1996 by the Optimization Technology Center of Argonne National Laboratory and Northwestern University.

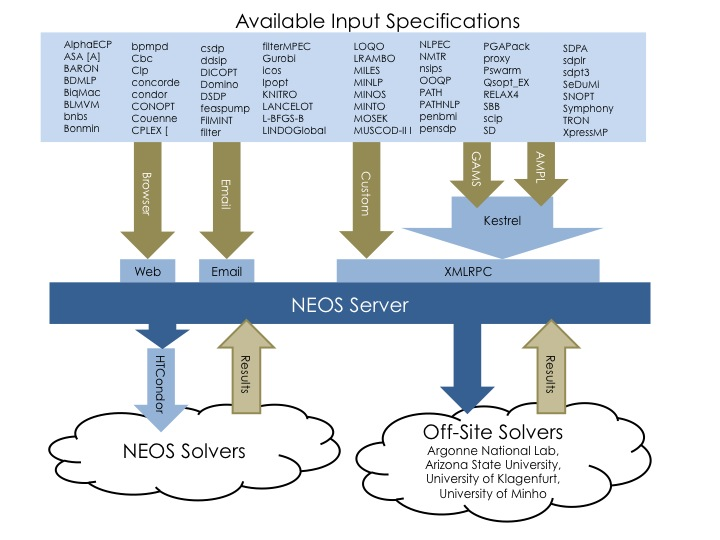
Graphical depiction of the structure of the NEOS Server

== Structure ==
The NEOS (Network-Enabled Optimization System) project was launched in at Argonne National Laboratory and Northwestern University to develop a method to share optimization software resources over the Internet. The server went live in 1996, one of the first examples of software as a service.

The NEOS Server is an Internet-based client-server application that provides access to a library of optimization solvers. The server accepts optimization models described in modeling languages, programming languages, and problem-specific formats. Most of the linear programming, integer programming and nonlinear programming solvers accept input from AMPL and/or GAMS. Jobs can be submitted via a web page, email, XML RPC, Kestrel or indirectly via third party submission tools SolverStudio for Excel, OpenSolver, Pyomo, JuMP (through the Julia package NEOS) and the R package rneos. NEOS uses the HTCondor software to manage the workload on a dedicated cluster of computers.
