= Gilbert Jerome Perlow =

American physicist (1916–2007)

- Born: 10 February 1916; New York City
- Died: 17 February 2007 (aged 91)
- Citizenship: American
- Education: Cornell University; University of Chicago
- Known for: His work on Mössbauer effect and in cosmic ray research. Editor of Journal of Applied Physics and Applied Physics Letters.
- Scientific career
- Fields: Cosmic rays
- Workplaces: Argonne National Laboratory

Gilbert Jerome Perlow (10 February 1916 – 17 February 2007), was an American physicist famous for his work related to the Mössbauer effect, and an editor of the Journal of Applied Physics and Applied Physics Letters.

== Life ==
Perlow was born in New York City in 1916, and attended Townsend Harris Hall. At 16, he went to study medicine at Cornell University. However, he later switched to physics, as he said his talents did not lie in medicine. He obtained his bachelor's degree in 1936 at Cornell University. His graduate thesis On measurements of L_{α} satellite x rays was supervised by Floyd K. Richtmyer. He obtained his PhD from University of Chicago in 1940, where researched nuclear reactions of lithium-6. There he met his wife Mina Rea Jones, a chemist, when looking for assistance in building lithium targets.

After his PhD thesis, he left Chicago to work for the Naval Ordnance Laboratory and the US Naval Research Laboratory, on the detection of submarine using ultrasounds as part of the war effort. After the war, he used and modified captured V-2 rockets to make measurements on atmospheric cosmic rays, leading him to propose that most gamma rays in the atmosphere were not the cosmic rays themselves, but were rather due to Compton backscattering.

In 1952, he became a faculty member at University of Minnesota. In 1954, he moved to Illinois to work at the Argonne National Laboratory, until he retired in 1981. In 1970, he became editor of the Journal of Applied Physics and Applied Physics Letters.

In the words of John Schiffer and Charles Johnson, Perlow was a "...witty and cultured man, he enjoyed reading, sketching, listening to music, and sailing his yacht on Lake Michigan."

== Work ==
Other than his work on cosmic rays, and on the Mössbauer effect, Perlow worked on the hyperfine structure of iron-57 and other properties of iron atoms, such as their internal magnetic field.
