= Morton Hamermesh =

American physicist (1915–2003)

Morton Hamermesh (27 December 1915 – 14 November 2003) was an American physicist.

Hamermesh was a native of Brooklyn, born on 27 December 1915. He studied mathematics at the City College of New York. After graduating in 1936, Hamermesh enrolled at New York University for a PhD, which he completed in 1940. His thesis, directed by Otto Halpern, was The Passage of Neutrons through Crystals and Polycrystals.

Hamermesh joined Felix Bloch at Stanford University as a postdoctoral researcher. Upon leaving Bloch's research group, Hamermesh sought a leave of absence from NYU to work at Harvard University's Radio Research Laboratory. From 1945 to 1948, Hamermesh was affiliated with New York University. For the next seventeen years, he conducted research at Argonne National Laboratory, starting as associate director of the physics division until a promotion in 1959 to physics division director and associate laboratory director for leading basic research.

Hamermesh returned to academia in 1965, leading the University of Minnesota's School of Physics and Astronomy. Hamermesh's tenure in leadership at UM was interrupted in 1970, as he spent that year as physics department chair at SUNY Stony Brook. When Hamermesh returned to Minnesota he also resumed leadership of the School of Physics and Astronomy. He stepped down from the leadership position in 1975, remaining on the faculty until 1985.

Hamermesh followed and played chess. He finished sixth at the U.S. Open Chess Championship in 1945. He studied Hebrew, Mandarin, and was proficient in Russian, translating a number of physics texts from Russian to English, including The Classical Theory of Fields, part of the Course of Theoretical Physics series jointly authored by Lev Landau and Evgeny Lifshitz. He also served as editor of the Journal of Mathematical Physics from 1970 to 1978. In 1936, Hamermesh was nominated for American Mathematical Society membership. In 1946, Hamermesh was elected a fellow of the American Physical Society.

Hamermesh died in Minneapolis on 14 November 2003. He and his wife Madeline raised three children, including the economist Daniel S. Hamermesh.

== Works ==
- Hamermesh, Morton (1962). Group Theory and its Application. Pergamon Press.
- Landau, Lev; Lifshitz, Evgeny (1975). The Classical Theory of Fields (PDF). Translated by Hamermesh, Morton (4th revised ed.).
- 1986: (with Benjamin F. Bayman) A Review of Undergraduate Physics, John Wiley & Son ISBN 0-471-81684-1
