= Lynda Soderholm =

American physical chemist

- Education: McMaster University (PhD), Centre de Recherche Nucléaire
- Occupation: Physical Chemist
- Organization: Argonne National Laboratory
- Known for: studies with f-block elements
- Awards: Fellow, American Association for the Advancement of Science
- Website: https://www.anl.gov/cse/heavy-element-chemistry-and-separation-science-groups

Lynda Soderholm is a physical chemist at the U.S. Department of Energy's (DOE) Argonne National Laboratory with a specialty in f-block elements. She is a senior scientist and the lead of the Actinide, Geochemistry & Separation Sciences Theme within Argonne's Chemical Sciences and Engineering Division. Her specific role is the Separation Science group leader within Heavy Element Chemistry and Separation Science (HESS), directing basic research focused on low-energy methods for isolating lanthanide and actinide elements from complex mixtures. She has made fundamental contributions to understanding f-block chemistry and characterizing f-block elements.

Soderholm became a Fellow of the American Association for the Advancement of Science (AAAS) in 2013, and is also an Argonne Distinguished Fellow.

== Early life and education ==
Soderholm was awarded her PhD in 1982 by McMaster University under the direction of Prof John Greedan. Her dissertation focused on characterizing the structural and magnetic properties of a series of ternary f-ion oxides. After graduating, she was awarded a NATO postdoctoral fellow at the Centre national de la recherche scientifique in France from 1982 until 1985. After a short postdoctoral appointment as an Argonne postdoctoral fellow she was promoted to staff scientist the same year. Over several years, she moved up the ranks, becoming a senior chemist in 2001. She was also an adjunct professor at the University of Notre Dame from 2003 until 2007. In 2021, Soderholm was appointed interim Division Director for the Chemical Sciences and Engineering Division.

== Career and research ==
=== Uncovering structure of Yttrium-123 Superconductor ===
Early in her career, Soderholm focused on the characterizing the magnetic and electronic behavior of compounds containing f-ions (lanthanides and actinides) with a focus on high-T_{c} materials, compounds that are superconducting under usually high temperatures. She was part of the research group that first determined the structure of YBa_{2}Cu_{3}O_{7}. Their discovery formed the foundation for the further developments in the broad field of superconductivity.

=== Understanding f-ion speciation in solution ===
Continuing her interest in the f-elements, Soderholm shifted her focus from solid-state materials to nanoparticles and solutions, taking advantage of advances in X-ray structural probes made available by synchrotron facilities. Building on her earlier work using neutron scattering, her team became the first to discover that plutonium exists in solution as tiny, well-defined nanoparticles. This work solved a longstanding problem in understanding transport of plutonium in the environment and resulted in the development of a new, patented approach to separating plutonium during nuclear reprocessing.

=== Using machine learning to evaluate molecular structures ===
Soderholm's more recent projects use machine learning to understand the influence of complex molecular structuring in solutions, in connection with low-energy processes for separation of f-block elements from complex mixtures.

== Awards and honors ==
- University of Chicago Board of Governors' Distinguished Performance Award, 2009.
- Fellow of the American Association for the Advancement of Science, 2013.
- Argonne Distinguished Fellow, 2016
- DOE materials sciences research competition for Outstanding Scientific Accomplishments in Solid State Physics, 1987.

== Select publications ==
- Beno, M. A.; Soderholm, L.; Capone, D. W., II; Hinks, D. G.; Jorgensen, J. D.; Grace, J. D.; Schuller, I. K.; Segre, C. U.; Zhang, K., Structure of the single-phase high-temperature superconductor yttrium barium copper oxide (YBa_{2}Cu_{3}O_{7−δ}). Appl. Phys. Lett. 1987, 51 (1), 57–9.
- Soderholm, L.; Zhang, K.; Hinks, D. G.; Beno, M. A.; Jorgensen, J. D.; Segre, C. U.; Schuller, I. K., Incorporation of praseodymium in YBa_{2}Cu_{3}O_{7−δ}: electronic effects on superconductivity. Nature (London) 1987, 328 (6131), 604–5.
- Antonio, M. R.; Williams, C. W.; Soderholm, L., Berkelium redox speciation. Radiochim. Acta 2002, 90 (12), 851–856.
- Soderholm, L.; Skanthakumar, S.; Neuefeind, J., Determination of actinide speciation in solution using high-energy X-ray scattering. Anal. Bioanal. Chem. 2005, 383 (1), 48–55.
- Forbes, T. Z.; Burns, P. C.; Skanthakumar, S.; Soderholm, L., Synthesis, structure, and magnetism of Np_{2}O_{5}. J. Am. Chem. Soc. 2007, 129 (10), 2760–2761.
- Soderholm, L.; Almond, P. M.; Skanthakumar, S.; Wilson, R. E.; Burns, P. C., The structure of the plutonium oxide nanocluster [Pu_{38}O_{56}Cl_{54}(H_{2}O)_{8}]^{14-}. Angew. Chem., Int. Ed. 2008, 47 (2), 298–302.
- Jensen, M. P.; Gorman-Lewis, D.; Aryal, B.; Paunesku, T.; Vogt, S.; Rickert, P. G.; Seifert, S.; Lai, B.; Woloschak, G. E.; Soderholm, L., An iron-dependent and transferrin-mediated cellular uptake pathway for plutonium. Nat. Chem. Biol. 2011, 7 (8), 560–565.
- Wilson, R. E.; Skanthakumar, S.; Soderholm, L., Separation of Plutonium Oxide Nanoparticles and Colloids. Angew. Chem., Int. Ed. 2011, 50 (47), 11234–11237.
- Knope, K. E.; Soderholm, L., Solution and solid-state structural chemistry of actinide hydrates and their hydrolysis and condensation products. Chem. Rev. 2013, 113 (2), 944–994.
- Luo, G.; Bu, W.; Mihaylov, M.; Kuzmenko, I.; Schlossman, M. L.; Soderholm, L., X-ray reflectivity reveals a nonmonotonic ion-density profile perpendicular to the surface of ErCl_{3} aqueous solutions. J. Phys. Chem. C 2013, 117 (37), 19082–19090.
- Jin, G. B.; Lin, J.; Estes, S. L.; Skanthakumar, S.; Soderholm, L., Influence of countercation hydration enthalpies on the formation of molecular complexes: A thorium-nitrate example. J. Am. Chem. Soc. 2017, 139 (49), 18003–18008.

== Patents ==
- Solvent extraction system for plutonium colloids and other oxide nano-particles, (2016).
