= Stephen Turnham Pratt =

American chemist

Stephen T. Pratt
- Education: Bennington College, Yale University
- Known for: photoionization studies, combustion science
- Awards: Fellow of the American Physical Society
- Scientific career
- Fields: Chemistry
- Workplaces: Argonne National Laboratory
- Academic advisors: William A. Chupka

Stephen Turnham Pratt is a senior chemist and Argonne Distinguished Fellow (awarded 2019). He is the theme lead for CSE's Fundamental Interactions Theme and the group leader for the Gas-Phase Chemical Dynamics group. From September 2022 until July 2023, he served as the Interim Division Director for Chemical Sciences and Engineering (CSE) Division.

== Research ==
Pratt's research focuses on photoionization and photodissociation dynamics to understand how energy flows among the internal degrees of freedom in highly energized molecules. His experimental research program involves using laboratory-based lasers for multiphoton excitation and pump-probe experiments, and in using synchrotron sources for single-photon photoabsorption and photoionization studies of small molecules.

== Education and career ==
Pratt received his BA in Chemistry from Bennington College, his MS, MPhil, and PhD in Chemistry from Yale University under the direction of William A. Chupka, and after graduation in 1982, he joined Argonne National Laboratory as a postdoctoral appointee working with Patricia A. Dehmer. He has published more than 150 journal articles, and in 1995 was named a Fellow in the American Physical Society. He was nominated by the Division of Atomic, Molecular & Optical Physics, for "fundamental contributions to molecular physics through imaginative and innovative studies that probe electron-nuclear coupling, and, in particular, for his elegant experiments on molecular photoionization, predissociation, autoionization, and excited-state reactions."

== Representative publications ==
- Young, L.; Kanter, E. P.; Krässig, B.; Li, Y.; March, A. M.; Pratt, S. T.; Santra, R.; Southworth, S. H.; Rohringer, N.; Dimauro, L. F.; Doumy, G.; Roedig, C. A.; Berrah, N.; Fang, L.; Hoener, M.; Bucksbaum, P. H.; Cryan, J. P.; Ghimire, S.; Glownia, J. M.; Reis, D. A.; Bozek, J. D.; Bostedt, C.; Messerschmidt, M. (2010). "Femtosecond electronic response of atoms to ultra-intense X-rays". Nature. 466 (7302): 55–66. Bibcode:2010Natur.466...56Y. doi:10.1038/nature09177. PMID 20596013. S2CID 205221300.
- Hoener, M.; Fang, L.; Kornilov, O.; Gessner, O.; Pratt, S. T.; Gühr, M.; Kanter, E. P.; Blaga, C.; Bostedt, C.; Bozek, J. D.; Bucksbaum, P. H.; Buth, C.; Chen, M.; Coffee, R.; Cryan, J.; Dimauro, L.; Glownia, M.; Hosler, E.; Kukk, E.; Leone, S. R.; McFarland, B.; Messerschmidt, M.; Murphy, B.; Petrovic, V.; Rolles, D.; Berrah, N. (2010). "Ultraintense X-Ray Induced Ionization, Dissociation, and Frustrated Absorption in Molecular Nitrogen". Physical Review Letters. 104 (25) 253002. Bibcode:2010PhRvL.104y3002H. doi:10.1103/PhysRevLett.104.253002. hdl:1811/47976. PMID 20867372. S2CID 28190205.
- Dehmer, P. M.; Pratt, S. T. (1982). "Photoionization of Argon Clusters". Journal of Chemical Physics. 76 (2): 843–853. Bibcode:1982JChPh..76..843D. doi:10.1063/1.443056.
- "Electric-Field Effects in the Near-Threshold Photoionization Spectrum of Nitric Oxide". Journal of Chemical Physics. 98 (12): 9241–9250. 1993. doi:10.1063/1.46440.
- Taatjes, Craig A.; Osborn, David L.; Selby, Talitha M.; Meloni, Giovanni; Fan, Haiyan; Pratt, Stephen T. (2008). "Absolute photoionization cross-section of the methyl radical". Journal of Physical Chemistry A. 112 (39): 9336–9343. doi:10.1021/jp8022937. PMID 18572896.

== See also ==
- List of fellows of the American Physical Society (1972–1997)
