= Maury C. Goodman =

American experimental particle physicist

Maury C. Goodman is an American experimental particle physicist at the Argonne National Laboratory. He earned his undergraduate degree at the Massachusetts Institute of Technology (1972) and his PhD (1979) at the University of Illinois, Urbana-Champaign under the supervision of Albert Wattenberg.

He joined Argonne National Laboratory in 1984, and worked on proton decay and neutrino physics. Participated in the MINOS, NOvA and Double Chooz collaborations, and served for seven years as Leader of the ANL-HEP Neutrino Group. He has been Deputy Spokesperson of the LBNE collaboration (2010 to present).

When the Deep Underground Neutrino Experiment was established in 2015, he was elected the chair of the Institutional Board. He was named a Fellow of the American Physical Society in 2008 for his work in experimental neutrino physics, "especially the initiation of worldwide programs of accelerator long-baseline neutrino oscillation experiments and of the new generation of reactor experiments to measure the theta-13 neutrino mixing parameter".
