= Track Imaging Cherenkov Experiment =

Cosmic ray telescope

- Location: Illinois
- Coordinates: 41°42′13″N 87°58′10″W
- Website: www.hep.anl.gov/trice/
- Location within the United States

The Track Imaging Cherenkov Experiment (TrICE) is a ground-based cosmic ray telescope located at Argonne National Laboratory near Chicago, IL. The telescope, which contains a Fresnel lens, eight spherical mirrors, and a camera with 16 multianode photomultiplier tubes, uses the atmospheric Cherenkov imaging technique to detect Cherenkov radiation produced when cosmic rays interact with particles in the Earth's atmosphere.

The telescope is primarily a research and development tool for improving photomultiplier tube cameras and electronic systems for future gamma and cosmic ray telescopes. It is also used to study the energy and composition of cosmic rays in the TeV–PeV range, and the collaboration is currently conducting pioneering work in detecting direct Cherenkov signals from cosmic rays.

== The TrICE Collaboration ==
- Argonne National Laboratory
- University of Chicago
- University of Utah
