= Katrin Heitmann =

German-American cosmologist

- Scientific career
- Fields: Computational Cosmology
- Workplaces: Los Alamos National Laboratory LSST Dark Energy Science Collaboration Argonne National Laboratory

Dr. Katrin Heitmann is a German cosmologist whose research involves large-scale computer simulations of the universe, focused on understanding its distribution of matter and rate of expansion. She is a Deputy Division Director of High Energy Physics at the Argonne National Laboratory, the former spokesperson of the LSST Dark Energy Science Collaboration, a senior associate of the Kavli Institute for Cosmological Physics at the University of Chicago, and an affiliate of the Northwestern-Argonne Institute of Science and Engineering at Northwestern University (NAISE).

== Education and career ==
Heitmann has a 2000 Ph.D. from the Technical University of Dortmund. Her dissertation, Non-equilibrium dynamics of symmetry breaking and gauge fields in quantum field theory, was supervised by Jürgen Baacke. She became a researcher at the Los Alamos National Laboratory from 2000 to 2011, when she moved to her present position at Argonne. While working at Argonne she was the lead researcher in an effort to move three of the largest cosmological simulations known, consisting of 2.9 petabytes of gathered data, on the cloud.

== Recognition ==
In 2023, she was elected as a Fellow of the American Physical Society (APS), after a nomination from the APS Division of Astrophysics, "for pioneering the development of innovative and novel techniques in cosmic simulations for the era of precision cosmology, and for providing sustained scientific leadership, specifically within LSST DESC".
