= Intense Pulsed Neutron Source =

Intense Pulsed Neutron Source (IPNS) was a scientific user facility at Argonne National Laboratory for neutron scattering research. The IPNS was the world's first pulsed neutron source open to external users and started operations in 1981. The facility ceased operation in January, 2008 after the omnibus spending bill forced Basic Energy Sciences (BES) to cease IPNS operations.
