= Argonne National Laboratory =

Research laboratory in Illinois, US

Coordinates: 41.709166°N 87.981992°W

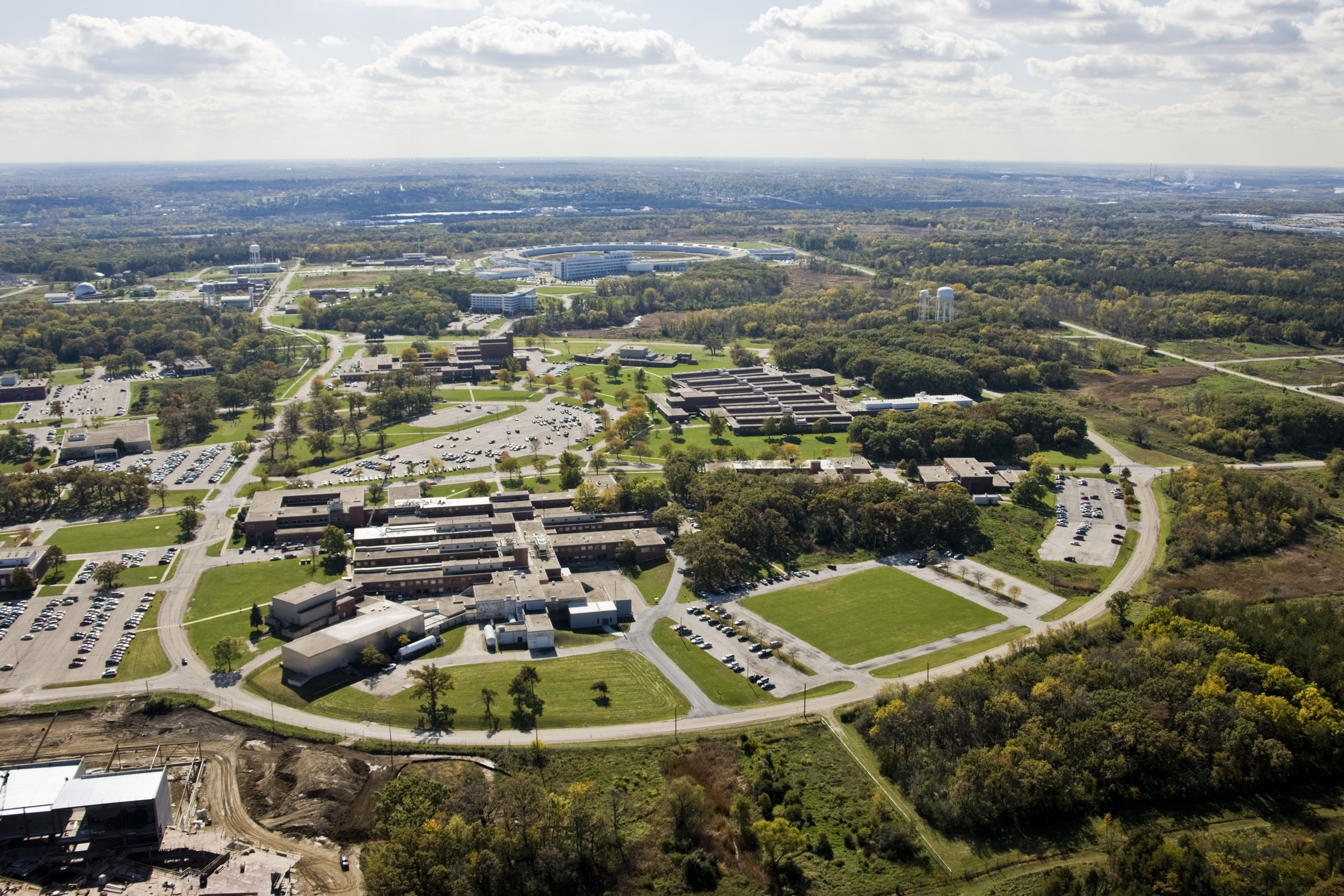
- Aerial view of Argonne National Laboratory
- Established: February 8, 1946; 80 years ago
- Research type: Research
- Budget: $1.1 billion (2022)
- Field of research: Physical science Life science Environmental science Energy science Photon science Data science Computational science
- Director: Paul Kearns
- Staff: 3400
- Location: 9700 S. Cass Avenue, Lemont address, Downers Grove Township, Illinois, U.S.
- Campus: 1,700 acres (6.9 km^{2})
- Affiliations: United States Department of Energy
- Operating agency: University of Chicago (via UChicago Argonne LLC)
- Nobel laureates: Enrico Fermi; Maria Goeppert Mayer; Alexei Alexeyevich Abrikosov
- Website: anl.gov

Argonne National Laboratory (ANL) is a federally funded research and development center in the Downers Grove Township of DuPage County, Illinois, United States, with a Lemont address. Founded in 1946, the laboratory is sponsored by the United States Department of Energy and operated by the University of Chicago through its subordinate UChicago Argonne LLC. It is the largest national laboratory in the Midwestern United States.

Argonne had its beginnings in the Metallurgical Laboratory of the University of Chicago, formed in part to carry out Enrico Fermi's work on nuclear reactors for the Manhattan Project during World War II. After the war, it was designated as the first national laboratory in the United States on July 1, 1946. In its first decades, the laboratory was a hub for peaceful use of nuclear physics; nearly all operating commercial nuclear power plants around the world have roots in Argonne research. More than 1,000 scientists conduct research at the laboratory, in the fields of energy storage and renewable energy; fundamental research in physics, chemistry, and materials science; environmental sustainability; supercomputing; and national security.

Argonne formerly ran a smaller facility called Argonne National Laboratory-West (or simply Argonne-West) in Idaho next to the Idaho National Engineering and Environmental Laboratory. In 2005, the two Idaho-based laboratories merged to become the Idaho National Laboratory.

Argonne is a part of the expanding Illinois Technology and Research Corridor. Fermilab, which is another national laboratory by the United States Department of Energy, is located approximately 20 miles (32 km) away.

== Overview ==
Argonne has five areas of focus, as stated by the laboratory in 2022, including scientific discovery in physical and life sciences; energy and climate research; global security advances to protect society; operating research facilities that support thousands of scientists and engineers from around the world; and developing the scientific and technological workforce.

== History ==
=== Origins ===
Argonne began in 1942 as the Metallurgical Laboratory, part of the Manhattan Project at the University of Chicago. The Met Lab built Chicago Pile-1, the world's first nuclear reactor, under the stands of the University of Chicago sports stadium. In 1943, CP-1 was reconstructed as CP-2, in the Argonne Forest, a forest preserve location outside Chicago. The laboratory facilities built here became known as Site A.

On July 1, 1946, Site A of the "Metallurgical Laboratory" was formally re-chartered as Argonne National Laboratory for "cooperative research in nucleonics." At the request of the U.S. Atomic Energy Commission, it began developing nuclear reactors for the nation's peaceful nuclear energy program. In the late 1940s and early 1950s, the laboratory moved west to a larger location in unincorporated DuPage County and established a remote location in Idaho, called "Argonne-West," to conduct further nuclear research.

=== Early research ===
The lab's early efforts focused on developing designs and materials for producing electricity from nuclear reactions. The laboratory designed and built Chicago Pile 3 (1944), the world's first heavy-water moderated reactor, and the Experimental Breeder Reactor I (Chicago Pile 4) in Idaho, which lit a string of four light bulbs with the world's first nuclear-generated electricity in 1951. The BWR power station reactor, now the second most popular design worldwide, came from the BORAX experiments.

The knowledge gained from the Argonne experiments was the foundation for the designs of most of the commercial reactors used throughout the world for electric power generation, and inform the current evolving designs of liquid-metal reactors for future power stations.

Meanwhile, the laboratory was also helping to design the reactor for the world's first nuclear-powered submarine, the U.S.S. Nautilus, which steamed for more than 513,550 nautical miles (951,090 km) and provided a basis for the United States' nuclear navy.

Not all nuclear technology went into developing reactors, however. While designing a scanner for reactor fuel elements in 1957, Argonne physicist William Nelson Beck put his own arm inside the scanner and obtained one of the first ultrasound images of the human body. Remote manipulators designed to handle radioactive materials laid the groundwork for more complex machines used to clean up contaminated areas, sealed laboratories or caves.

In addition to nuclear work, the laboratory performed basic research in physics and chemistry. In 1955, Argonne chemists co-discovered the elements einsteinium and fermium, elements 99 and 100 in the periodic table.

=== 1960–1995 ===
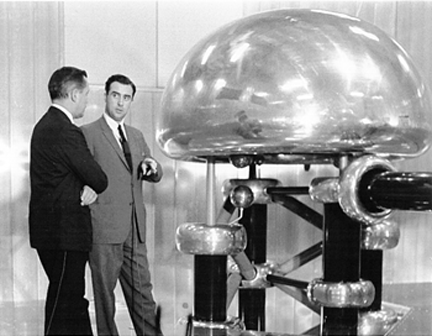
Albert Crewe (right), Argonne's third director, stands next to the Zero Gradient Synchrotron's Cockcroft–Walton generator

In 1962, Argonne chemists produced the first compound of the inert noble gas xenon, opening up a new field of chemical bonding research. In 1963, they discovered the hydrated electron.

Argonne was chosen as the site of the 12.5 GeV Zero Gradient Synchrotron, a proton accelerator that opened in 1963. A bubble chamber allowed scientists to track the motions of subatomic particles as they zipped through the chamber; they later observed the neutrino in a hydrogen bubble chamber for the first time.

In 1964, the "Janus" reactor opened to study the effects of neutron radiation on biological life, providing research for guidelines on safe exposure levels for workers at power plants, laboratories and hospitals. Scientists at Argonne pioneered a technique to analyze the Moon's surface using alpha radiation, which launched aboard the Surveyor 5 in 1967 and later analyzed lunar samples from the Apollo 11 mission.

In 1978, the Argonne Tandem Linac Accelerator System (ATLAS) opened as the world's first superconducting accelerator for projectiles heavier than the electron.

Nuclear engineering experiments during this time included the Experimental Boiling Water Reactor, the forerunner of many modern nuclear plants, and Experimental Breeder Reactor II (EBR-II), which was sodium-cooled, and included a fuel recycling facility. EBR-II was later modified to test other reactor designs, including a fast-neutron reactor and, in 1982, the Integral Fast Reactor concept—a revolutionary design that reprocessed its own fuel, reduced its atomic waste and withstood safety tests of the same failures that triggered the Chernobyl and Three Mile Island disasters. In 1994, however, the U.S. Congress terminated funding for the bulk of Argonne's nuclear programs.

Argonne moved to specialize in other areas, while capitalizing on its experience in physics, chemical sciences and metallurgy. In 1987, the laboratory was the first to successfully demonstrate a pioneering technique called plasma wakefield acceleration, which accelerates particles in much shorter distances than conventional accelerators. It also cultivated a strong battery research program.

Following a major push by then-director Alan Schriesheim, the laboratory was chosen as the site of the Advanced Photon Source, a major X-ray facility which was completed in 1995 and produced the brightest X-rays in the world at the time of its construction.

A Department of Energy video about the IVN-Tandem at the Argonne National Laboratory

=== Since 1995 ===
The laboratory continued to develop as a center for energy research, as well as a site for scientific facilities too large to be hosted at universities.

In the early 2000s, the Argonne Leadership Computing Facility (ALCF) was founded and hosted multiple supercomputers, several of which ranked among the top 10 most powerful in the world at the time of their construction. The laboratory also built the Center for Nanoscale Materials for conducting materials research at the atomic level; and greatly expanded its battery research and quantum technology programs.

Chicago Tribune reported in March 2019 that the laboratory was constructing the world's most powerful supercomputer. Costing $500 million, it will have the processing power of 1 quintillion FLOPS. Applications will include the analysis of stars and improvements in the power grid.

== Initiatives ==
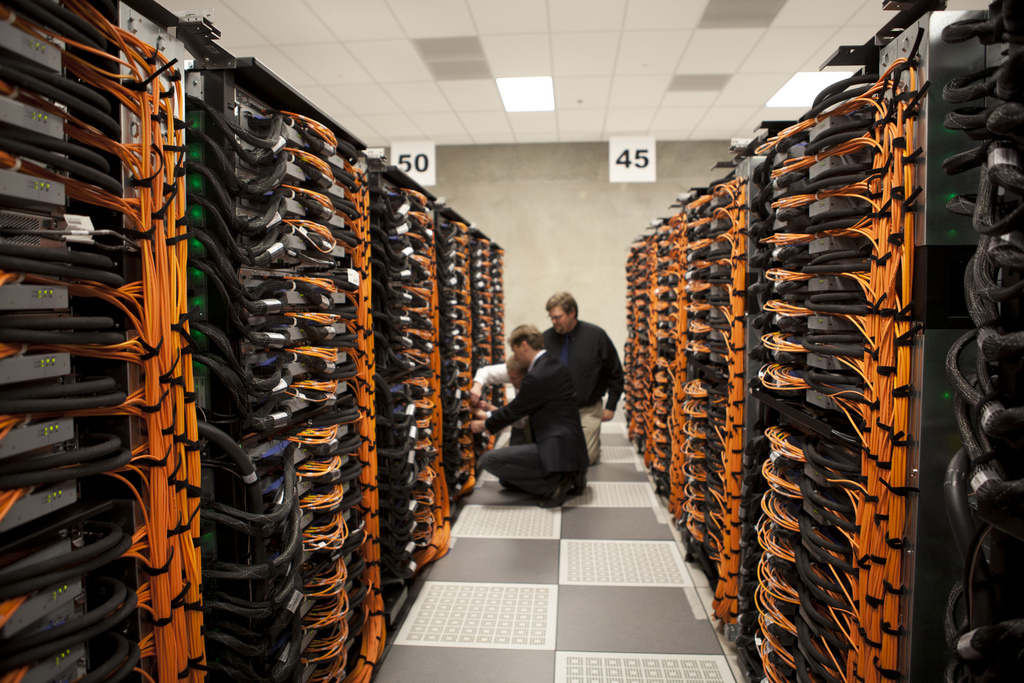
Argonne's IBM Blue Gene/Q supercomputer

- Hard X-ray Sciences: Argonne is home to one of the world's largest high-energy light sources: the Advanced Photon Source (APS). Each year, scientists make thousands of discoveries while using the APS to characterize both organic and inorganic materials and even processes, such as how vehicle fuel injectors spray gasoline in engines.
- Leadership Computing: Argonne maintains its Argonne Leadership Computing Facility (ALCF) for one of the fastest computers for open science and has developed system software for these massive machines. Argonne works to drive the evolution of leadership computing from petascale to exascale, develop new codes and computing environments, and expand computational efforts to help solve scientific challenges. For example, in October 2009, the laboratory announced that it would be embarking on a joint project to explore cloud computing for scientific purposes. In the 1970s Argonne translated the Numerische Mathematik numerical linear algebra programs from ALGOL to Fortran and this library was expanded into LINPACK and EISPACK, by Cleve Moler, et al.
- Materials for Energy: Argonne scientists work to predict, understand, and control where and how to place individual atoms and molecules to achieve desired material properties. Among other innovations, Argonne scientists helped develop an ice slurry to cool the organs of heart attack victims, described what makes diamonds slippery at the nanoscale level, and discovered a superinsulating material that resists the flow of electric current more completely than any other previous material.
- Electrochemical Energy Storage: Argonne develops batteries for electric transportation technology and grid storage for intermittent energy sources like wind or solar, as well as the manufacturing processes needed for these materials-intensive systems. The laboratory has been working on advanced battery materials research and development for over 50 years. In the past 10 years, the laboratory has focused on lithium-ion batteries, and in September 2009, it announced an initiative to explore and improve their capabilities. Argonne also maintains an independent battery-testing facility, which tests sample batteries from both government and private industry to see how well they perform over time and under heat and cold stresses.
- Alternative Energy and Efficiency: Argonne develops both chemical and biological fuels tailored for current engines as well as improved combustion schemes for future engine technologies. The laboratory has also recommended best practices for conserving fuel; for example, a study that recommended installing auxiliary cab heaters for trucks in lieu of idling the engine. Meanwhile, the solar energy research program focuses on solar-fuel and solar-electric devices and systems that are scalable and economically competitive with fossil energy sources. Argonne scientists also explore best practices for a smart grid, both by modeling power flow between utilities and homes and by researching the technology for interfaces.
- Nuclear Energy: Argonne generates advanced reactor and fuel cycle technologies that enable the safe, sustainable generation of nuclear power. Argonne scientists develop and validate computational models and reactor simulations of future generation nuclear reactors. Another project studies how to reprocess spent nuclear fuel, so that waste is reduced up to 90%.
- Biological and Environmental Systems: Understanding the local effect of climate change requires integration of the interactions between the environment and human activities. Argonne scientists study these relationships from molecule to organism to ecosystem. Programs include bioremediation using trees to pull pollutants out of groundwater; biochips to detect cancers earlier; a project to target cancerous cells using nanoparticles; soil metagenomics; and a user facility for the Atmospheric Radiation Measurementclimate change research project.
- National Security: Argonne develops security technologies that will prevent and mitigate events with potential for mass disruption or destruction. These include sensors that can detect chemical, biological, nuclear and explosive materials; portable Terahertz radiation ("T-ray") machines that detect dangerous materials more easily than X-rays at airports; and tracking and modeling the possible paths of chemicals released into a subway.

== User facilities ==
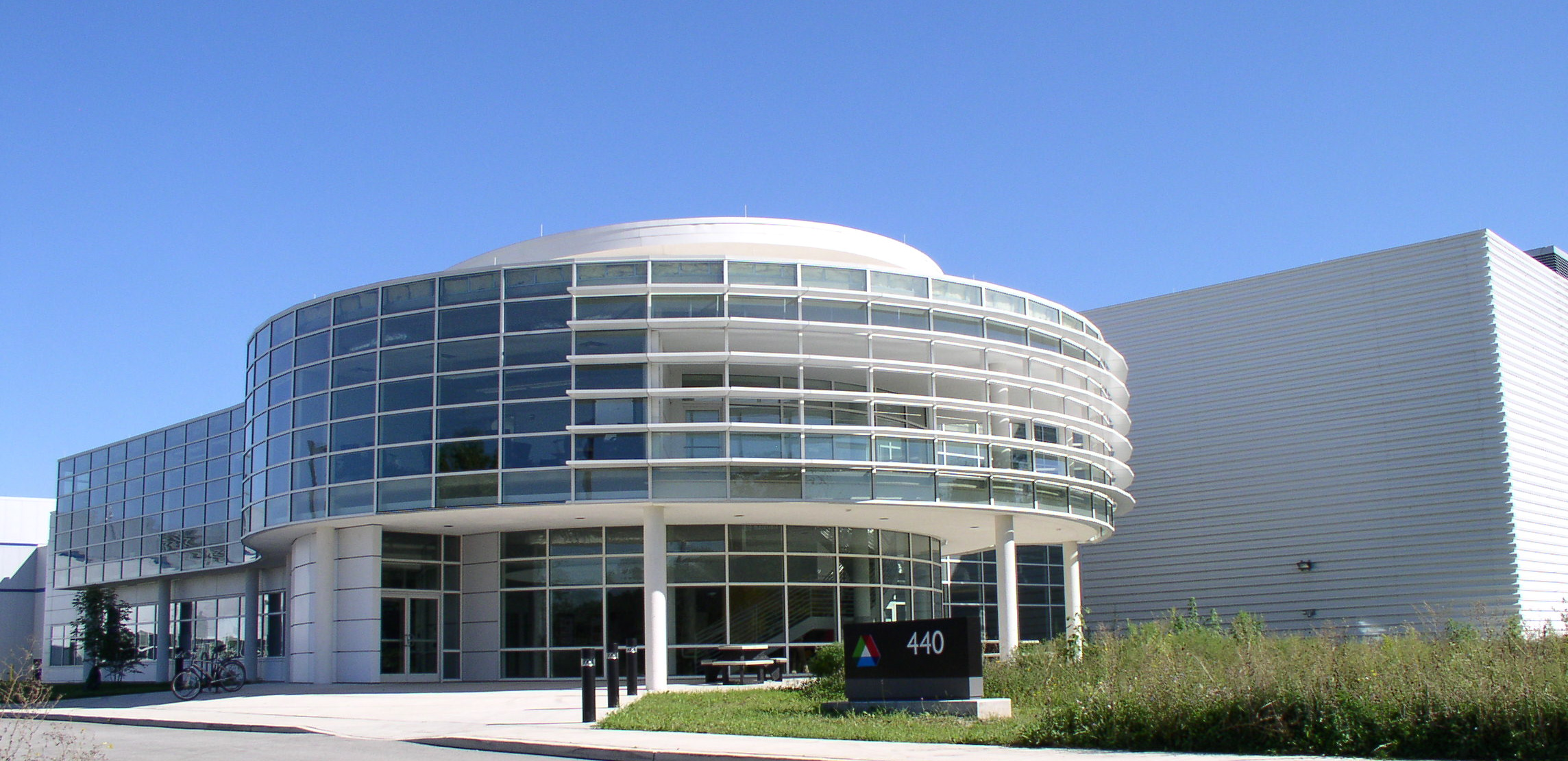
Argonne's Center for Nanoscale Materials

Argonne builds and maintains scientific facilities that would be too expensive for a single company or university to construct and operate. These facilities are used by scientists from Argonne, private industry, academia, other national laboratories and international scientific organizations.

- Advanced Photon Source (APS): a national synchrotron X-ray research facility which produces the brightest X-ray beams in the Western Hemisphere.
- Center for Nanoscale Materials (CNM): a user facility located on the APS which provides infrastructure and instruments to study nanotechnology and nanomaterials. The CNM is one of five U.S. Department of Energy Office of Science Nanoscale Science Research Centers.
- Argonne Tandem Linac Accelerator System (ATLAS): ATLAS is the world's first superconducting particle accelerator for heavy ions at energies in the vicinity of the Coulomb barrier. This is the energy domain suited to study the properties of the nucleus, the core of matter and the fuel of stars.

== Centers ==
- The Advanced Materials for Energy-Water Systems (AMEWS) Center is an Energy Frontier Research Center sponsored by the U.S. Department of Energy. Led by Argonne National Laboratory and including the University of Chicago and Northwestern University as partners, AMEWS works to solve the challenges that exist at the interface of water and the materials that make up the systems that handle, process and treat water.
- Electron Microscopy Center (EMC): one of three DOE-supported scientific user facilities for electron beam microcharacterization. The EMC conducts in situ studies of transformations and defect processes, ion beam modification and irradiation effects, superconductors, ferroelectrics and interfaces. Its intermediate voltage electron microscope, which is coupled with an accelerator, represents the only such system in the United States.
- Biology Center (SBC): The SBC is a user facility located off the Advanced Photon Source X-ray facility, which specializes in macromolecular crystallography. Users have access to an insertion-device, a bending-magnet, and a biochemistry laboratory. SBC beamlines are often used to map out the crystal structures of proteins; in the past, users have imaged proteins from anthrax, meningitis-causing bacteria, salmonella, and other pathogenic bacteria.
- The Network Enabled Optimization System (NEOS) Server is the first network-enabled problem-solving environment for a wide class of applications in business, science, and engineering. Included are state-of-the-art solvers in integer programming, nonlinear optimization, linear programming, stochastic programming, and complementarity problems. Most NEOS solvers accept input in the AMPL modeling language.
- The Joint Center for Energy Storage Research (JCESR) is a consortium of several national laboratories, academic institutions, and industrial partners based at Argonne National Laboratory. The mission of JCESR is to design and build transformative materials enabling next-generation batteries that satisfy all the performance metrics for a given application.
- The Midwest Integrated Center for Computational Materials (MICCoM) is headquartered at the laboratory. MICCoM develops and disseminates interoperable open-source software, data, and validation procedures to simulate and predict properties of functional materials for energy conversion processes.
- The ReCell Center is a national collaboration of industry, academia and national laboratories, led by Argonne National Laboratory, working to advance recycling technologies along the entire battery life cycle. The center aims to grow a sustainable advanced battery recycling industry by developing economic and environmentally sound recycling processes that can be adopted by industry for lithium-ion and future battery chemistries.

== Educational and community outreach ==
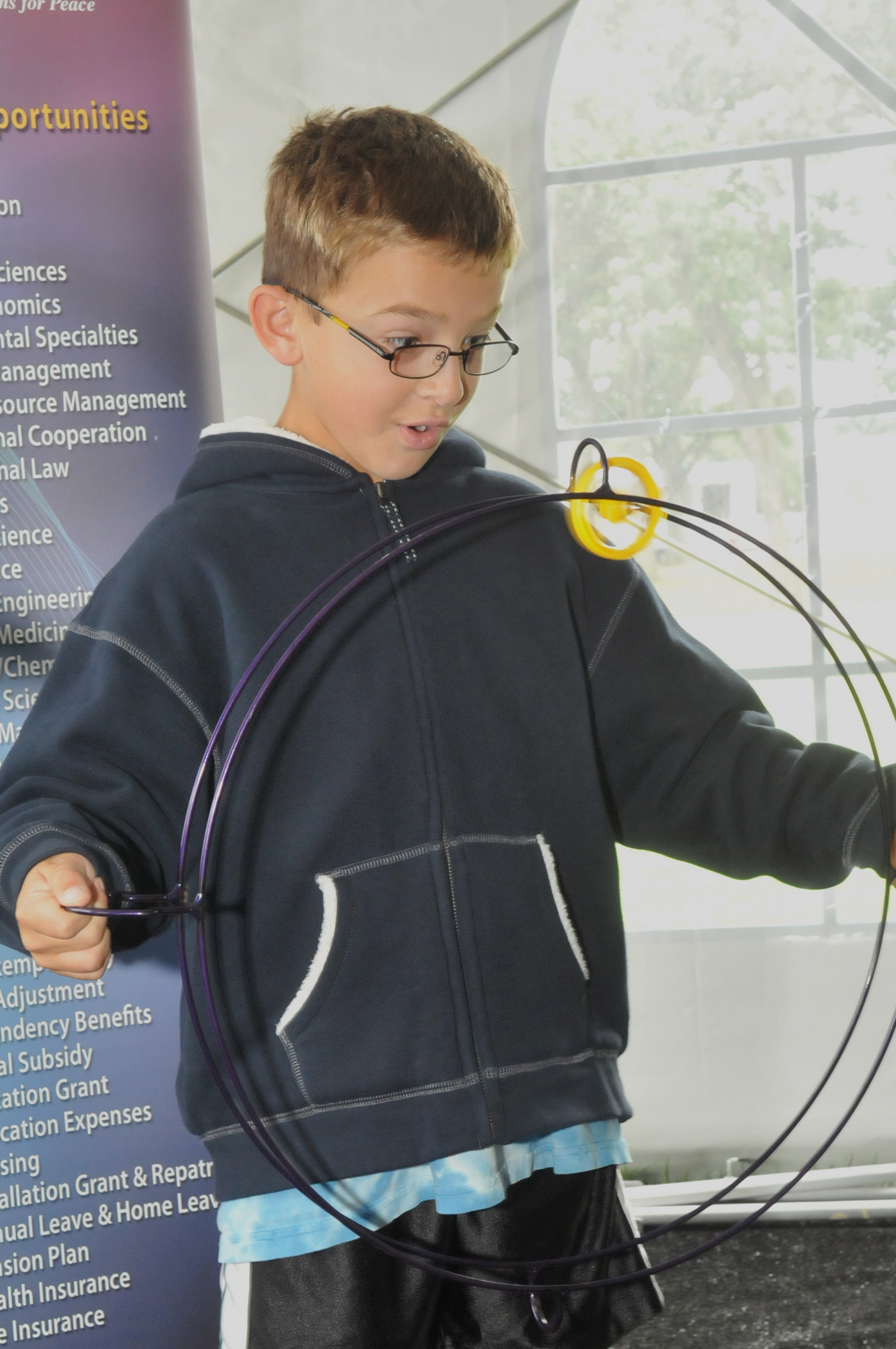
A student examines Argonne's Gyro Wheel at the Open House.

Argonne welcomes all members of the public age 16 or older to take guided tours of the scientific and engineering facilities and grounds. For children under 16, Argonne offers hands-on learning activities suitable for K–12 field trips. The laboratory also hosts educational science and engineering outreach for schools in the surrounding area.

Argonne scientists and engineers take part in the training of nearly 1,000 college graduate students and post-doctoral researchers every year as part of their research and development activities.

== Directors ==
Over the course of its history, 13 individuals have served as Argonne Director:

(Please note that the University of Chicago had erroneously reported in November 2017 that Paul Kearns would be serving as the "14th director of Argonne".)

| No. | Image | Director | Term start | Term end | Refs. |
|---|---|---|---|---|---|
| 1 | | Walter Zinn | 1946 | 1956 | |
| 2 | | Norman Hilberry | 1957 | 1961 | |
| 3 | | Albert V. Crewe | 1961 | 1967 | |
| 4 | | Robert B. Duffield | 1967 | 1973 | |
| 5 | | Robert G. Sachs | 1973 | 1979 | |
| 6 | | Walter E. Massey | 1979 | May 9, 1984 | |
| 7 | | Alan Schriesheim | May 10, 1984 | June 30, 1996 | |
| 8 | | Dean E. Eastman | July 1, 1996 | June 30, 1998 | |
| interim | | Frank Y. Fradin | July 1, 1998 | June 30, 1999 | |
| interim | | Yoon Il Chang | July 1, 1999 | October 31, 2000 | |
| 9 | | Hermann A. Grunder | November 1, 2000 | April 17, 2005 | |
| 10 | | Robert Rosner | April 18, 2005 | April 30, 2008 | |
| 11 | | Eric Isaacs | May 1, 2009 | March 31, 2014 | |
| 12 | | Peter Littlewood | April 30, 2014 | December 31, 2016 | |
| interim | | Paul Kearns | January 1, 2017 | November 17, 2017 | |
| 13 | | Paul Kearns | November 17, 2017 | present | |

== In media ==
Significant portions of the 1996 chase film Chain Reaction were shot in the Zero Gradient Synchrotron ring room and the former Continuous Wave Deuterium Demonstrator laboratory.

== Notable staff ==
- Alexei Alexeyevich Abrikosov
- Khalil Amine
- Paul Benioff
- Charles H. Bennett
- Sandra Biedron
- Margaret K. Butler
- John M. Carpenter
- Yanglai Cho
- George Crabtree
- Seth Darling
- Harold B. Evans
- Paul Fenter
- Enrico Fermi
- Stuart Freedman
- Ian Foster
- Wallace Givens
- Raymond Goertz
- Maury C. Goodman
- Kawtar Hafidi
- Morton Hamermesh
- Cynthia Hall
- Katrin Heitmann
- Caroline Herzenberg
- Nancy Collins Johnson
- Paul Kearns
- Harold Lichtenberger
- Maria Goeppert Mayer
- William McCune
- Joël Mesot
- Carlo Montemagno
- José Enrique Moyal
- Gilbert Jerome Perlow
- Stephen Turnham Pratt
- Lloyd Quarterman
- Aneesur Rahman
- Luise Meyer-Schützmeister
- Rolf Siemssen
- Dorothy Martin Simon
- Lynda Soderholm
- Marius Stan
- Rick Stevens
- Valerie Taylor
- Marion C. Thurnauer
- Carlos E.M. Wagner
- Kameshwar C. Wali
- Larry Wos
- Cosmas Zachos
- Daniel Zajfman
- Nestor J. Zaluzec

== See also ==
- Advanced Research Projects Agency-Energy
- Automated theorem proving
- Canadian Penning Trap Spectrometer
- Center for the Advancement of Science in Space—operates the US National Laboratory on the ISS.
- Gammasphere
- Nanofluid
- Track Imaging Cherenkov Experiment
