= Center for Nanoscale Materials =

US research center

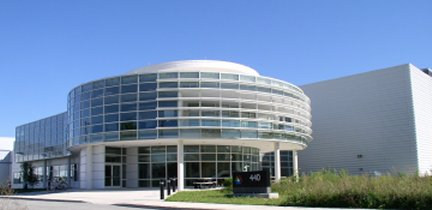
- Center for Nanoscale Materials building at Argonne National Laboratory
- Field of research: nanoscience and nanotechnology research
- Location: 9700 South Cass Avenue, Building 440, Lemont, Illinois
- Website: http://nano.anl.gov

The Center for Nanoscale Materials is one of five Nanoscale Science Research Centers the United States Department of Energy sponsors. The Center is at the Argonne National Laboratory location in Lemont, Illinois.

The Center for Nanoscale Materials at Argonne National Laboratory is part of the U.S. Department of Energy (DOE) Office of Basic Energy Science Nanoscale Science Research Center program. The CNM serves as a user-based center, providing tools and infrastructure for nanoscience and nanotechnology research. The CNM's stated mission includes supporting basic research and the development of advanced instrumentation that helps generate new scientific insights and the creation of new materials with novel properties.

== See also ==
- X-ray nanoprobe
