= Zero Gradient Synchrotron =

Particle accelerator

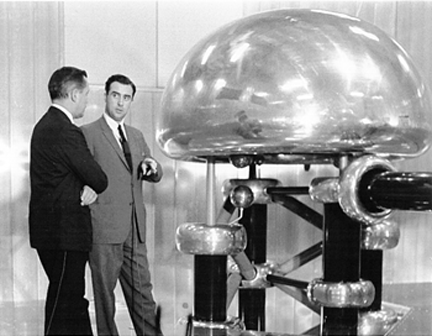

The Zero Gradient Synchrotron (ZGS), was a weak focusing 12.5 GeV proton accelerator that operated at the Argonne National Laboratory in Illinois from 1964 to 1979.

It enabled pioneering experiments in particle physics, in the areas of

- quark model tests;
- neutrino physics (observation of neutrino interaction in its 12 ft hydrogen bubble chamber for the first time in 1970);
- spin physics of hadrons (utilizing a polarized accelerated proton beam in the GeV range for the first time); and
- Kaon decays.

Other noteworthy features of the ZGS program were the large number of university-based users and the pioneering development of large superconducting magnets for bubble chambers and beam transport.

The hardware and building of the ZGS were ultimately inherited by a spallation neutron source program, the Intense Pulsed Neutron Source (IPNS).

== In media ==
Significant portions of the 1996 chase film Chain Reaction were shot in the Zero Gradient Synchrotron ring room and the former Continuous Wave Deuterium Demonstrator laboratory.
