= Advanced Photon Source =

Coordinates: 41°42′13″N 87°59′17″W

Advanced Photon Source (APS)
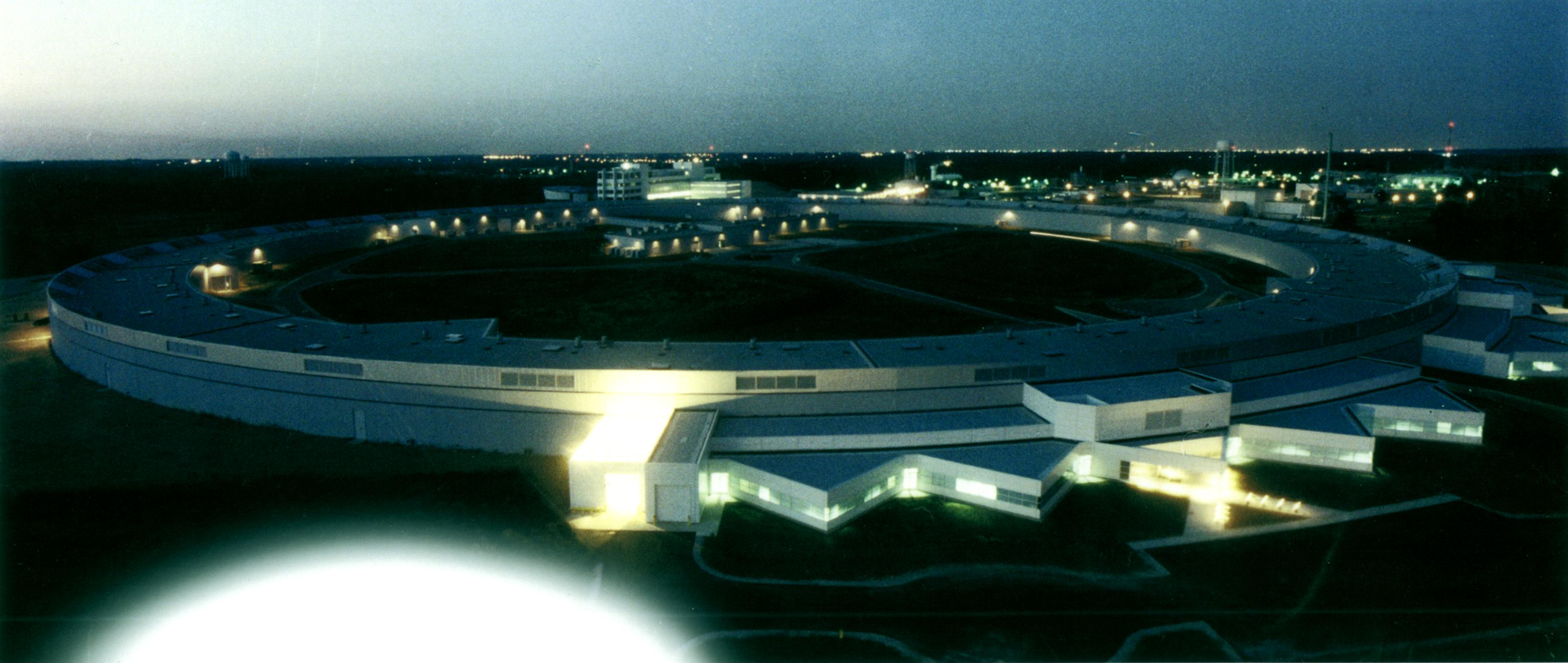
- External view of the APS

General properties
- Accelerator type: Storage ring
- Beam type: Electron
- Target type: Light source

Beam properties
- Maximum energy: 7 GeV
- Maximum current: 100 mA
- Maximum brightness: 6×10^{19} ph./s/0.1%/mm^{2}/mrad^{2}

Physical properties
- Circumference: 1,100 metres (3,600 ft)
- Location: Lemont, Illinois
- Institution: US-DoE
- Dates of operation: 1995 – present

The Advanced Photon Source (APS) at Argonne National Laboratory (in Lemont, Illinois) is a storage-ring-based high-energy X-ray light source facility. It is one of five X-ray light sources owned and funded by the U.S. Department of Energy Office of Science. The APS began operation on March 26, 1995. It is operated as a user facility, meaning that it is open to the world’s scientific community, and more than 5,500 researchers make use of its resources each year.

== How APS works ==
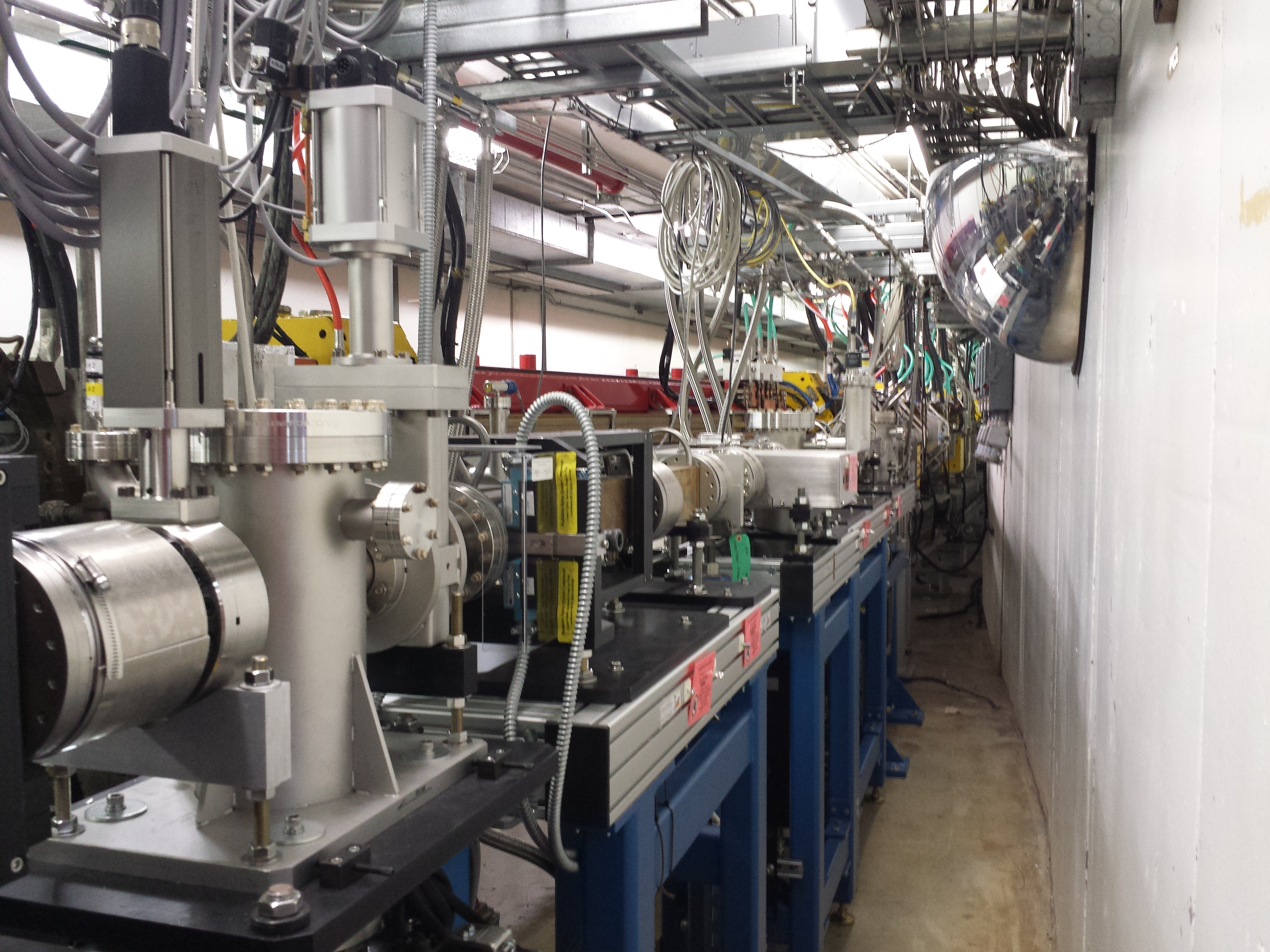
Inside the APS Storage Ring Enclosure

The APS uses a series of particle accelerators to push electrons up to nearly the speed of light, and then injects them into a storage ring that is roughly two-thirds of a mile around. At every bend in the track, these electrons emit synchrotron radiation in the form of ultrabright X-rays. Scientists at 65 experiment stations around the ring use these X-rays for basic and applied research in a number of fields.

The Experiment Hall surrounds the storage ring and is divided into 35 sectors, each of which has access to x-ray beamlines, one at an insertion device, and the other at a bending magnet. Each sector also corresponds to a lab/office module offering immediate access to the beamline. Due to this, the different beamlines are used in various disciplines and different techniques are employed. The disciplines are typically one or more of the following: Material Science, Physics, Chemistry, Life Science, Geoscience, Environmental Science, Catalysis, and Polymer Science.

== APS uses ==
Scientists use X-rays generated by the APS to peer inside batteries, with the goal of creating longer-lasting, faster-charging energy storage devices; to improve 3D printing for more durable materials; to learn more about the behavior of charged particles in order to improve electronics; and to map the brain to understand more about neurological diseases. APS research played a role in the development of the COVID-19 vaccines in use in the United States.

Three Nobel prizes in Chemistry have been granted for work performed in part at the APS.

- The 2009 prize was awarded for the discovery of the structure and function of the ribosome. The X-rays generated by the APS allowed for solving the structure of the smaller units that make up ribosomes.
- The 2012 prize was awarded for the structure of G protein-coupled receptors. The X-rays generated by the APS allowed high-resolution structure determination of the GPCRs.
- The 2024 prize was awarded in part for computationally designing new proteins. The APS was used to verify the structures of the artificially designed proteins.

== APS upgrade ==
The APS underwent an upgrade that saw the original storage ring replaced with a new multi-bend achromat lattice. Construction of nine new feature beamlines and 15 enhanced existing beamlines was completed in 2024 and 2025. The result will be X-rays that are up to 500 times brighter than those currently generated, and beamlines that will enable greater focusing ability to examine smaller materials in sharper detail. The installation period for the new storage ring began on April 24, 2023, and was completed roughly 12 months later in 2024, with stored beam demonstrated April 20, 2024. The APS's upgraded electron beam is significantly more accurate going from a 10 microns vertically to 4 and 275 microns horizontally to 15. The APS upgrade was officially completed in early 2026.

== See also ==
- Keith Moffat
- EPICS
