= A Totally Hermetic Electron-Nucleus Apparatus =

ATHENA detector at the future Electron-Ion Collider

A Totally Hermetic Electron-Nucleus Apparatus (ATHENA) is a proposed experiment at the future Electron Ion Collider (EIC), in Brookhaven National Laboratory, United States.

The ATHENA detector design is inspired in the EIC Yellow report. detector concept based on a brand new, large bore, superconducting, solenoid magnet with a field strength up to 3 Tesla.

== Mission, collaboration and spokesperson ==
The ATHENA experiment aims at fulfilling the physics goals established in the EIC White Paper, National Academies of Sciences report and Yellow Report.

The ATHENA collaboration currently consists of 94 institutions from 14 countries. The initial organizing committee includes the following members: Silvia Dalla Torre (INFN Trieste, Italy), Abhay Deshpande (Stony Brook University / CFNS & BNL, USA), Olga Evdokimov (University of Illinois / Chicago, USA), Yulia Furletova (JLab, USA), Barbara Jacak (UC Berkeley, USA), Alexander, Kiselev (BNL, USA), Franck Sabatie (Saclay, France), and Bernd Surrow (Temple University, USA).

The ATHENA collaboration was formally established in 2021; Silvia Dalla Torre was elected spokesperson, and Bernd Surrow was elected deputy spokesperson. The ATHENA proposal was submitted in December 2021, and is one of the three designs competing for funding.

== Detector technologies ==
The ATHENA detector will be highly asymmetric to properly fit the angle and energy distribution of particles produced in collisions of beams of electrons and hadrons, which will have different energies.

The measurement of charged-particles in the ATHENA design relies on multiple low-mass, high resolution technologies: for small radius the technology of choice is monolithic active pixel sensors (MAPS), which are under active development. At larger radius, gaseous detectors are used. Micro-pattern gaseous detectors are being developed at CEA-Saclay and other institutes.

The ATHENA calorimeter system is composed of electromagnetic and hadronic sections which cover the full azimuth angle and polar angle covering up to 2 degrees. The electromagnetic section is composed of a crystal calorimeter in the negative direction, a novel imaging calorimeter in the central region, and a sampling calorimeter in the forward direction. The hadronic calorimeter system is composed of high-granularity sampling calorimeters with low threshold and good timing capabilities.

The ATHENA far backward detectors, which will enable polarimetry measurement of electrons scattered at very low angles, are being designed by a consortium of UK institutions.

The ATHENA high granularity capabilities provide great potential for the use of Artificial intelligence algorithms, which is an active area of research. Notable examples include the exploitation of the imaging electromagnetic calorimeter for electron tagging down to extremely low momentum; imaging with the longitudinally segmented hadronic calorimeter for software energy compensation; and regression for the event kinematics in deep-inelastic scattering

== Logo and name ==
The ATHENA logo was selected in a competition. The design is by Sean Preins (University of California, Riverside). The logo includes references to the Athena goddess such as: the spear, the olive branches, the owl eye (encoded as a transverse view of the detector). The logo also makes reference to the process of neutral-current deep inelastic scattering, which typically produces a signature of an electron recoiling against a hadronic jet; the jet is depicted as four trajectories which are bent by the solenoid magnet. The logo also references the position of the interaction region that will host ATHENA (located at 6 o'clock), and the beam polarization capabilities of the EIC (spinning spear). It contains the word "EIC", which is a feature inspired in the EIC user group logo.

ATHENA is an acronym for "A Totally Hermetic Electron-Nucleus Apparatus", which was elected in a competition. The name was coined by Miguel Arratia (University of California, Riverside). The name encapsulates its key feature, which is being a hermetic detector. The name is also a tribute to the previous generation of experiments (ZEUS and H1) that operated in the HERA collider at DESY at Hamburg until 2007. In Greek mythology, Athena is the daughter of Zeus and Hera, and the favorite child of Zeus. The name also is a reference fact that Athena is the goddess for craft, wisdom, and strategic war, which is apt for an experimental collaboration.

== Promotional video ==
The video shown here illustrates event displays produced with simulated data using the ATHENA model.
