= Halina Abramowicz =

Polish and Israeli physicist

Halina Abramowicz (הלינה אברמוביץ) is a Polish and Israeli experimental particle physicist. She is a professor emerita in the School of Physics and Astronomy at Tel Aviv University in Israel.

== Education and career ==
Abramowicz was a physics student at the University of Warsaw in Poland, where she received a master's degree in 1974, a Ph.D. in 1978, and a habilitation in 1988.

She remained at the University of Warsaw as an assistant professor from 1979 to 1993, receiving tenure but remaining at the assistant level in 1988 with her habilitation. In 1993 she moved to Israel and the School of Physics and Astronomy of Tel Aviv University, as a tenure-track associate professor. She received tenure there in 1996 and was promoted to full professor in 1998. She was given the Nathan Cummings Endowed Chair of Experimental Particle Physics at Tel Aviv University in 2003.

In 2008, she added an affiliation as external scientific member of the Max Planck Institute for Physics near Munich, Germany.

== Research ==
In Poland in the 1970s, women were not uncommon in physics; however, she was encouraged to go into experimental rather than theoretical physics, in order to give priority to men in theory. Her master's degree research involved the study of strong interactions through pion decay using a bubble chamber at CERN, and she continued this line of research in her doctoral studies on pion–deuterium collisions using another bubble chamber at Fermilab.

Following her doctorate, she moved to studies involving neutrino beams with the CDHS experiment, using scintillators instead of bubble chambers. Her accomplishments in this period included calculations of radiative corrections to the predicted cross sections of these experiments, and the measurement of the Weinberg angle, including the correction of a sign error in the contribution to this angle from the charm quark mass. With Roman Walczak of University of Warsaw, she also worked on a detector component that later became the backing calorimeter of the ZEUS particle detector at DESY in Hamburg, Germany.

After moving from Warsaw to Tel Aviv, she shifted her work from detector design to data analysis, especially focusing on what later became identified as a large rapidity gap to identify colorless diffraction events. In the early 2010s, she chaired the European Committee for Future Accelerators. Beginning in 2019, her research returned to detector design, with improvements to calorimetry in the proposed LUXE experiment at DESY in collaboration with Beate Heinemann.

== Recognition ==
Abramowicz was elected as a Fellow of the European Physical Society in 2013, as a foreign member of the Polish Academy of Arts and Sciences in 2015, and as a member of Academia Europaea in 2019. In 2021, she was the recipient the Beate Naroska Senior Guest Professorship award from the University of Hamburg and DESY.
