= Elke-Caroline Aschenauer =

American physicist

- Education: University of Erlangen–Nuremberg; Swiss Federal Institute of Technology
- Awards: Humboldt Research Award (2018)
- Scientific career
- Fields: Nuclear physics, experimental physics, quantum Chromodynamics (QCD)
- Workplaces: Brookhaven National Laboratory; Jefferson Lab

Elke-Caroline Aschenauer is a senior physicist at the U.S. Department of Energy Brookhaven National Laboratory, where she has worked since 2009. She is a fellow of the American Physical Society and received a Humboldt Research Award in 2018.

== Education and career ==
Aschenauer's undergraduate studies were at the University of Erlangen–Nuremberg from 1984 to 1989. In 1990, she went to the Swiss Federal Institute of Technology for a PhD, where she graduated with in 1994. Afterwards, she took a postdoctoral fellowship at the Ghent University and Nikhef.

In 1997, Aschenauer joined DESY to work on the HERMES experiment, eventually becoming the spokesperson for HERMES before her departure in 2006. Next, she worked at Jefferson Lab, where she was a group leader. In 2009, she moved to Brookhaven Lab, where she works today.

== Awards ==
In 2012, Aschenauer was named a fellow of APS "[f]or her scientific and technical accomplishments in the study of the spin structure of the nucleon, and her demonstrated ability to lead large, international collaborations in design and execution of such experiments." Later, in 2018, she was awarded a Humboldt Research Award for her contributions to particle physics.

== Selected publications ==
- "(Li-6, He-6) reaction and Gamow-Teller beta decay" M. Moosburger (Erlangen - Nuremberg U.), Elke-Caroline Aschenauer (Erlangen - Nuremberg U.), H. Dennert (Erlangen - Nuremberg U.), W. Eyrich (Erlangen - Nuremberg U.), A. Lehmann (Erlangen - Nuremberg U.) et al. DOI: 10.1103/PhysRevC.41.2925. Published in: Phys.Rev.C 41 (1990), 2925–2928
- "The HERMES dual-radiator ring imaging Cherenkov detector" N Akopov (Yerevan Phys. Inst.), E.C Aschenauer (DESY, Zeuthen), K Bailey (Argonne, PHY), S Bernreuther (Tokyo Inst. Tech.), N Bianchi (Frascati) et al. DOI: 10.1016/S0168-9002(01)00932-9. Published in: Nucl.Instrum.Meth.A 479 (2002), 511–530
- "Precise determination of the spin structure function g(1) of the proton, deuteron and neutron" HERMES Collaboration • A. Airapetian (Michigan U.) et al. DOI: 10.1103/PhysRevD.75.012007. Published in: Phys.Rev.D 75 (2007), 012007
- "Electron Ion Collider: The Next QCD Frontier: Understanding the glue that binds us all" A. Accardi (Jefferson Lab and Hampton U.), J.L. Albacete (Orsay, IPN), M. Anselmino (INFN, Turin and Turin U.), N. Armesto (Santiago de Compostela U.), E.C. Aschenauer (Brookhaven) et al. DOI: 10.1140/epja/i2016-16268-9. Published in: Eur.Phys.J.A 52 (2016) 9, 268
- "The electron–ion collider: assessing the energy dependence of key measurements" E.C. Aschenauer (Brookhaven), S. Fazio (Brookhaven), J.H. Lee (Brookhaven), H. Mantysaari (Brookhaven), B.S. Page (Brookhaven) et al. DOI: 10.1088/1361-6633/aaf216. Published in: Rept.Prog.Phys. 82 (2019) 2, 024301
