= DESY (particle accelerator) =

Coordinates: 53°34′33″N 9°52′46″E

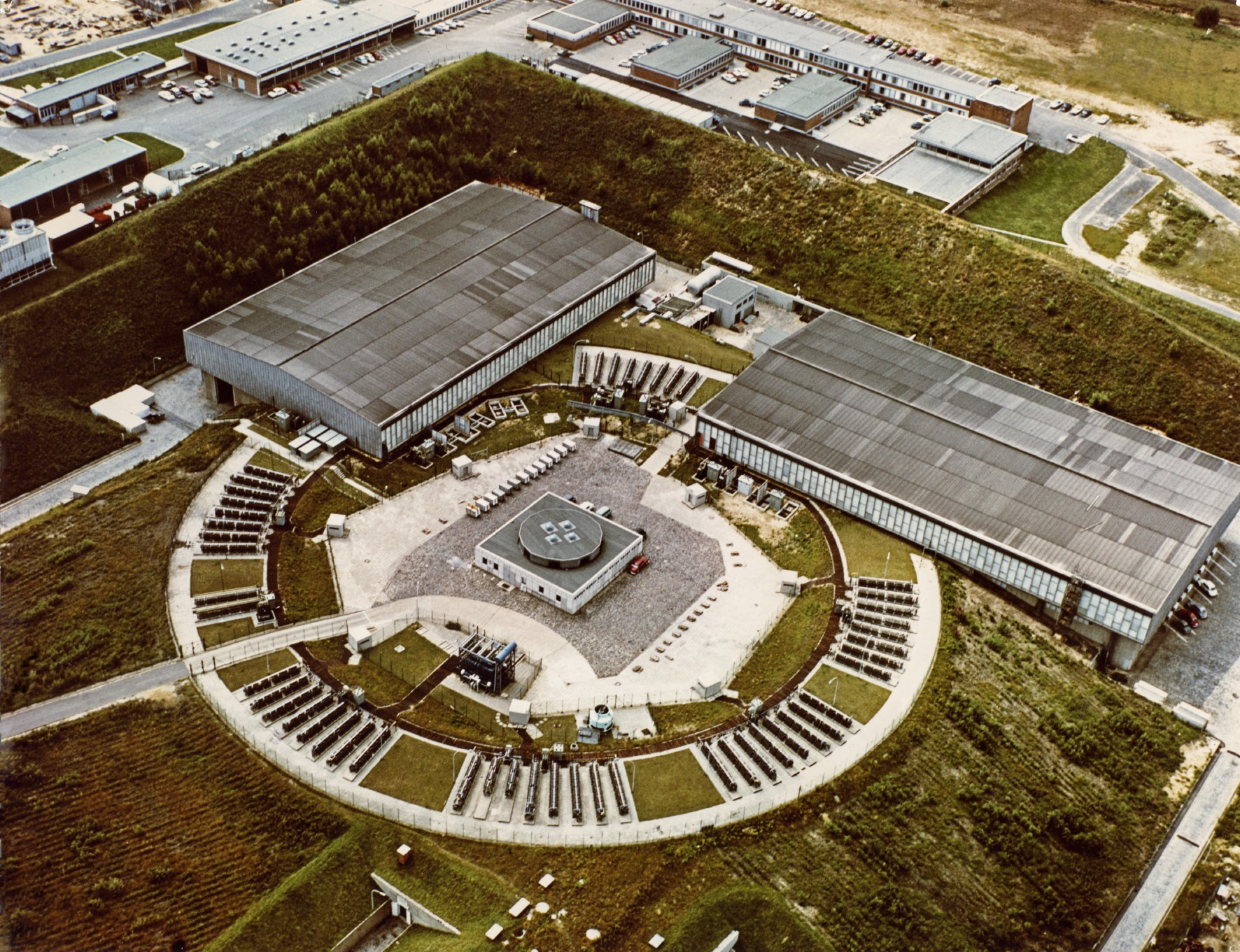
DESY’s first particle accelerator (called DESY) in 1965

The particle accelerator DESY (acronym for Deutsches Elektronen-Synchrotron or German Electron Synchrotron) was the first particle accelerator of the DESY research centre in Hamburg and the one that gave the research centre its name. The DESY synchrotron was used for research in particle physics from 1964 to 1978 and served as a pre-accelerator for other accelerator facilities at DESY.

Construction of the synchrotron started in 1960. With a circumference of 300 m, it was the world's largest facility of its kind and accelerated electrons to 7.4 GeV. The first electrons circulated in acceleration on 25 February 1964, and research activities into elementary particles at the DESY synchrotron started in May 1964. In the experiments carried out at DESY, the electron beams were directed at fixed targets.

== Research at the DESY particle accelerator ==
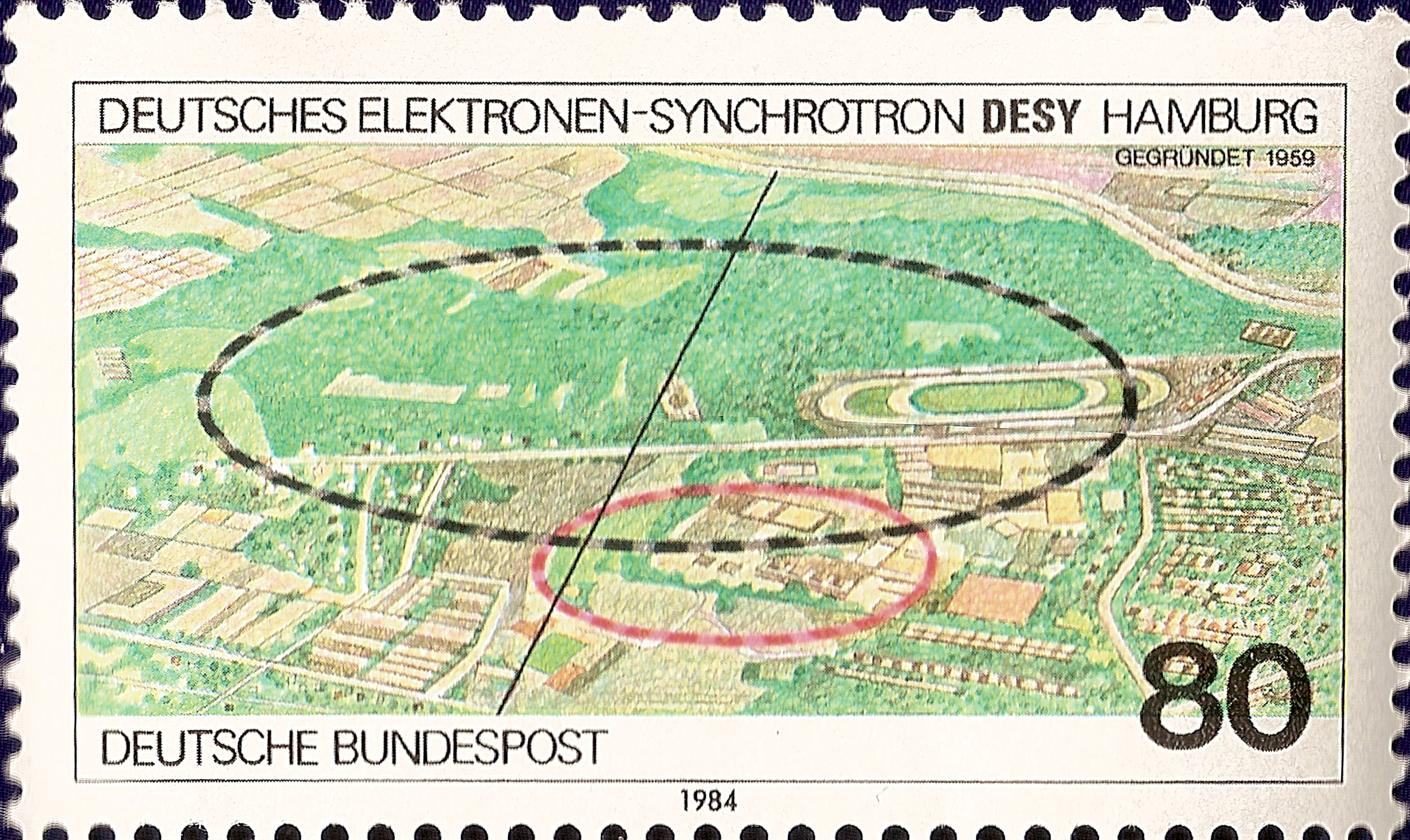
German 1984 postal stamp - 25th anniversary of DESY's foundation

DESY first attracted international attention in 1966 with its confirmation of the theory of quantum electrodynamics. A world-first, production of proton–antiproton pairs using high-energy radiation, was also achieved at the DESY accelerator in 1966. Additionally, protons were very accurately scanned, showing that they do not have a solid nucleus. In the following decade, DESY established itself as a skills centre for developing and operating particle accelerator facilities.

Before 1964 no continuous soft-x-ray radiation sources existed. In that year, research began using the synchrotron radiation that occurs as a side effect of electron acceleration in the DESY ring. Synchrotron radiation was first used for absorption spectroscopy at the synchrotron in 1967. The European Molecular Biology Laboratory (EMBL) made use of this new technology's potential and 1972 established a permanent branch at DESY with the aim of analyzing the structure of biological molecules through synchrotron radiation.

== Pre-accelerator and test beam facility ==
The particle physics experiments at the original DESY synchrotron ran until 1978. After that, it was rebuilt and upgraded several times, serving as a pre-accelerator for DESY's larger accelerator facilities starting in 1973 for the storage ring DORIS, and from 1978 mainly for PETRA. After a fundamental modification to become the proton synchrotron DESY III, the facility went back into operation in 1987 together with the newly built electron synchrotron DESY II as a pre-accelerator for HERA. With the shutdown of HERA in 2007, the proton synchrotron DESY III was also decommissioned after 43 years of operation.

Today, the DESY II electron synchrotron still serves as a pre-accelerator for PETRA III and as a test beam facility with three beamlines used by research groups worldwide to test detector components.
