= HERMES experiment =

HERMES was a particle detector at the HERA particle accelerator located at the German national laboratory DESY in Hamburg. The experiment's goal was to investigate the quark–gluon structure of matter by examining how a nucleon's constituents affect its spin. It later developed into a pioneering experiment for measuring generalised parton parton distributions and a general-purpose experiment for the study of QCD processes. HERMES completed its first run between 1995 and 2000, and its second run between 2001 and 2007. It measured 3.5 m × 8 m × 5 m and weighed 400 tons.

The HERMES collaboration consisted of nearly 200 scientists from more than 13 countries.

== Method ==
HERA's longitudinally polarized electron beam was used to explore the spin structure of nucleons. For this purpose, the electrons were scattered at energies of 27.5 GeV at an internal gas target. This target and the detector itself were designed especially with a view to spin-polarized physics. The virtual photon emitted by the electron was also polarized and sought out quarks of spin opposite to that of the photon. The asymmetry of ejected quarks was determined to deduce the net polarization of the quarks.

== Unpolarized gas feed system ==
The unpolarized gas feed system (UGFS) was used for non-polarized "end of fill" or heavy-target running before the polarized target was removed in 2003. Afterwards, the UGFS supplied the target gasses in the new detector configuration.

== See also ==
- CLAS
- LEPS
- COMPASS
- HERA
- H1
- ZEUS
- HERA-B
