= Sinead Farrington =

British particle physicist

Sinéad M Farrington
- Education: University of Glasgow; University of Edinburgh
- Awards: Laureate Blavatnik Awards for Young Scientists (2021)
- Scientific career
- Workplaces: University of Liverpool; University of Oxford; University of Warwick; CERN; University of Edinburgh
- Thesis: A measurement of the B⁰_s lifetime at CDF run II (2004)
- Doctoral advisor: Richard St.Denis

Sinéad Farrington FRSE is a British particle physicist who works on the ATLAS experiment at the Large Hadron Collider.

Farrington is interested in B physics, Higgs physics, tau physics, and long-lived particles. She is a professor of physics at the University of Edinburgh. In December 2020 Farrington was named the physical sciences and engineering laureate for the Blavatnik Awards for Young Scientists in the United Kingdom 2021.

Since July 2024, Farrington is the director of the Particle Physics Department at the Rutherford Appleton Laboratory.

== Early life and education ==
Farrington was born in Torphins, Aberdeenshire, Scotland, to John Farrington, a professor of geography at the University of Aberdeen, and Bernadette, a primary school teacher. She has one younger brother Conor. She attended St Margaret's School for Girls in Aberdeen before studying physics at the University of Edinburgh. She remained in Scotland for her doctoral research, moving to the University of Glasgow. Her research was on a measurement of the lifetime of the strange B meson as part of the Collider Detector at Fermilab (CDF) collaboration.

== Research and career ==
After completing her doctorate, Farrington joined the University of Liverpool as a research Fellow and whilst based at Fermilab co-led the CDF team that first established matter-antimatter oscillations in the B⁰_s system. Farrington went on to hold a Science and Technology Facilities Council (STFC) advanced fellowship at the University of Oxford and a junior Kurti fellowship at Brasenose College, Oxford. In 2011 she joined the department of physics at the University of Warwick where she set up her own research group on ATLAS. During this period she co-led the team on ATLAS that measured the decay of the Higgs boson to tau leptons establishing for the first time a Yukawa coupling of a scalar Higgs to fermions. She moved to the University of Edinburgh in 2018.

She has also held a CERN associateship, is a senior experimental fellow at the Institute for Particle Physics Phenomenology at Durham University and is a visiting professor at the University of Oxford. She was awarded a European Research Council consolidator grant in 2018, to develop triggers and analysis techniques to allow searches for long-lived particles decaying to tau particles at the Large Hadron Collider.

Since 2019, Farrington has been the Principal Investigator (spokesperson) for the 15 UK institutes on the ATLAS collaboration.

== Recognition ==
In 2020, Farrington was named the Blavatnik Awards for Young Scientists Faculty Winner for the United Kingdom. She was elected to the Fellowship of the Royal Society of Edinburgh in 2022.

== Selected publications ==
- ATLAS Collaboration; Aad, G.; Abbott, B.; Abdinov, O.; Abdallah, J.; Abeloos, B.; Aben, R.; Abolins, M.; Aben, R.; Abolins, M.; AbouZeid, O. S. (2016). "Test of CP invariance in vector-boson fusion production of the Higgs boson using the Optimal Observable method in the ditau decay channel with the ATLAS detector". The European Physical Journal C. 76 (12): 658. arXiv:1602.04516. Bibcode:2016EPJC...76..658A. doi:10.1140/epjc/s10052-016-4499-5. ISSN 1434-6044. PMC 5335599. PMID 28316497.
- The ATLAS collaboration; Aad, G.; Abbott, B.; Abdallah, J.; Abdel Khalek, S.; Abdinov, O.; Aben, R.; Abi, B.; Abolins, M.; AbouZeid, O. S.; Abramowicz, H. (April 2015). "Evidence for the Higgs-boson Yukawa coupling to tau leptons with the ATLAS detector". Journal of High Energy Physics. 2015 (4): 117. arXiv:1501.04943. Bibcode:2015JHEP...04..117A. doi:10.1007/JHEP04(2015)117. ISSN 1029-8479.
- CDF Collaboration; Abulencia, A.; et al. (December 2006). "Observation of B⁰_s - anti-B⁰_s oscillations". Physical Review Letters. 97 (24) 242003. arXiv:hep-ex/0609040. doi:10.1103/PhysRevLett.97.242003. hdl:10067/815500151162165141. PMID 17280271.
