= ARGUS (experiment) =

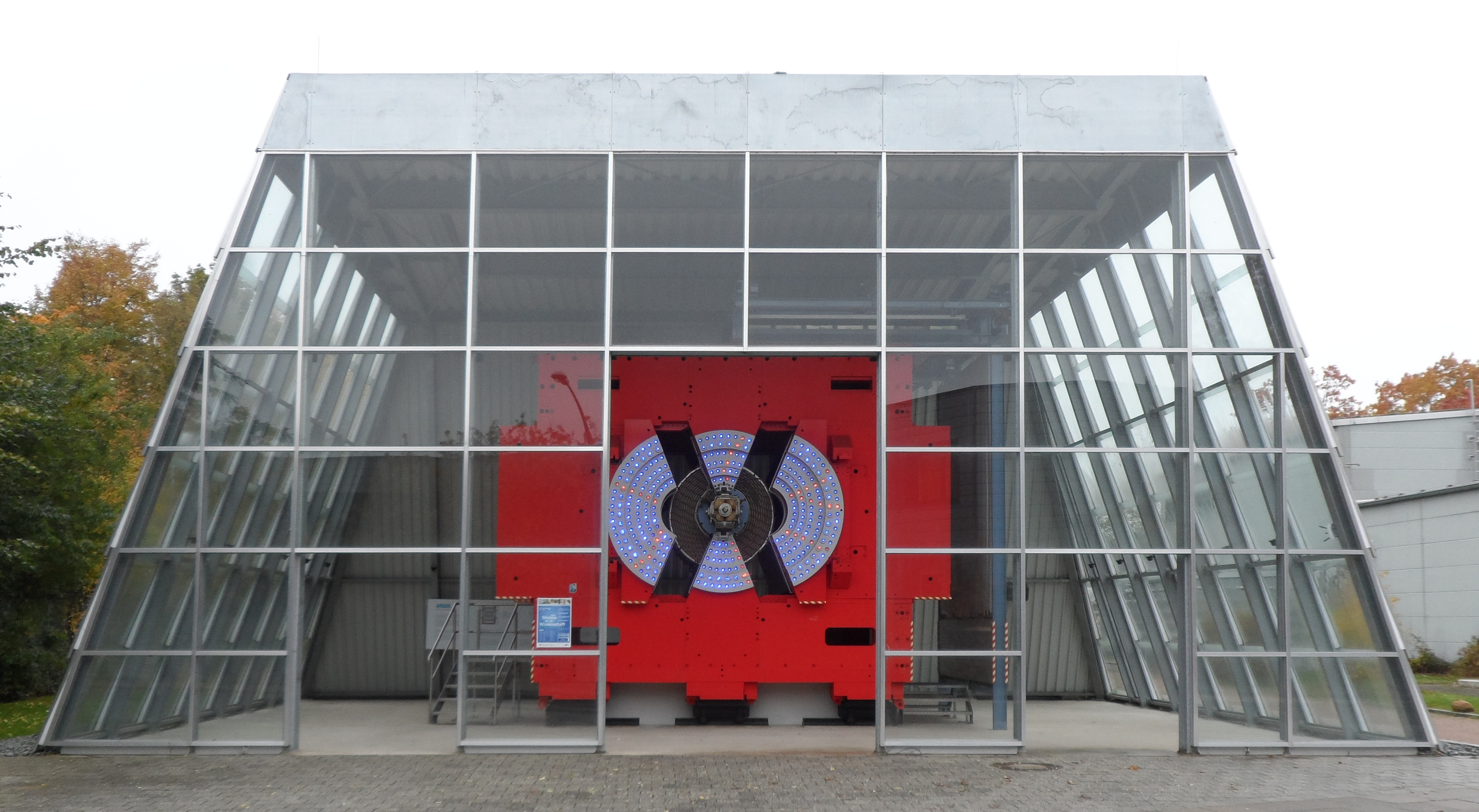
The ARGUS detector at DESY research facility, exposed as an exhibit after decommissioning.

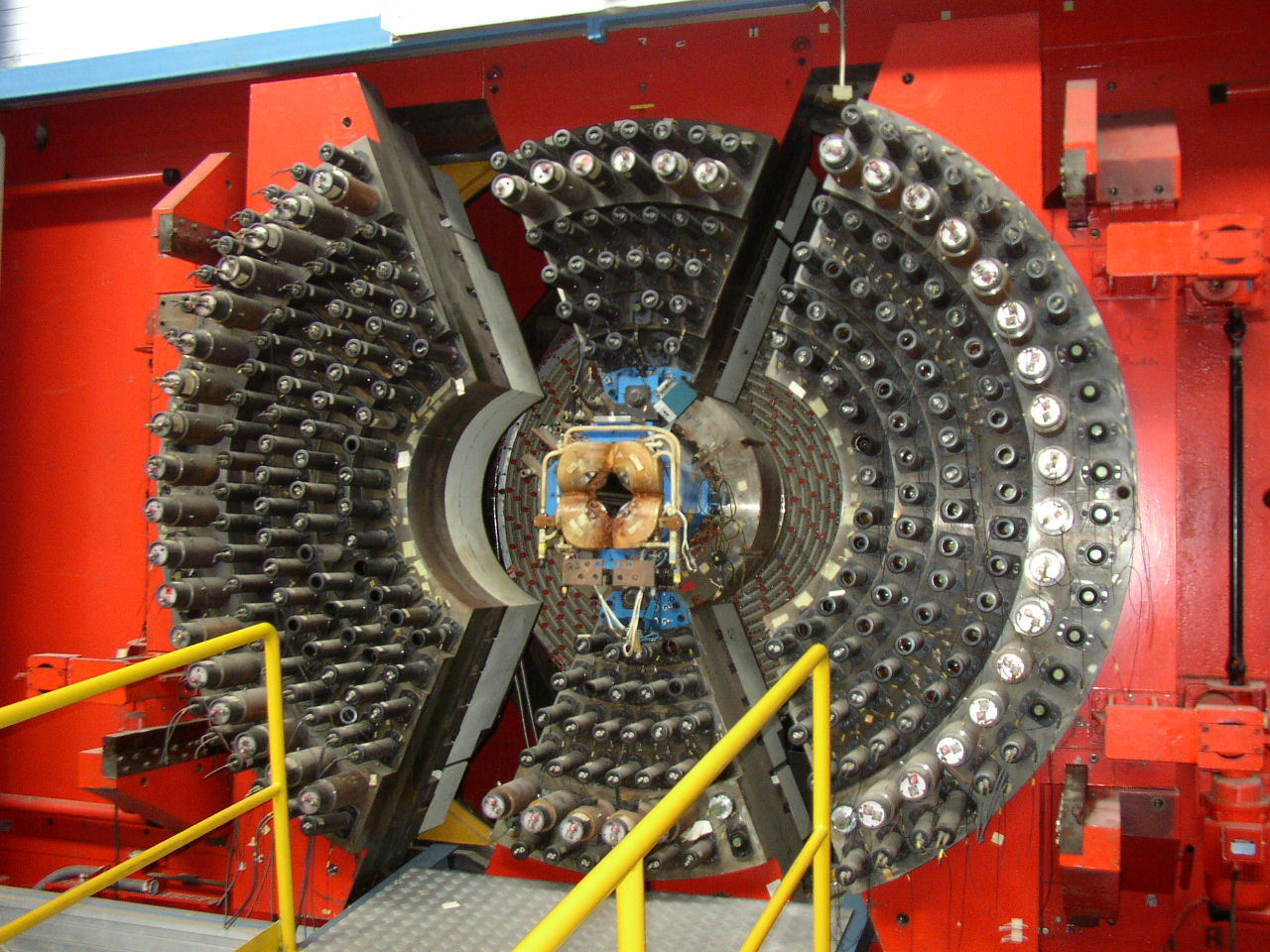
Detailed image of the ARGUS detector.

ARGUS (A Russian-German-United States-Swedish Collaboration; later joined by Canada and the former Yugoslavia) was a particle physics experiment that ran at the electron–positron collider ring DORIS II at the German national laboratory DESY. Its aim was to explore properties of charm and bottom quarks. Its construction started in 1979, the detector was commissioned in 1982 and operated until 1992.

The ARGUS detector was a hermetic detector with 90% coverage of the full solid angle. It had drift chambers, a time-of-flight system, an electromagnetic calorimeter and a muon chamber system.

The ARGUS experiment was the first experiment that observed the mixing of the B mesons into its antiparticle, the anti-B meson; this was done in 1987. This observation led to the conclusion that the second-heaviest quark – the bottom quark – could under certain circumstances convert into a different, hitherto unknown quark, which had to have a huge mass. This quark, the top quark, was discovered in 1995 at Fermilab.

The ARGUS distribution is named after the experiment. In 2010, the former site of ARGUS at DORIS became the location of the OLYMPUS experiment.
