= FLASH =

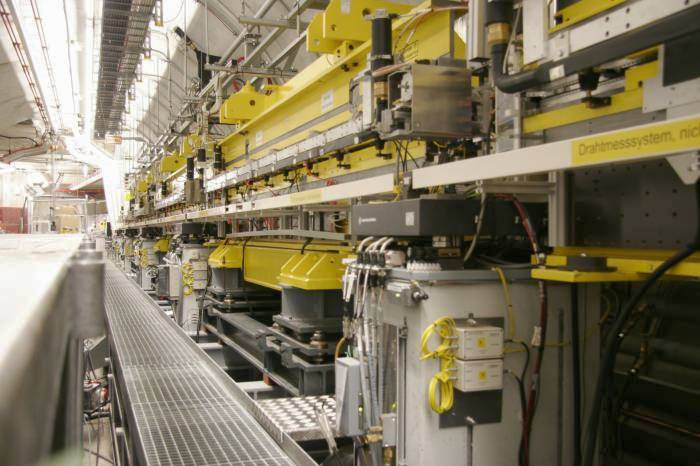
Undulators

FLASH, acronym of Free Electron LASer in Hamburg, is a superconducting particle accelerator-based soft X-ray free-electron laser located at the German national laboratory DESY in Hamburg, Germany. It can generate very powerful, ultrashort pulses (~10^{−14} s) of coherent radiation in the energy range from 10 eV (electronvolt) to 300 eV. It started operation for external users in the year 2005 and is used for surface, molecular and atomic physics experiments. Intended applications are also the imaging of single biological complex molecules with time resolution.

FLASH originated from the TESLA Test Facility (TTF), which was built in 1997 to test the technology foreseen for the planned linear collider TESLA, a project that was replaced by the International Linear Collider (ILC). For this purpose, the TTF was enlarged from 100 m to 260 m. FLASH also served as a test facility for the technology for the European XFEL.

The facility currently serves seven experimental stations. It is also used as a test facility for plasma wakefield acceleration at the FLASHForward experiment. Since 2020, it has been expanded to further optimise the properties of the radiation (FLASH2020+ project).
