= ARGUS distribution =

Probability distribution in physics

ARGUS
- Probability density function c = 1.

- Cumulative distribution function c = 1.
- Parameters: $c > 0$ cut-off (real) $\chi > 0$ curvature (real)
- Support: $x \in (0, c)\!$
- PDF: see text
- CDF: see text
- Mean: $\mu = c\sqrt{\pi/8}\;\frac{\chi e^{-\frac{\chi^2}{4}} I_1(\tfrac{\chi^2}{4})}{ \Psi(\chi) }$ where I_{1} is the Modified Bessel function of the first kind of order 1, and $\Psi(x)$ is given in the text.
- Mode: $\frac{c}{\sqrt2\chi}\sqrt{(\chi^2-2)+\sqrt{\chi^4+4}}$
- Variance: $c^2\!\left(1 - \frac{3}{\chi^2} + \frac{\chi\phi(\chi)}{\Psi(\chi)}\right) - \mu^2$

In physics, the ARGUS distribution, named after the particle physics experiment ARGUS, is the probability distribution of the reconstructed invariant mass of a decayed particle candidate in continuum background.

== Definition ==
The probability density function (pdf) of the ARGUS distribution is:

$$f(x; \chi, c ) = \frac{\chi^3}{\sqrt{2\pi}\,\Psi(\chi)} \cdot
\frac{x}{c^2} \sqrt{1-\frac{x^2}{c^2}}
\exp\bigg\{ -\frac12 \chi^2\Big(1-\frac{x^2}{c^2}\Big) \bigg\},$$

for $0 \leq x < c$. Here $\chi$ and $c$ are parameters of the distribution and

$$\Psi(\chi) = \Phi(\chi)- \chi \phi( \chi ) - \tfrac{1}{2} ,$$

where $\Phi(x)$ and $\phi( x )$ are the cumulative distribution and probability density functions of the standard normal distribution, respectively.

== Cumulative distribution function ==
The cumulative distribution function (cdf) of the ARGUS distribution is

$$F(x) = 1 - \frac{\Psi\left(\chi\sqrt{1-x^2/c^2}\right)}{\Psi(\chi)}$$.

== Parameter estimation ==
Parameter c is assumed to be known (the kinematic limit of the invariant mass distribution), whereas χ can be estimated from the sample X_{1}, ..., X_{n} using the maximum likelihood approach. The estimator is a function of sample second moment, and is given as a solution to the non-linear equation

$$1 - \frac{3}{\chi^2} + \frac{\chi\phi(\chi)}{\Psi(\chi)} = \frac{1}{n}\sum_{i=1}^n \frac{x_i^2}{c^2}$$.

The solution exists and is unique, provided that the right-hand side is greater than 0.4; the resulting estimator $\scriptstyle\hat\chi$ is consistent and asymptotically normal.

== Generalized ARGUS distribution ==
Sometimes a more general form is used to describe a more peaking-like distribution:

$$f(x) = \frac{2^{-p}\chi^{2(p+1)}}{\Gamma(p+1)-\Gamma(p+1,\,\tfrac{1}{2}\chi^2)} \cdot
\frac{x}{c^2} \left( 1 - \frac{x^2}{c^2} \right)^p
\exp\left\{ -\frac12 \chi^2\left(1-\frac{x^2}{c^2}\right) \right\},
\qquad 0 \leq x \leq c,  \qquad c>0,\,\chi>0,\,p>-1$$
$$F(x) = \frac{\Gamma\left(p+1,\,\tfrac{1}{2}\chi^2\left( 1 - \frac{x^2}{c^2} \right)\right)-\Gamma(p+1,\,\tfrac{1}{2}\chi^2)}{\Gamma(p+1)-\Gamma(p+1,\,\tfrac{1}{2}\chi^2)},
\qquad 0 \leq x \leq c,  \qquad c>0,\,\chi>0,\,p>-1$$

where Γ(·) is the gamma function, and Γ(·,·) is the upper incomplete gamma function.

Here parameters c, χ, p represent the cutoff, curvature, and power respectively.

The mode is:

$$\frac{c}{\sqrt2\chi}\sqrt{(\chi^2-2p-1)+\sqrt{\chi^2(\chi^2-4p+2)+(1+2p)^2}}$$

The mean is:

$$\mu=c \,p \, \sqrt{\pi}\frac{\Gamma(p)}{\Gamma(\tfrac{5}{2}+p)}\frac{\chi^{2p+2}}{2^{p+2}}\frac{M\left(p+1,\tfrac{5}{2}+p,-\tfrac{\chi^2}{2}\right)}{\Gamma(p+1)-\Gamma(p+1,\,\tfrac{1}{2}\chi^2)}$$

where M(·,·,·) is the Kummer's confluent hypergeometric function.

The variance is:

$$\sigma^2=c^2 \frac{\left(\frac{\chi}{2} \right)^{p+1}\chi^{p+3}e^{-\tfrac{\chi^2}{2}}+\left(\chi^2-2(p+1)\right)\left\{\Gamma(p+2)-\Gamma(p+2,\,\tfrac{1}{2}\chi^2)\right\}}
{\chi^2(p+1)\left(\Gamma(p+1)-\Gamma(p+1,\,\tfrac{1}{2}\chi^2)\right)}-\mu^2$$

p = 0.5 gives a regular ARGUS, listed above.
