= Beate Naroska =

German physicist

Beate Naroska (1943 – 17 February 2008) was a German physicist and professor at the University of Hamburg who worked in the field of particle physics.

== Career ==
From 1972 until 1978, Naroska worked at CERN, working with a group led by Carlo Rubbia on diffractive processes. In 1978, Naroska returned to DESY, where she worked on the JADE collaboration, working with particle accelerators.

In 1989, Naroska became a professor at the University of Hamburg. From 1989 until 2005, Naroska was a part of the University of Hamburg's Department of Physics until 2005, and then served the rest of her years on the departments of mathematics, computer science, and natural sciences until her death on February 17, 2008.

== Selected publications ==
- Naroska, B. (1987). “E⁺E⁻ Physics with the JADE Detector at PETRA” (PDF). Physics Reports. 148. doi:10.1016/0370-1573(87)90031-7. - this review served as a habitual thesis which earned Naroska her position as professor at the University of Hamburg.
- Güler, M., Serin-Zeyrek, M., Tolun, P., Zeyrek, M. T., Duchesneau, D., Degré, A., Favier, J., Pessard, H., Muciaccia, M. T., Righini, P., Simone, S., Lu, S. L., Zhou, S. J., Winter, K., Borer, K., Haeberli, C., Hess, M., Klingenberg, R., … & Kodama, K. (2000). An appearance experiment to search for ν_μ → ν_τ oscillations in the CNGS beam: Experimental proposal (Report No. CERN-SPSC-2000-028; LNGS-2000-25; SPSC-P-318) [PDF]. Geneva, Switzerland: CERN. Retrieved from https://cds.cern.ch/record/456523
- Bourhis, L., Fontannaz, M., Guillet, J. P., & Pilon, E. (2002). “Production of J/ψ mesons at HERA.” Journal of Physics G: Nuclear and Particle Physics, 28(5): 997. doi:10.1088/0954-3899/28/5/322.
