= Beate Heinemann =

German particle physicist

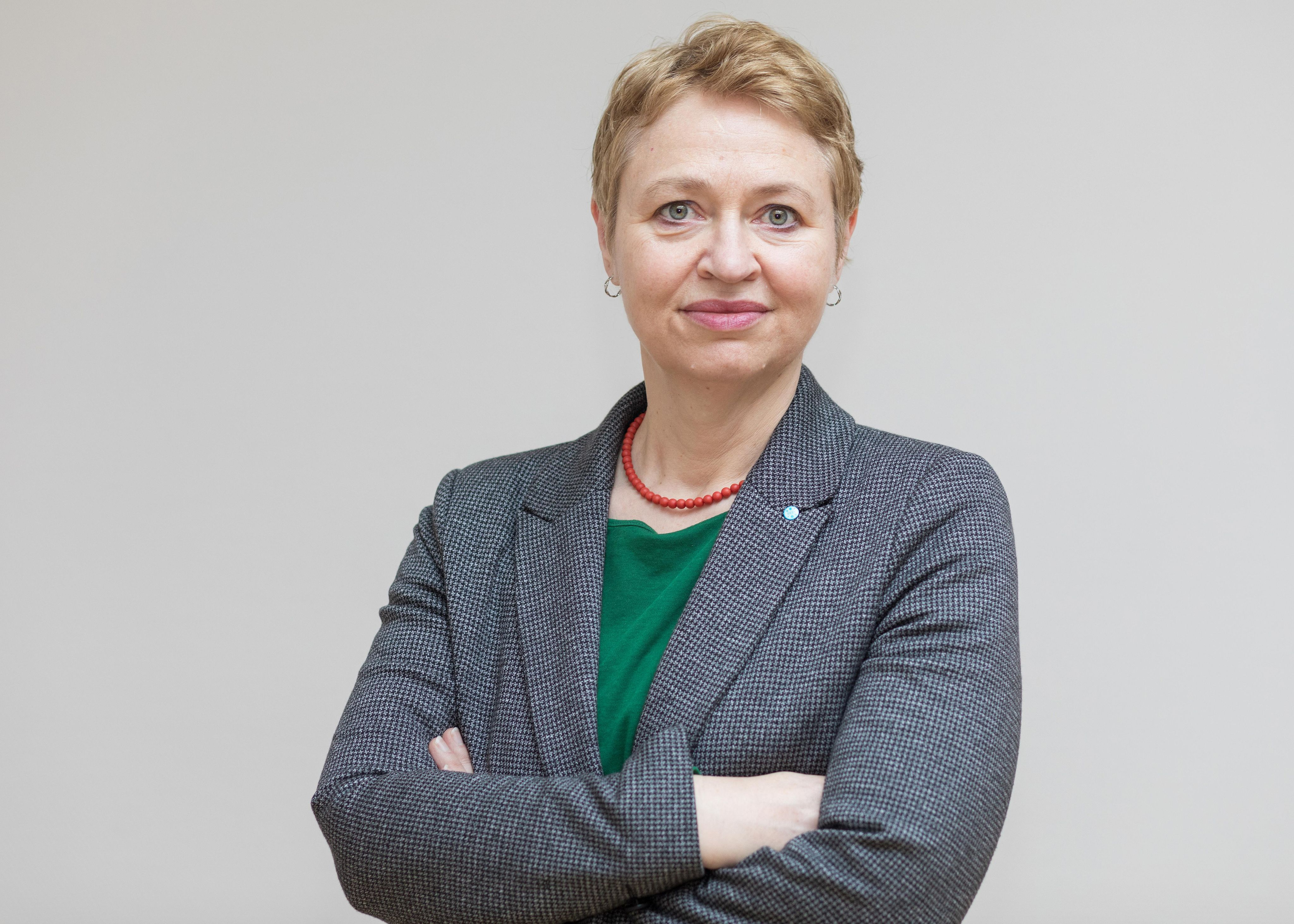
- Heinemann in February 2024
- Scientific career
- Fields: Particle physics
- Institutions: DESY laboratory in Hamburg and the University of Hamburg
- Website: Beate Heinemann

Beate Heinemann is a German particle physicist who has held positions at universities in Europe and the United States. She is Chairperson of the Board of Directors at the DESY laboratory in Hamburg.

== Career ==
Heinemann was born in 1970 in Hamburg. Heinemann earned her undergraduate degree (1996) and PhD (1999) in Physics at the University of Hamburg in Germany. After joining the University of Liverpool in 1999 as PPARC postdoctoral, advanced and later Royal Society University Fellow, she became an associate professor at the University of California, Berkeley and staff scientist at Lawrence Berkeley National Laboratory in 2006. In 2012, she became full professor and senior scientist at the same institutions. In 2016, she returned to Germany to take up a position as Lead Scientist at the research laboratory DESY and a full professorship at the University of Freiburg. In 2022, she became Director in charge of Particle Physics at DESY and full professor of particle physics at the University of Hamburg. On 1 April 2025, she became Chairperson of the Board of Directors at DESY. She is the first woman to hold this role.

== Research ==
She has published several hundred articles in peer reviewed scientific journals. As a particle physicist, Heinemann's research strives for a deeper understanding of the fundamental particles and the role they played in the evolution of the Universe. Her work concentrates on measurements investigating the weak interaction and on searches for dark matter at the Large Hadron Collider (LHC) at CERN near Geneva, Switzerland. Heinemann worked on the H1 experiment at DESY, Hamburg, before starting work in the international CDF collaboration at the Tevatron (a particle accelerator at Fermilab, Batavia, USA, which was shut down in 2011).

In 2007, she became a member of the ATLAS collaboration at CERN, which was one of the two LHC experiments involved in the discovery of the Higgs boson in July 2012. In 2013, she was selected as deputy spokesperson of the ATLAS collaboration at CERN and held this role until 2017. In 2018, she proposed the LUXE experiment at DESY and European XFEL, which would study quantum electrodynamics in the regime of strong fields, and she has been leading the LUXE collaboration of about 100 people until 2023. Heinemann serves on many committees, including the Physics Preparatory Group of the European Particle Particle Strategy Update, the Particle Physics Project Prioritization Panel (P5) in the USA, and the International Committee for Future Accelerators (ICFA), a working group of the International Union of Pure and Applied Physics. She is also very involved in outreach activities for students and the general public, with a special emphasis on disseminating information about the scientific heritage of female scientists like Lise Meitner or Vera Rubin. Interviews with Heinemann have been published in major media like The New York Times, Die Zeit, and Der Spiegel.

== Awards ==
- In 2004, Heinemann was awarded a Royal Society University Research Fellowship at the University of Liverpool.
- In 2009, she was made a fellow of the American Physical Society.
- In 2024, she was elected member of the Academy of Sciences and Humanities in Hamburg.

=== Honorary degrees ===
- 2024 Honorary doctorate Faculty of Mathematics and Natural Sciences University of Zurich
