= H1 (particle detector) =

Coordinates: 53°35′25″N 9°53′04″E

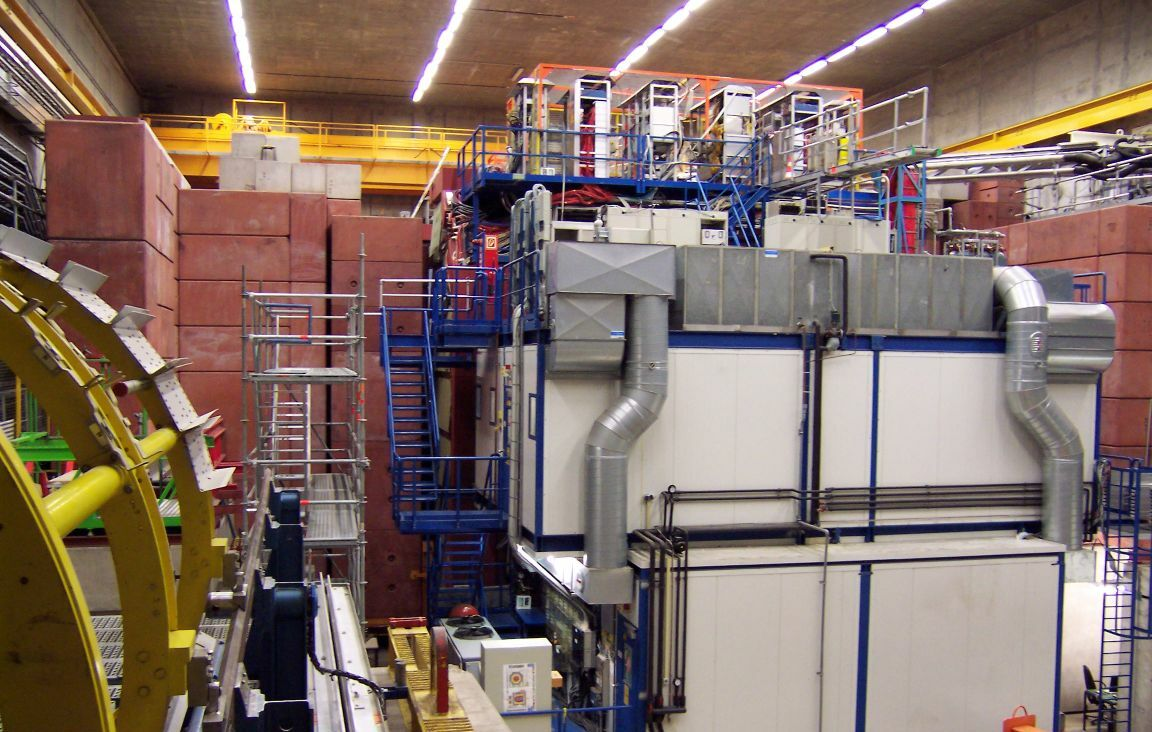
The H1 particle detector at HERA, Hamburg. The detector itself is hidden behind the dark red concrete wall behind the electronics trailer.

H1 was a particle detector operated at the HERA (Hadron Elektron Ring Anlage) collider at the German national laboratory DESY in Hamburg. The first studies for the H1 experiment were proposed in 1981. The H1 detector began operating together with HERA in 1992 and took data until 2007. It consisted of several different detector components, measured about 12 m × 15 m × 10 m and weighed 2800 tons. It was one of four detectors along the HERA accelerator.

The main physics goals of the H1 experiment were the investigation of the internal structure of the proton through measurements of deep inelastic scattering, the measurements of further cross sections to study fundamental interactions between particles in order to test the Standard Model of particle physics, as well as the search for new kinds of matter and unexpected phenomena in particle physics. Scientists continue to publish scientific papers based on data taken by the H1 experiment until today, and the detailed knowledge of the proton gained through experiments like H1 laid the foundation to much of the science done at the Large Hadron Collider (LHC) at the CERN particle physics laboratory today.

The name H1 is used for both the detector itself and the collaboration of physicists and technicians who operated the experiment.

== History ==
The construction of a lepton–proton collider was recommended strongly by the European Committee for Future Accelerators (ECFA) on May 9, 1980. The first proposals for the H1 detector were made in 1981, and the letter of intent for the H1 experiment was published on June 28, 1985. The technical proposal for the H1 detector was finalized on March 25, 1986.

The H1 detector was operational with the first collisions of HERA in 1992. It was upgraded during the HERA luminosity upgrade for the HERA II running period from 2000 to 2003. The H1 detector then took data until the shutdown of HERA in June 2007 and was mostly dismantled afterwards.

Several subdetector components are now exhibited in the HERA Hall West at DESY. The HERA North Hall, where the H1 detector was located, is now used for the new ALPS experiment, which looks for axion-like particles.

The data taken with the H1 detector are preserved for future analyses within the DPHEP (Data Preservation and Long Term Analysis in High Energy Physics) initiative.

The "sister experiment" of H1 at the HERA accelerator was the ZEUS experiment, which was also a multi-purpose detector with similar physics goals to H1.

== The H1 collaboration ==
The H1 experiment was designed and operated by an international collaboration of about 400 physicists and technicians from 43 institutes in 18 countries (List of currently participating institutes).

== The H1 detector ==
Leptons (electrons or positrons) collided with protons in the interaction point of H1, and the particles produced in these collisions were detected by the H1 detector components. The collision products, often including the proton remnant and the scattered lepton, were detected by several subdetectors. Combining their information allowed the identification of particles from the interaction, or at least the reconstruction of the overall reaction kinematics. This in turn allowed the classification of the reaction. From the center outwards, H1's most important systems were:

- Silicon trackers for the determination of primary and secondary vertices
- Jet chambers for the measurement of charged particle tracks
- Liquid argon (LAr) calorimeter for the measurement of electromagnetic and hadronic showers
- Lead/scintillating fibre calorimeter (SpaCal) in the backward direction for the measurement of the scattered lepton
- Superconducting solenoidal magnet to bend the charged particles' trajectories
- Muon detectors in the iron magnet yoke surrounding H1 and in the forward direction.

In addition to these systems, H1 had several helper systems, such as a luminosity system, time of flight (ToF) detectors and radiation monitors. Other detector systems were added as the focus on special physics processes was extended, for example, forward instrumentation for diffractive physics far down the HERA tunnel.

While H1 was a general-purpose detector, its main design feature was an asymmetric construction to cope with the boosted center of mass in the laboratory frame due to the large energy imbalance of the colliding beams. In the forward (incident proton) direction, the instrumentation had higher granularity to give a better resolution for refined measurements of the proton remnant left after the collision with the incident lepton. In the backward direction, into which the lepton was mostly scattered, the detectors were optimized for the reconstruction of the scattered lepton trajectory.

== Physics addressed by H1 ==
The most interesting physics topics treated at H1 include

- Cross section measurements of reactions with charged and neutral electroweak currents
- Studies of proton structure and determination of quark and gluon parton distribution functions
- Tests of quantum chromodynamics (QCD) in jet and particle production
- Production of heavy quarks (charm and bottom)
- Tests of electroweak theory
- Diffraction (physics with the exchange of a pomeron)
- Search for physics beyond the Standard Model (for example, the substructure of quarks / contact interactions, leptoquarks, magnetic monopoles)

== See also ==
- HERA
- ZEUS
- HERMES
- HERA-B
