= DORIS (particle accelerator) =

Particle accelerator at DESY

The Double-Ring Storage Facility (DORIS) was an electron–positron storage ring at the German national laboratory DESY. It was DESY's second circular accelerator and its first storage ring, with a circumference of nearly 300 m. After construction was completed in 1974, DORIS provided collision experiments with electrons and their antiparticles at energies of 3.5 GeV per beam. In 1978, the energy of the beams was raised to 5 GeV each.

With evidence of "excited charmonium states", DORIS made an important contribution to the process of proving the existence of heavy quarks. In the same year, the first tests of X-ray lithography were performed at DESY.

In 1987, the ARGUS detector at the DORIS storage ring was the first experiment to observe the conversion of a B meson into its antiparticle, the anti-B meson.

The Hamburg Synchrotron Radiation Laboratory HASYLAB was commissioned in 1980 to use synchrotron radiation, which was generated at DORIS as a byproduct, for research. While DORIS was only used as a synchrotron radiation source for roughly a third of its running time in the beginning, the provision of synchrotron radiation became its sole purpose from 1993 onwards under the name DORIS III. In order to achieve more intense and controllable radiation, DORIS was upgraded in 1984 with wigglers and undulators. By means of a special array of permanent magnets, the accelerated positrons could now be brought onto a slalom course, increasing the intensity of the emitted synchrotron radiation by a factor of 100 in comparison to conventional storage ring systems.

Among the many studies carried out with the synchrotron radiation generated by DORIS, from 1986 to 2004, the Israeli biochemist Ada Yonath (Nobel Prize in Chemistry 2009) conducted experiments that led to her deciphering the ribosome.

DORIS III served 36 photon beamlines, where 45 instruments were operated in rotation. The overall beam time per year amounted to 8 to 10 months. It was finally shut down at the end of 2012.

== OLYMPUS ==
The former site of the ARGUS detector at DORIS became the location of the OLYMPUS experiment in 2010. OLYMPUS used the toroidal magnet and pair of drift chambers from the MIT-Bates BLAST experiment along with refurbished time-of-flight detectors and multiple luminosity monitoring systems. OLYMPUS measured the positron–proton to electron–proton cross section ratio to precisely determine the size of two-photon exchange in elastic electron–proton scattering. Two-photon exchange may resolve the proton form factor discrepancy between recent measurements made using polarization techniques and ones using the Rosenbluth separation method. OLYMPUS took data in 2012 and 2013, and first results were published in 2017.
