= HERA-B =

Particle physics experiment

The HERA-B detector was a particle physics experiment at the HERA accelerator at the German national laboratory DESY that collected data from 1993 to 2003. It measured 8 m × 20 m × 9 m and weighed 1000 tons. The HERA-B collaboration consisted of some 250 scientists from 32 institutes in 13 countries.

Its primary aim was to measure CP violation in the decays of heavy B mesons in the late 1990s, several years ahead of the Large Hadron Collider and B Factory programs. Unlike most particle physics detectors, the particles were produced not by colliding two circulating beams head-on, nor by slamming the beam into a stationary target, but by moving a thin wire target directly into the waste 'halo' of the circulating proton beam of the HERA accelerator. The beam was unaffected by this 'scraping' but the collision rate produced could be made extremely high, around 5 to 10 million interactions per second (5–10 MHz). The collaboration developed a novel scheme for moving the wires and the vertex detectors very close to the beam (less than one centimetre), using a vacuum chamber and motorised 'arms', had to be developed.
