= HERA (particle accelerator) =

Particle accelerator at DESY

Coordinates: 53.581°N 9.887°E

HERA (German: Hadron-Elektron-Ringanlage, English: Hadron–Electron Ring Accelerator) was a particle accelerator at DESY in Hamburg. It was operated from 1992 to 30 June 2007. At HERA, electrons or positrons were brought to collision with protons at a center-of-mass energy of 320 GeV. HERA was used mainly to study the structure of protons and the properties of quarks, laying the foundation for much of the science done at the Large Hadron Collider (LHC) at the CERN particle physics laboratory today. HERA is the only lepton–proton collider in the world to date and was on the energy frontier in certain regions of the kinematic range.

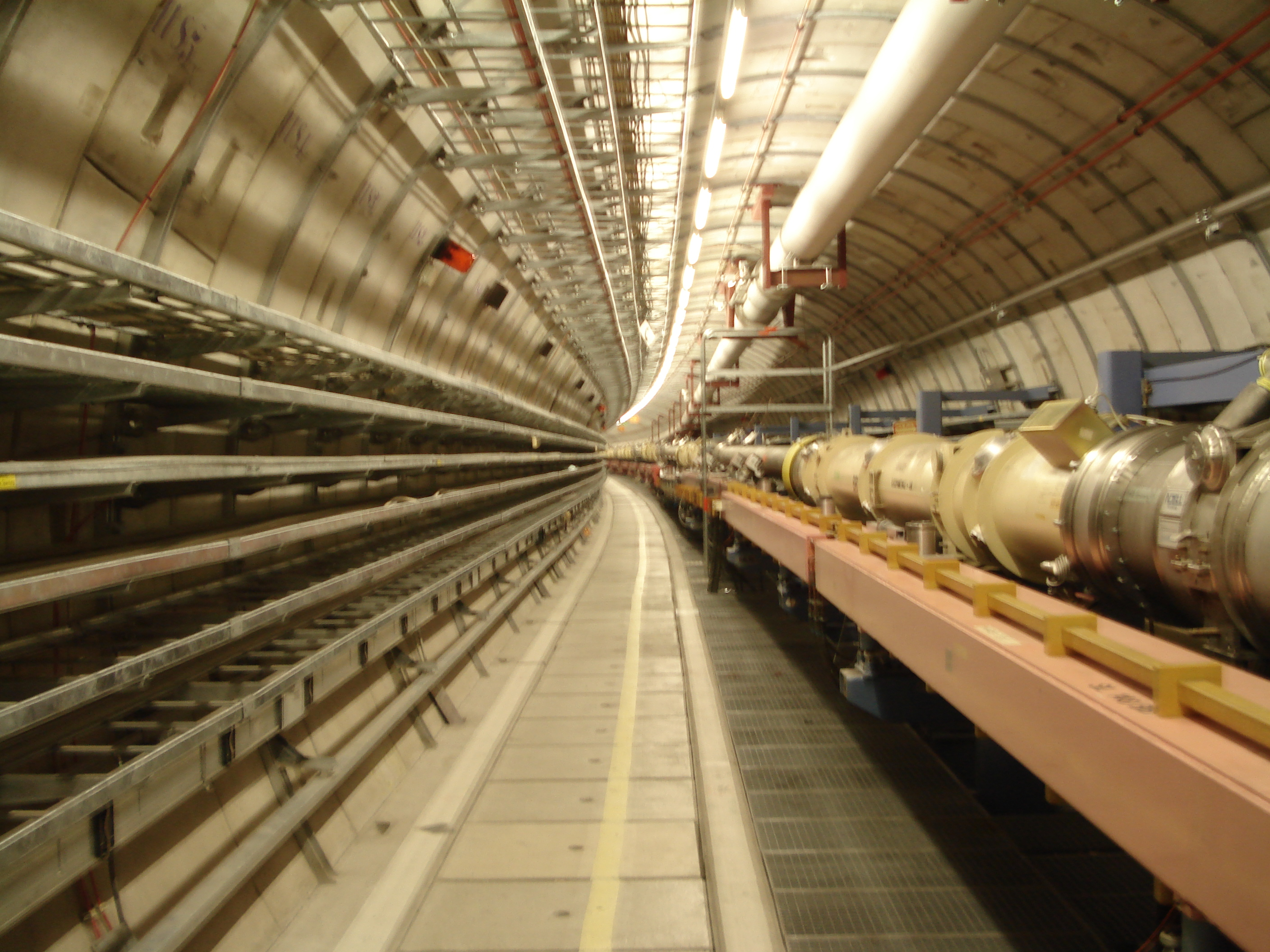
A small segment of the HERA tunnel. The proton beam is travelling in the large vacuum tube in the middle to the right, the electron beam tube is below that.

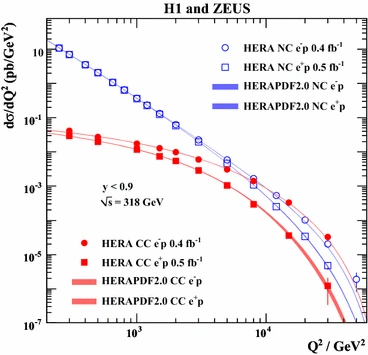
The EW interaction is mediated to first order therefore when the momentum transfer-squared becomes bigger than the mass of the charged W and the neutral Z boson squared (<10^{4}) the magnitude of their differential cross sections become comparable so the charged and neutral currents (CC (red) & NC (blue)) appear indistinguishable but it also becomes lower so they look hard to distinguish from the massless photon too, that is EW unification starts to set in.

To collide protons with either electrons or positrons, HERA used mainly superconducting magnets, which was also a world first. At HERA, it was possible to study the structure of protons up to 30 times more accurately than before. The resolution covered structures 1/1000 of the proton in size, facilitating many discoveries concerning the composition of protons from quarks and gluons.

The HERA tunnel runs 10 to 25 m below ground level and has a circumference of 6.3 km and an inner diameter of 5.2 m. For the construction, the same technology was used as for the construction of subway tunnels. Two storage rings were located on top of each other inside the tube. One accelerated electrons to energies of 27.5 GeV, the other one protons to energies of 920 GeV in the opposite direction. Both beams completed their circle nearly at the speed of light, making approximately 47000 revolutions per second.

There are four interaction regions around the ring, which were used by the experiments H1, ZEUS, HERMES and HERA-B. All these experiments were particle detectors run by international groups of researchers. These groups developed, constructed and ran the multi-storey, complex measurement devices in many years of cooperative work and evaluated enormous amounts of data.

== HERA accelerators ==
Leptons (electrons or positrons) were pre-accelerated to 450 MeV in the linear accelerator LINAC II. From there, they were injected into the storage ring DESY II and accelerated further to 7.5 GeV before their transfer into the storage ring PETRA, where they were accelerated to 14 GeV. Finally, they were injected into their storage ring in the HERA tunnel and reached a final energy of 27.5 GeV. This storage ring was equipped with warm (non-superconducting) magnets keeping the leptons on their circular track by a magnetic field of 0.17 tesla.

Protons were obtained from originally negatively charged hydrogen ions and pre-accelerated to 50 MeV in a linear accelerator. They were then injected into the proton synchrotron DESY III and accelerated further to 7 GeV. Then they were transferred to PETRA, where they were accelerated to 40 GeV. Finally, they were injected into their storage ring in the HERA tunnel and reached their final energy of 920 GeV. The proton storage ring used superconducting magnets to keep the protons on track.

The lepton beam in HERA became naturally transversely polarised through the Sokolov–Ternov effect. The characteristic build-up time expected for the HERA accelerator was approximately 40 minutes. Spin rotators on either side of the experiments changed the transverse polarisation of the beam into longitudinal polarisation. The positron beam polarisation was measured using two independent polarimeters, the transverse polarimeter (TPOL) and the longitudinal polarimeter (LPOL). Both devices exploit the spin-dependent cross section for Compton scattering of circularly polarised photons off positrons to measure the beam polarisation. The transverse polarimeter was upgraded in 2001 to provide a fast measurement for every positron bunch, and position-sensitive silicon strip and scintillating-fibre detectors were added to investigate systematic effects.

On 30 June 2007 at 11:23 pm, HERA was shut down, and dismantling of the four experiments started. HERA's main pre-accelerator PETRA was converted into a synchrotron radiation source, operated under the name PETRA III since 2009. Today, a section of the HERA tunnel and 24 former superconducting dipole magnets are being used for the new ALPS experiment, which looks for axion-like particles.

== International project HERA ==
The construction of HERA was one of the first truly internationally financed projects of this magnitude. Previously, the construction of scientific facilities was always financed by the country in which they were located. Only the costs for the experiments were borne by the conducting national or foreign institutes. Due to the enormous scope of the HERA project, many international institutions agreed to participate already in the construction.

More than 45 institutes and 320 corporations participated in the construction of the facility with donations of money or materials, and more than 20% of the costs were borne by foreign institutions.

Following the example of HERA, many large-scale scientific projects have since then been financed jointly by several countries. This model has become established and international cooperation is moderately common in the construction of those facilities.

== HERA experiments ==
=== H1 ===
H1 was a universal detector for the collision of electrons and protons, located in the HERA Hall North. It measured 12 m × 10 m × 15 m, weighed 2800 tons and was operated from 1992 to 2007. It was designed for probing the inner structure of the proton, the exploration of the strong interaction as well as the search for new kinds of matter and unexpected phenomena in particle physics.

==== ZEUS ====
Like H1, ZEUS was a detector for electron–proton collisions, located in the HERA Hall South. It measured 12 m × 11 m × 20 m, weighed 3600 tons and was operated from 1992 to 2007. Its tasks were similar to those of H1.

==== HERA-B ====
HERA-B was an experiment in the HERA Hall West, which collected data from 1999 to February 2003. By using HERA's proton beam, researchers at HERA-B conducted experiments on heavy quarks. The detector measured 8 m × 20 m × 9 m and weighed 1000 tons.

==== HERMES ====
The HERMES experiment in the HERA Hall East was operated from 1995 to 2007. HERA's longitudinally polarised electron beam was used to explore the spin structure of nucleons. For this purpose, the electrons were scattered at energies of 27.5 GeV at an internal gas target. This target and the detector itself were designed especially with a view to spin-polarised physics. The detector measured 3.5 m × 8 m × 5 m and weighed 400 tons.

== See also ==
- CLAS
- LEPS
