= ZEUS (particle detector) =

Coordinates: 53°34′29″N 9°53′44″E

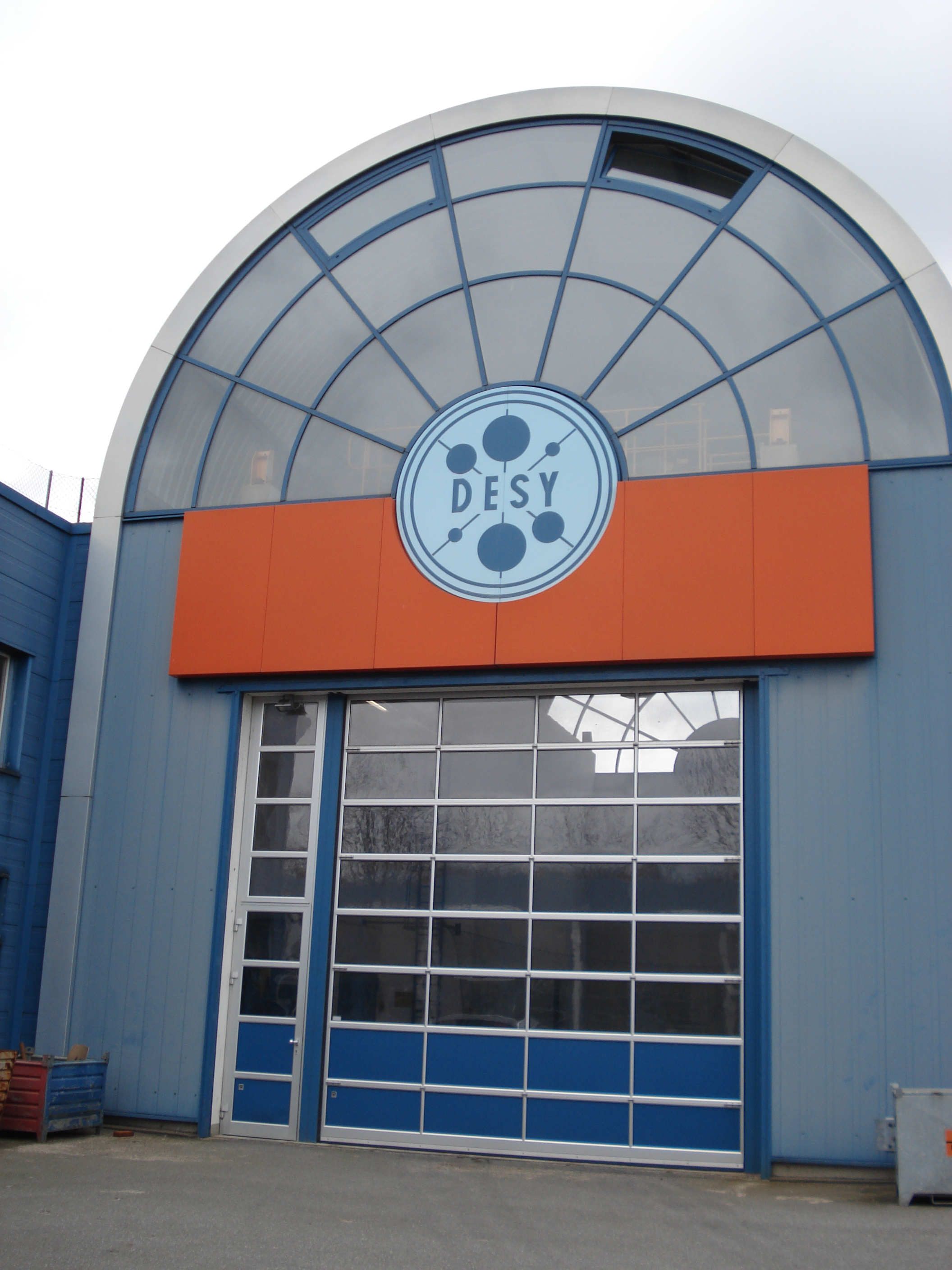
The HERA South Hall where the ZEUS experiment was located.

ZEUS was a particle detector at the HERA (Hadron Elektron Ring Anlage) particle accelerator at the German national laboratory DESY in Hamburg. It began taking data in 1992 and was operated until HERA was decommissioned in June 2007. The scientific collaboration behind ZEUS consisted of about 400 physicists and technicians from 56 institutes in 17 countries.

The ZEUS detector comprised many different detector components, including a depleted uranium plastic-scintillator calorimeter, a central tracking detector (which was a wire chamber), a silicon microvertex detector and muon chambers. In addition, a solenoid provided a 1.43 T magnetic field. The ZEUS detector measured 12 m × 11 m × 20 m and weighed 3600 tons.

Like its partner experiment H1, the ZEUS experiment studied the internal structure of the proton through measurements of deep inelastic scattering by colliding leptons (electrons or positrons) with protons in the interaction point of ZEUS. These measurements were also used to test and study the Standard Model of particle physics as well as to search for particles beyond the Standard Model, laying the foundation to much of the science done at the Large Hadron Collider (LHC) at the CERN particle physics laboratory today.

== Background ==
The German national laboratory DESY was founded in 1959 and started operating its first particle accelerator in 1964. Since then, it has been a highly regarded center for particle physics, photon science, astroparticle physics, and the development, construction and operation of particle accelerators. The design effort for ZEUS can be traced back to 1982. A Letter of Intent was submitted in 1985. The ZEUS detector was operational with the first collisions of the HERA collider in 1992. The last electron–proton collisions at ZEUS were recorded on 30 June 2007. The other multi-purpose experiment at the HERA collider was the competing H1 experiment. Since May 2012, the former ZEUS detector hall has been used as a lab space for the international European XFEL project.

== Detector ==
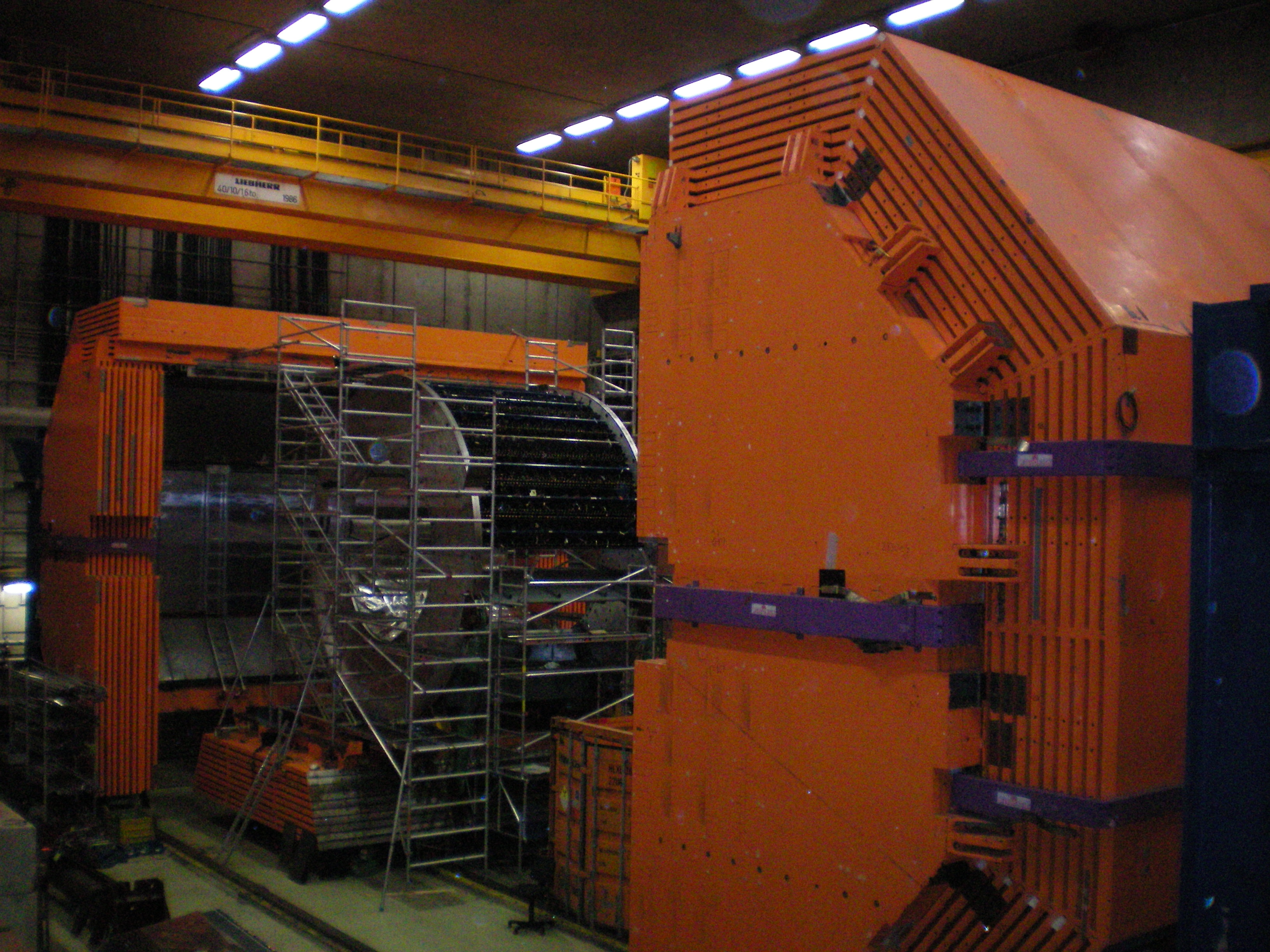
The ZEUS experiment being disassembled, July 2008

The main components of the ZEUS detector were the tracking components, the calorimeter and the muon detectors. The purpose of the ZEUS detector was to collect data to allow the reconstruction of physics events in a consistent way so they can be analyzed.

=== Calorimeter ===
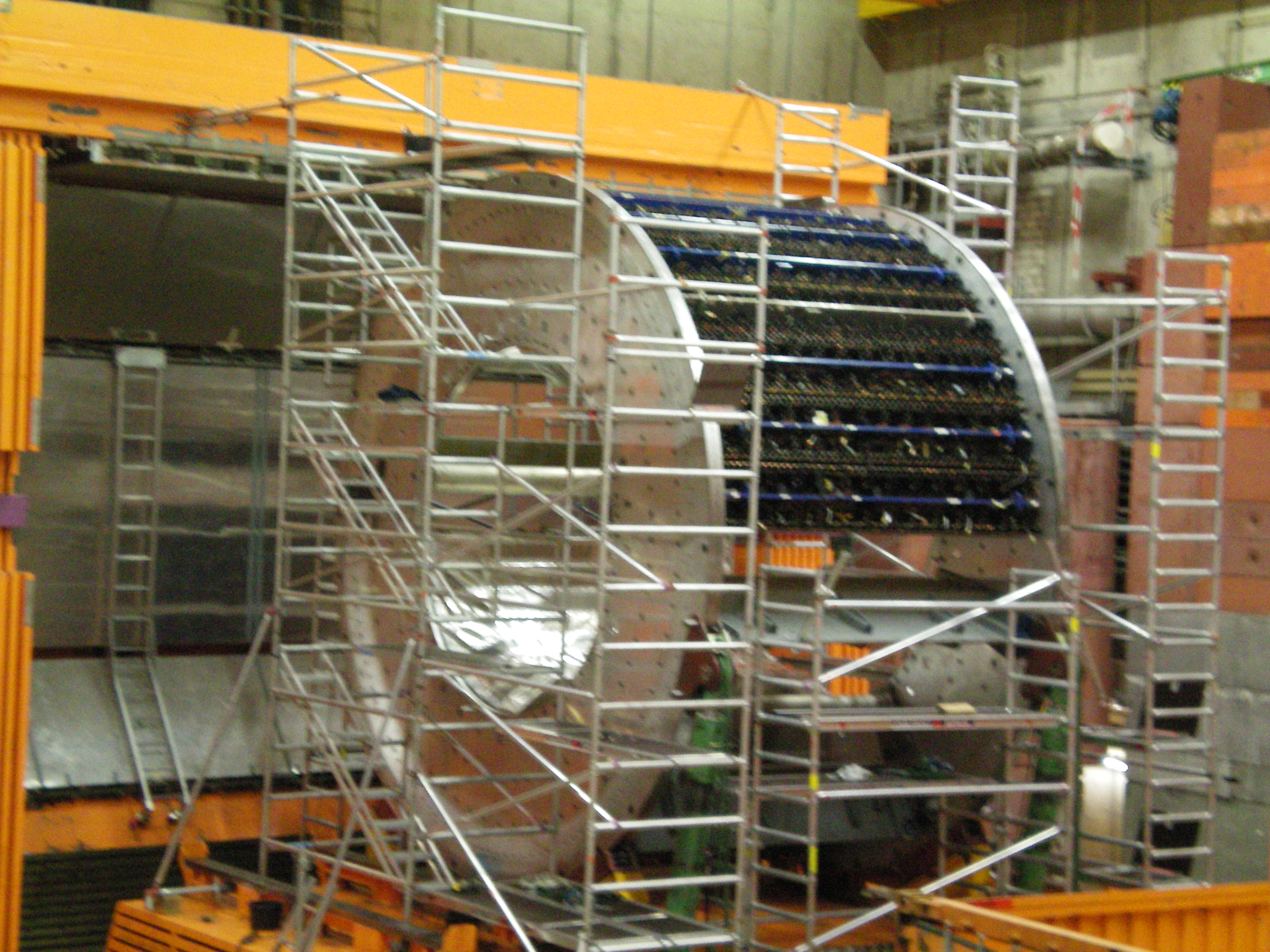
The ZEUS barrel calorimeter undergoing disassembly

The ZEUS Calorimeter was a uranium scintillator based sampling calorimeter and divided into three main sections: the BCAL (Barrel CALorimeter), FCAL (Forward CALorimeter), and RCAL (Rear CALorimeter). Each section was subdivided transversely into towers, and longitudinally into EMC (Electro-Magnetic Calorimeter) or HAC (HAdronic Calorimeter). The smallest subdivision in the calorimeter was called a cell. Each cell was read out by two photomultiplier tubes (PMTs), which helped ensure that there were no holes in the coverage if one of the two PMTs failed.

Uranium was chosen as an absorber so that the calorimeter would be compensating. Electrons and photons deposit energy differently from hadrons, but in a compensating calorimeter the response (e) for an electromagnetic cascade is equal to the response (h) for a hadronic cascade of the same energy (i.e. e/h = 1). In the ZEUS calorimeter neutral pions interacted with uranium atoms to produce slow-moving neutrons which were captured by the scintillator and increased the hadronic signal. Another advantage of using uranium as the absorber was that the natural radioactivity allowed the calorimeter's sensitivity to be conveniently monitored.
