= DESY =

German national research center

- Deutsches Elektronen-Synchrotron
- logo
- Motto: "The Decoding of Matter"
- Established: 18 December 1959
- Research type: Fundamental research
- Budget: c. € 359 million (2024)
- Field of research: Particle accelerators; Particle physics; Photon science; Astroparticle physics
- Director: Beate Heinemann
- Staff: 3,000 (plus over 3,000 guest scientists p.a.)
- Students: c. 500 PhD students and postdocs
- Location: Notkestraße 85, 22607 Hamburg, Germany; Platanenallee 6, 15738 Zeuthen, Germany; 53°34′33″N 9°52′46″E; 52°22′00″N 13°37′00″E
- Campus: Hamburg-Bahrenfeld, Zeuthen
- Affiliations: Helmholtz Association
- Website: desy.de

Map
- Location within Germany

DESY, short for Deutsches Elektronen-Synchrotron (English: German Electron Synchrotron), is a national research centre for fundamental science located in Hamburg and Zeuthen near Berlin in Germany. It operates particle accelerators used to investigate the structure, dynamics and function of matter, and conducts a broad spectrum of interdisciplinary scientific research in four main areas: particle and high energy physics; photon science; astroparticle physics; and the development, construction and operation of particle accelerators. Its name refers to its first project, an electron synchrotron. DESY is publicly financed by the Federal Republic of Germany and the Federal States of Hamburg and Brandenburg and is a member of the Helmholtz Association.

== Functions and mission ==
DESY's function is to conduct fundamental research for solely civil and peaceful purposes. It specialises in particle accelerator development, construction and operation, particle physics, astroparticle physics and photon science research to explore the fundamental relationships between the structure, dynamics and function of matter. In cooperation with its partner organisations, its photon science research spans surface physics, material science, chemistry, molecular biology, geophysics and medicine through the use of synchrotron radiation and free-electron lasers.

In addition to operating its own large accelerator facilities, DESY participates in many major international research projects, for example the European X-Ray Free-Electron Laser in Germany, the Large Hadron Collider in Switzerland, the Belle II experiment in Japan, the IceCube Neutrino Observatory at the South Pole and the worldwide Cherenkov Telescope Array Observatory.

== Sites ==
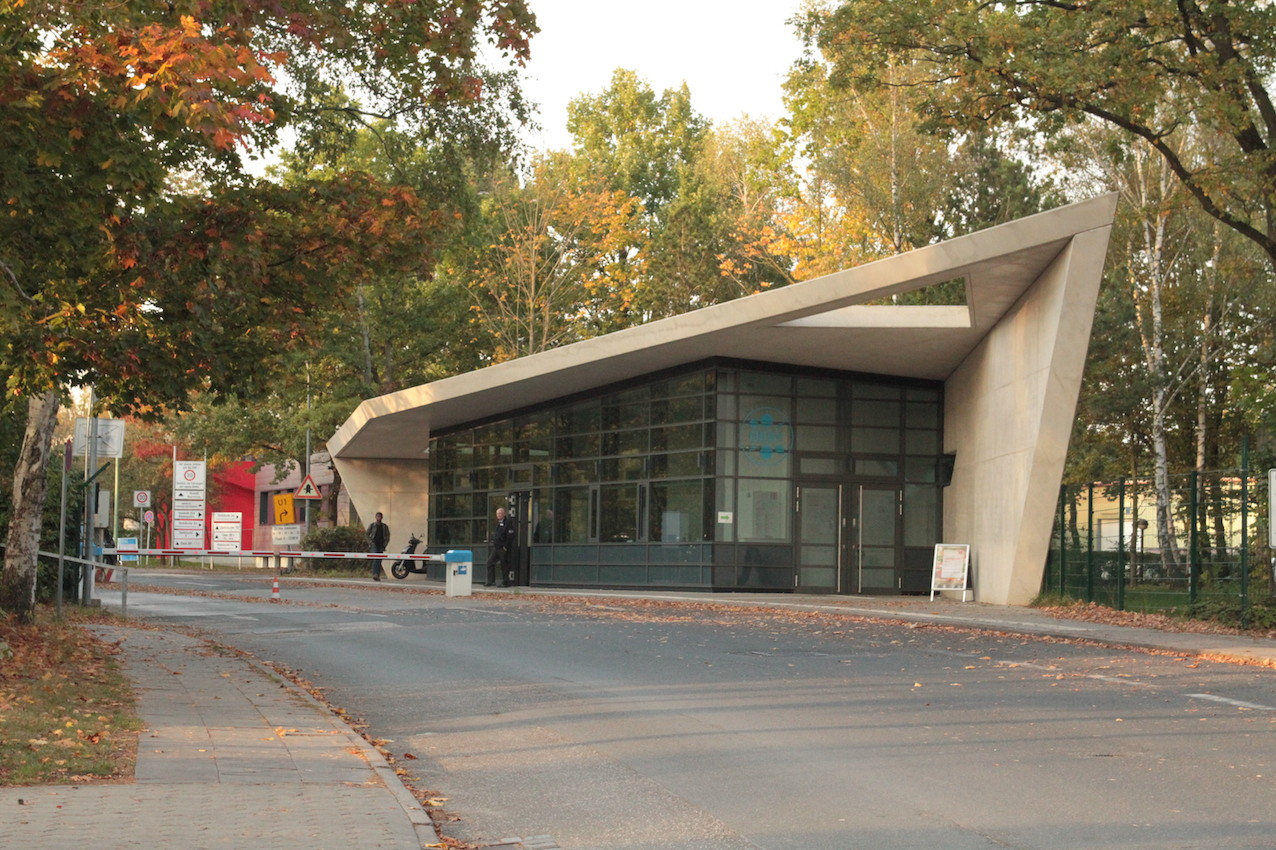
Main entrance of the DESY campus in Hamburg

DESY operates in two locations. The primary location is in the Bahrenfeld quarter of Hamburg. In 1992, DESY expanded to a second site in Zeuthen near Berlin.

=== Hamburg ===
The DESY Hamburg site is located in the quarter Bahrenfeld, in the west of the city in the district of Altona. Its main accelerators are located here.

=== Zeuthen ===
Following German reunification, DESY expanded to a second site in Zeuthen near Berlin. In 1939, the German Postal Ministry founded a nuclear physics laboratory there. After World War II, the laboratory was first named "Institute X", to become the Institute for High Energy Physics (German: Institut für Hochenergiephysik IfH), the high-energy physics laboratory of the German Democratic Republic belonging to the Academy of Sciences of the GDR. The institute was merged with DESY on 1 January 1992. It focuses on parallel computing for theoretical particle physics, the development and construction of electron sources for X-ray lasers as well as astroparticle physics with a focus on gamma-ray and neutrino astronomy.

== Employees and training ==
DESY employs about 3,000 staff members from more than 60 nations. Most staff work at the Hamburg site, with about 270 at the Zeuthen site. These numbers include more than 130 trainees in various industrial-technical professions and about 500 PhD students and postdocs supervised by DESY. In addition, there are numerous master students from various universities.

== Budget and financing ==
The research centre is a foundation under civil law financed by public funds. In 2024, DESY had an annual budget of about 359 million euros (according to the German federal budget plan as part of institutional funding). In addition, it had a project funding income of about 32 million euros. 90% of the annual budget is provided by the German Federal Ministry of Research, Technology and Space and 10% respectively by the Free and Hanseatic City of Hamburg and the German federal state of Brandenburg.

== Particle accelerators and other facilities ==
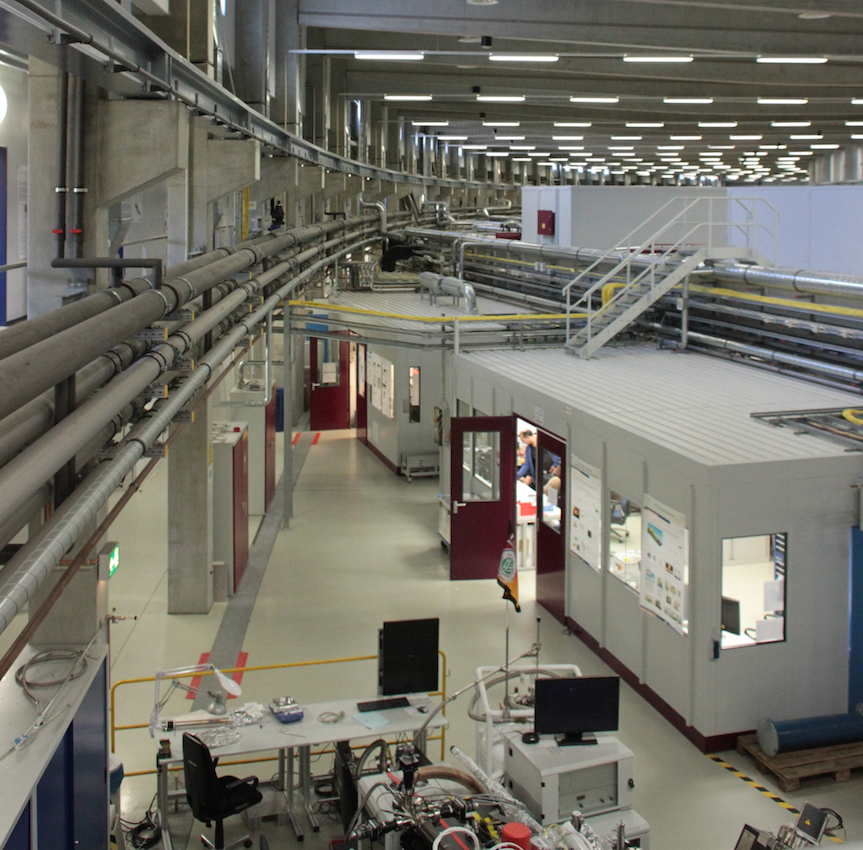
View inside the PETRA III "Max von Laue" hall on the DESY campus in Hamburg

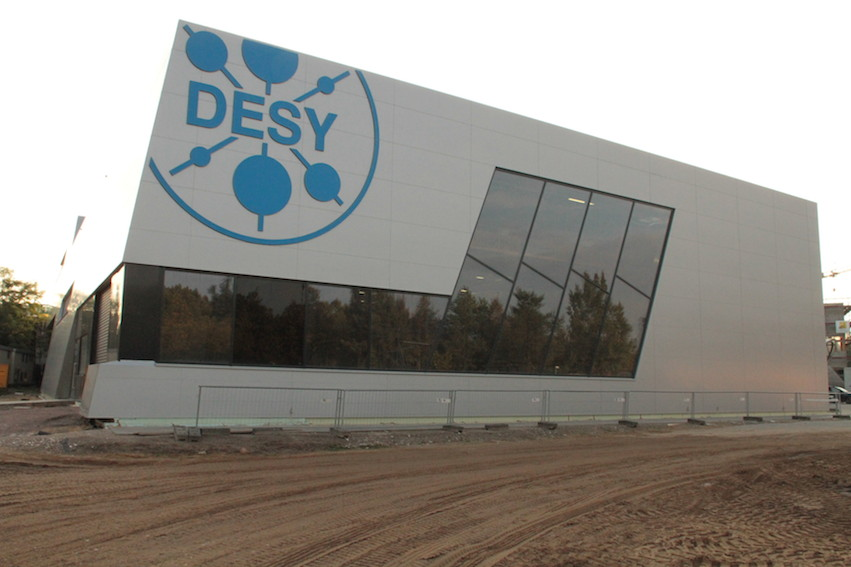
FLASH2 experimental hall on the DESY campus in Hamburg

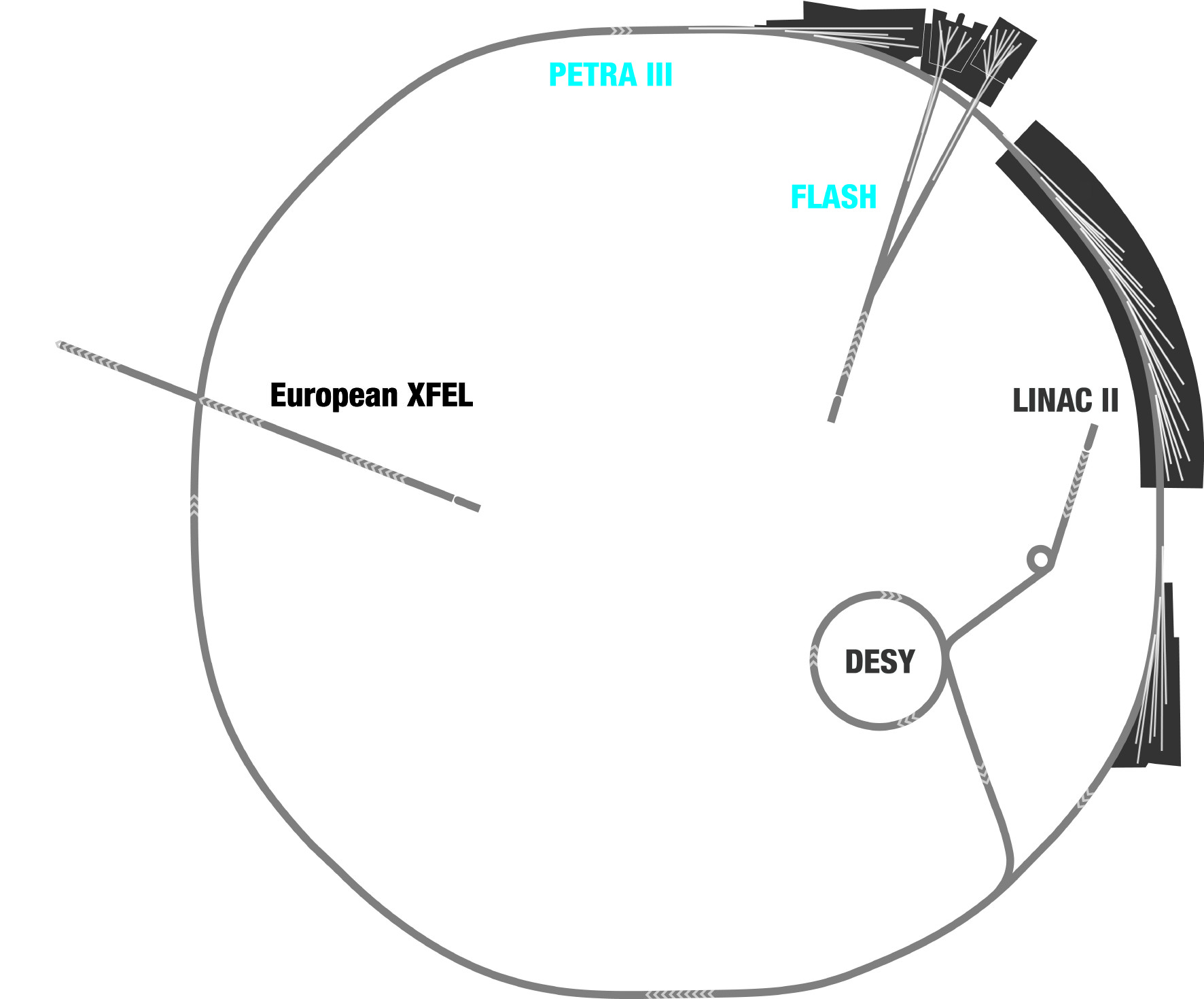
LINAC II and DESY II are electron pre-accelerators for the storage ring PETRA III, which, together with the free-electron laser FLASH, serves as a light source for photon science. Also shown is the European XFEL X-ray laser, which runs from the DESY campus to the town of Schenefeld in Schleswig-Holstein.

DESY's accelerators were not all built at once, but were rather added one by one to meet the growing demand of the scientists for higher and higher energies to gain more insight into particle structures. In the course of the construction of new accelerators, the older ones were converted to pre-accelerators or to sources for synchrotron radiation for laboratories with new research tasks.

=== DESY ===
The DESY synchrotron (short for "Deutsches Elektronen-Synchrotron") has been in operation since 1964. Its circumference is 300 m. It was used until 1978 for particle physics experiments and first measurements with synchrotron radiation. Since then, rebuilt and upgraded several times, it has served as a pre-accelerator and as a test beam facility delivering high-energy particle beams for testing detector systems.

=== DORIS ===
The DORIS storage ring (short for Double Ring Storage Facility) operated from 1974 to 2013. It had a circumference of 289 m. Until 1992, it collided electrons with positrons for particle physics experiments (including the ARGUS experiment). From 1980 on, the synchrotron radiation generated by DORIS was used for photon science experiments; from 1993 to 2012, the storage ring served exclusively as a synchrotron radiation source. The particle physics experiment OLYMPUS then ran in 2012 before DORIS was shut down at the beginning of 2013.

=== PETRA ===
The PETRA storage ring (short for Positron–Electron Tandem Ring Accelerator) has been in operation since 1978. It has a circumference of 2,304 m. Until 1986, electrons and positrons collided in PETRA for research in particle physics (experiments JADE, MARK-J, TASSO and PLUTO). From 1990 on, PETRA served as a pre-accelerator for the HERA storage ring, and from 1995 on also as a synchrotron radiation source with two test experimental stations. Since 2009, the facility has been delivering hard X-ray beams of very high brilliance to over 40 experimental stations under the name PETRA III.

=== HERA ===
The HERA storage ring (short for Hadron–Electron Ring Accelerator) operated from 1992 to 2007. It has a circumference of 6,336 m. It was DESY's largest ring accelerator and Germany's largest research instrument to date. Until 2007, HERA was the only storage ring facility in the world to enable collisions of electrons or positrons with protons for particle physics (experiments H1, ZEUS, HERMES and HERA-B) for studies of the inner structure of the proton.

=== FLASH ===
The free-electron laser (FEL) FLASH (short for Free-Electron Laser in Hamburg) has been in operation since 2000. It has a length of 315 m. It is based on a test facility for superconducting accelerator technology built in 1997 for the TESLA project and has served as a user facility for experiments with the generated FEL radiation since 2005. FLASH provides ultrashort light pulses in the extreme ultraviolet and soft X-ray range for seven experimental stations and is also used as a test facility for the development of accelerator and FEL technologies.

=== European XFEL accelerator ===
DESY operates the 1.7 km superconducting linear accelerator of the European XFEL X-ray free-electron laser, an international research facility that delivers ultrashort light pulses in the high-energy X-ray range.

=== PITZ ===
Since 2001, the DESY site in Zeuthen has been home to the photoinjector test facility PITZ, a linear accelerator used to study, optimise and prepare the electron sources for FLASH and (since 2015) for the European XFEL.

=== Other facilities ===
The building of the former DORIS storage ring now houses the SINBAD ("Short Innovative Bunches and Accelerators at DESY") accelerator complex with various infrastructures for accelerator R&D: the linear accelerator ARES for accelerator research with ultrashort electron pulses for medical purposes, the AXSIS facility for terahertz-driven acceleration to generate ultrashort X-ray pulses for materials science or medical imaging, and the high-power laser KALDERA for research into laser-driven plasma acceleration.

The LUX facility is also used for research into laser-driven plasma acceleration, the FLASHForward experiment at FLASH for electron-beam-driven plasma acceleration. The relativistic electron beam source REGAE generates ultrashort electron pulses for time-resolved diffraction experiments.

The tunnel of the former HERA storage ring now houses the ALPS II experiment, which uses converted superconducting dipole magnets of the HERA proton ring to study extremely light particles.

=== Computing ===
DESY provides extensive storage and computing capacity for research in all its divisions within the Interdisciplinary Data and Analysis Facility (IDAF). The Maxwell HPC Cluster, a high-performance computing platform, serves photon science analysis and accelerator science and operations. As part of the Worldwide LHC Computing Grid (WLCG), DESY operates a Tier-2 computer centre that offers computing and storage systems for the ATLAS, CMS and LHCb experiments at the Large Hadron Collider (LHC). In addition, the DESY grid infrastructure is used by other experiments such as Belle II or IceCube. It is complemented by the National Analysis Facility (NAF) for particle physics data analysis. IDAF storage is provided using DCache and General Parallel File System (GPFS).

== Research areas ==
Research at DESY is organised into four divisions: Accelerators, Photon Science, Particle Physics and Astroparticle Physics.

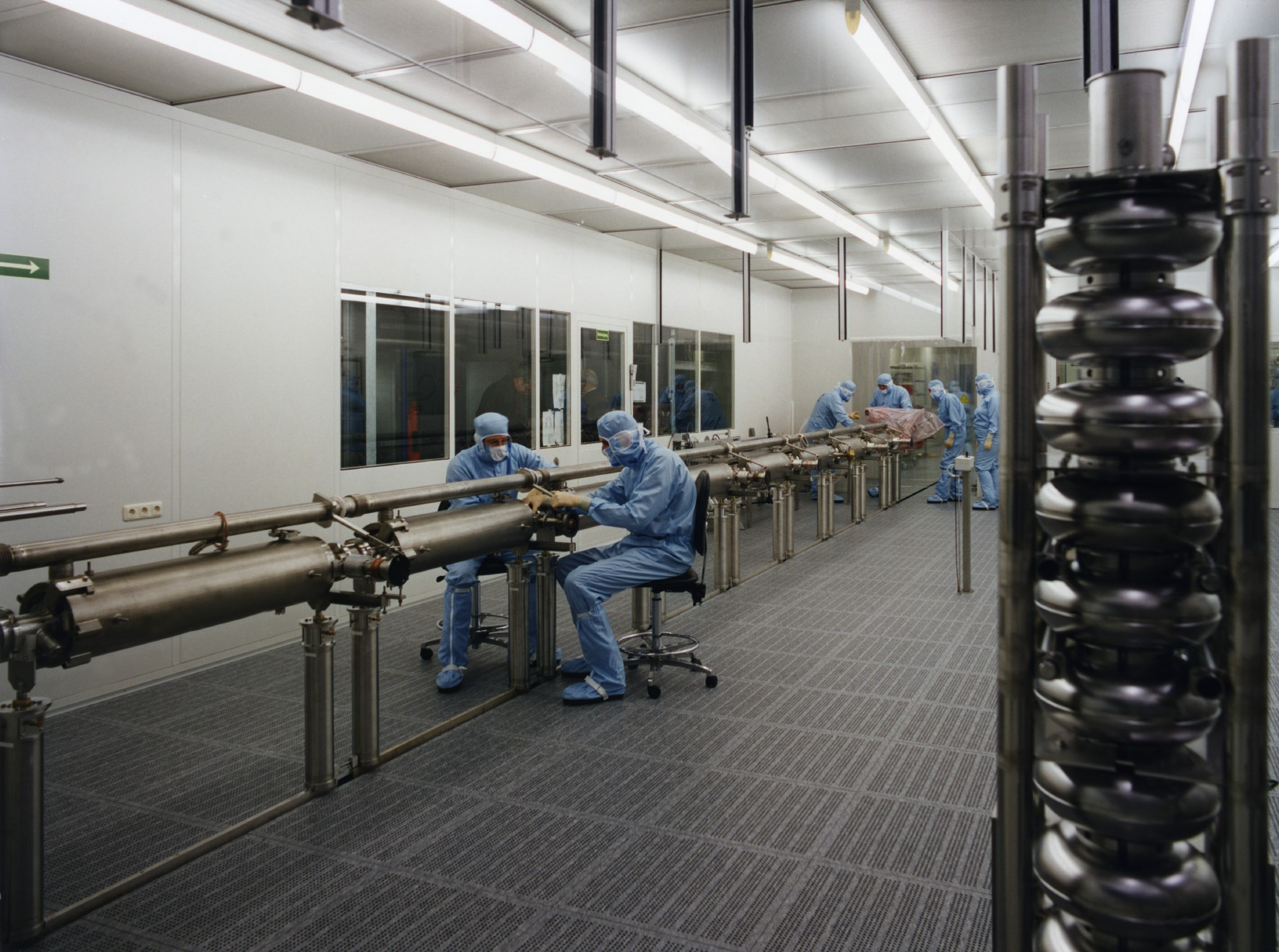
The superconducting resonators used in the linear accelerators of the free-electron laser FLASH and the European XFEL X-ray laser are processed and assembled in a cleanroom.

The Accelerator division develops fundamental technologies for the accelerator facilities that DESY and its partners use in their scientific mission. In addition to the operation and further development of existing facilities (PETRA IV and FLASH2020+ projects, expansion of the European XFEL), essential activities include research into new accelerator concepts, in particular plasma wakefield acceleration, and the improvement of superconducting radio frequency accelerator technology.

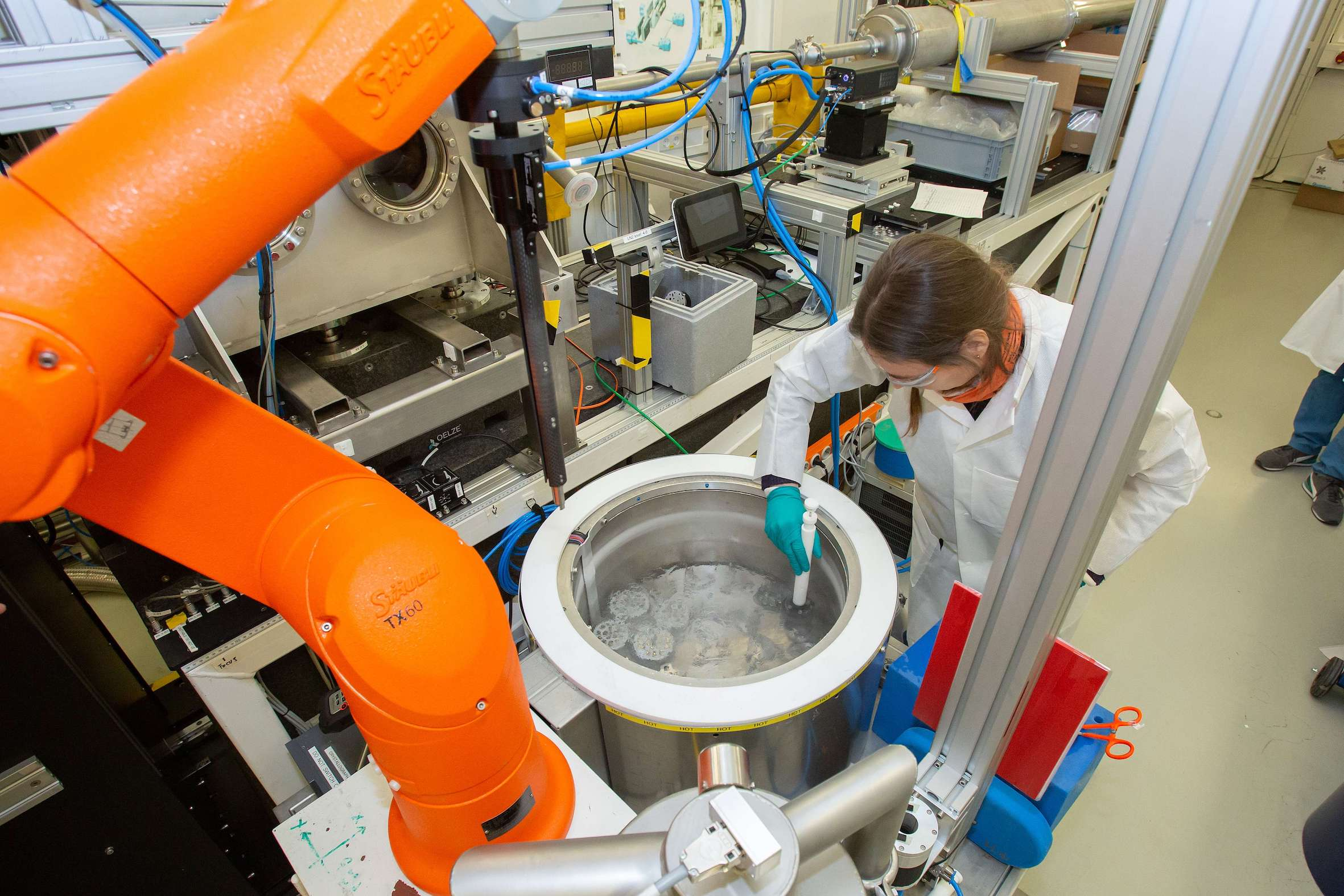
Experiments to investigate the SARS-CoV-2 virus at the PETRA III synchrotron radiation source at DESY

In the Photon Science division, photons are being used to study the structure, dynamics and function of matter. To this end, the division develops, builds and operates beamlines and experiments at the DESY light sources PETRA III and FLASH. Every year, more than 3,000 researchers – most of them from universities, but also from non-university research institutions and industry – from over 40 countries conduct experiments at the light sources and in the laboratories at DESY. The research spectrum ranges from basic research to applied research and industrial collaborations in physics, chemistry, biology, medicine, life sciences, earth sciences, materials research as well as the study of cultural heritage.

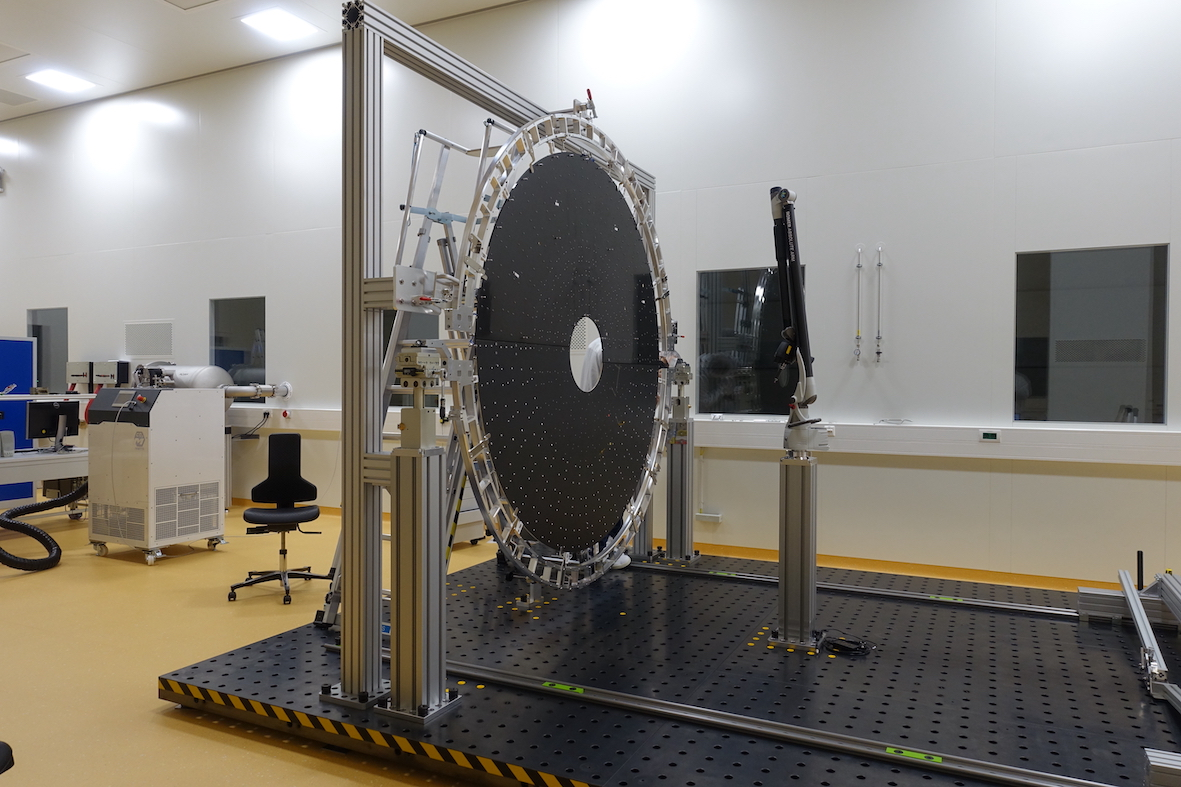
In the Detector Assembly Facility (DAF) at DESY, new, more radiation-resistant and precise silicon tracking detectors are produced for the ATLAS and CMS experiments at the LHC accelerator at CERN (here for CMS).

The Particle Physics division is involved in the large-scale experiments at the Large Hadron Collider (LHC) at CERN near Geneva. As part of the international collaborations that run the ATLAS and CMS experiments, DESY contributes to many developments at the LHC, from hardware design and data analysis to preparations for the planned upgrades. DESY also participates in the Belle II experiment at the electron–positron collider SuperKEKB at the research centre KEK in Tsukuba, Japan, as well as in developments for possible future electron–positron linear colliders. It is also active in theoretical particle physics.

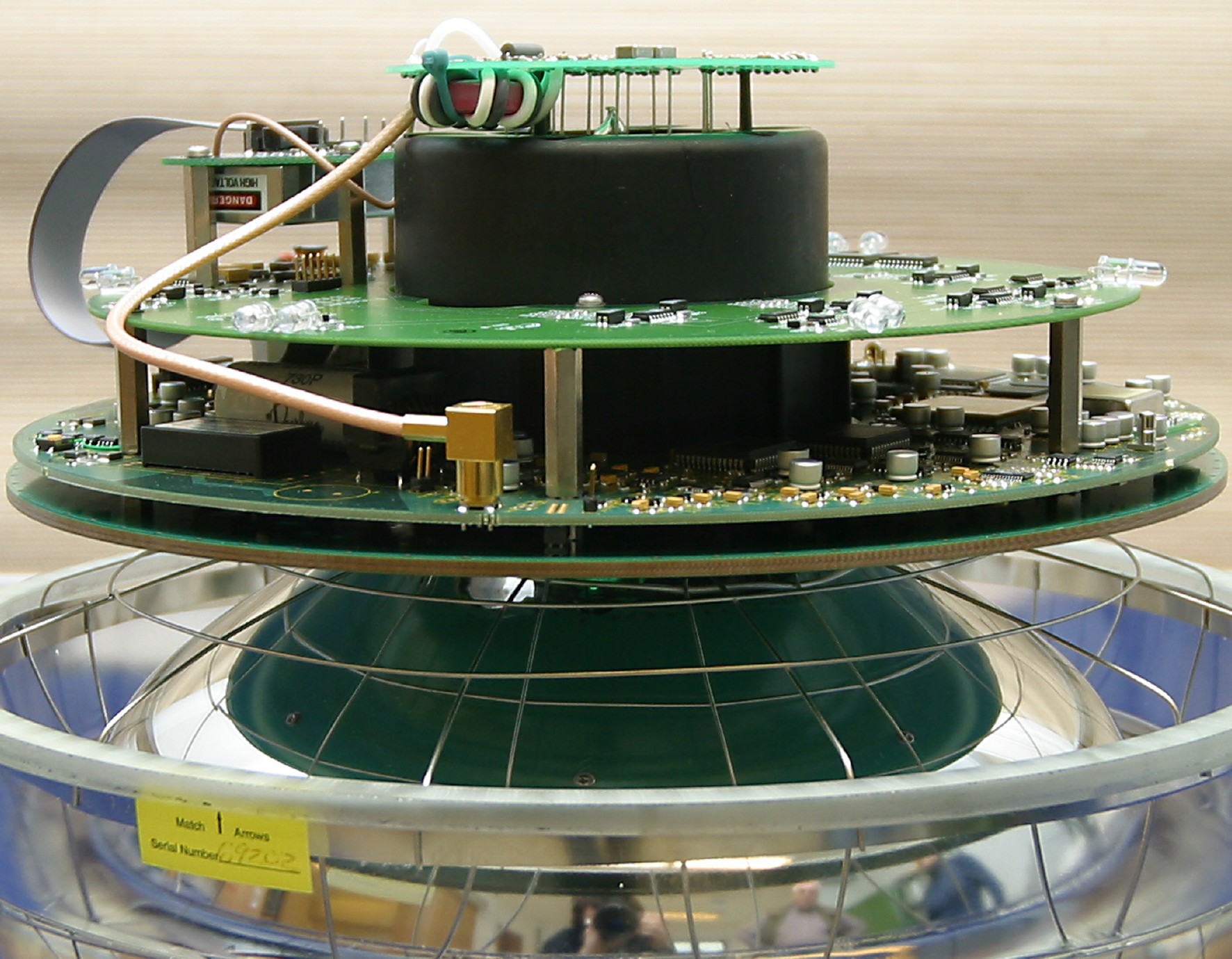
DESY produces a large part of the digital optical modules for the neutrino observatory IceCube at the South Pole.

The Astroparticle Physics division investigates high-energy processes in the universe. Detectors and telescopes are used to analyse neutrinos and gamma rays from space, which can provide information about cosmic phenomena: black holes, exploding stars and radiation bursts of extreme intensity. To this end, DESY is involved in the gamma telescopes MAGIC, H.E.S.S. and VERITAS as well as the Fermi Gamma-ray Space Telescope, and it contributes to the planned Cherenkov Telescope Array Observatory (CTAO). It is the second largest partner in the IceCube Neutrino Observatory at the South Pole.

== History ==
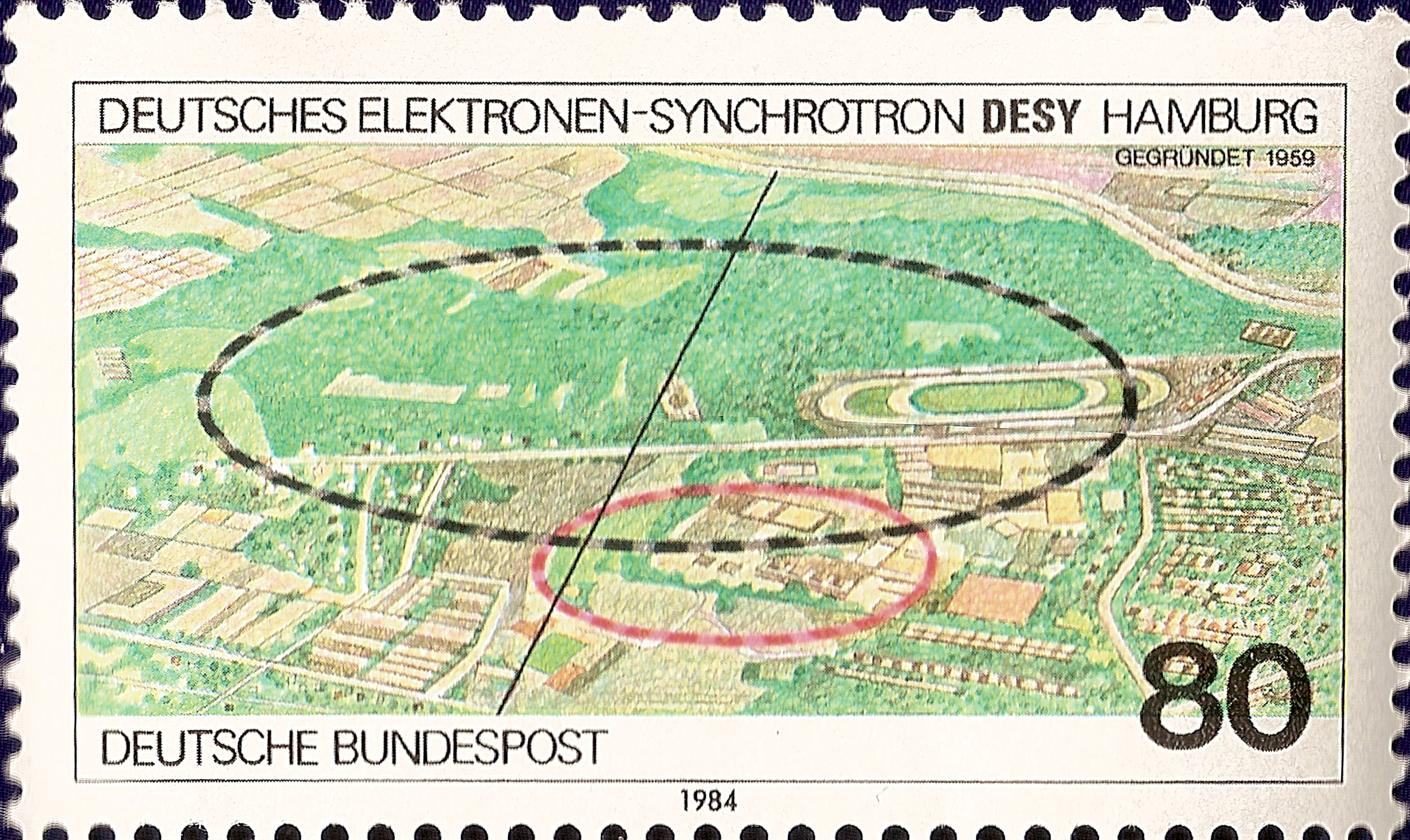
German 1984 postal stamp – 25th anniversary of the foundation of DESY

DESY was founded on 18 December 1959 in Hamburg. According to its statutes, DESY's mission is "the promotion of basic scientific research [...] in particular through the development, construction and operation of accelerators and their scientific use, in photon science and in the fields of particle and astroparticle physics, as well as through research and development work related thereto".

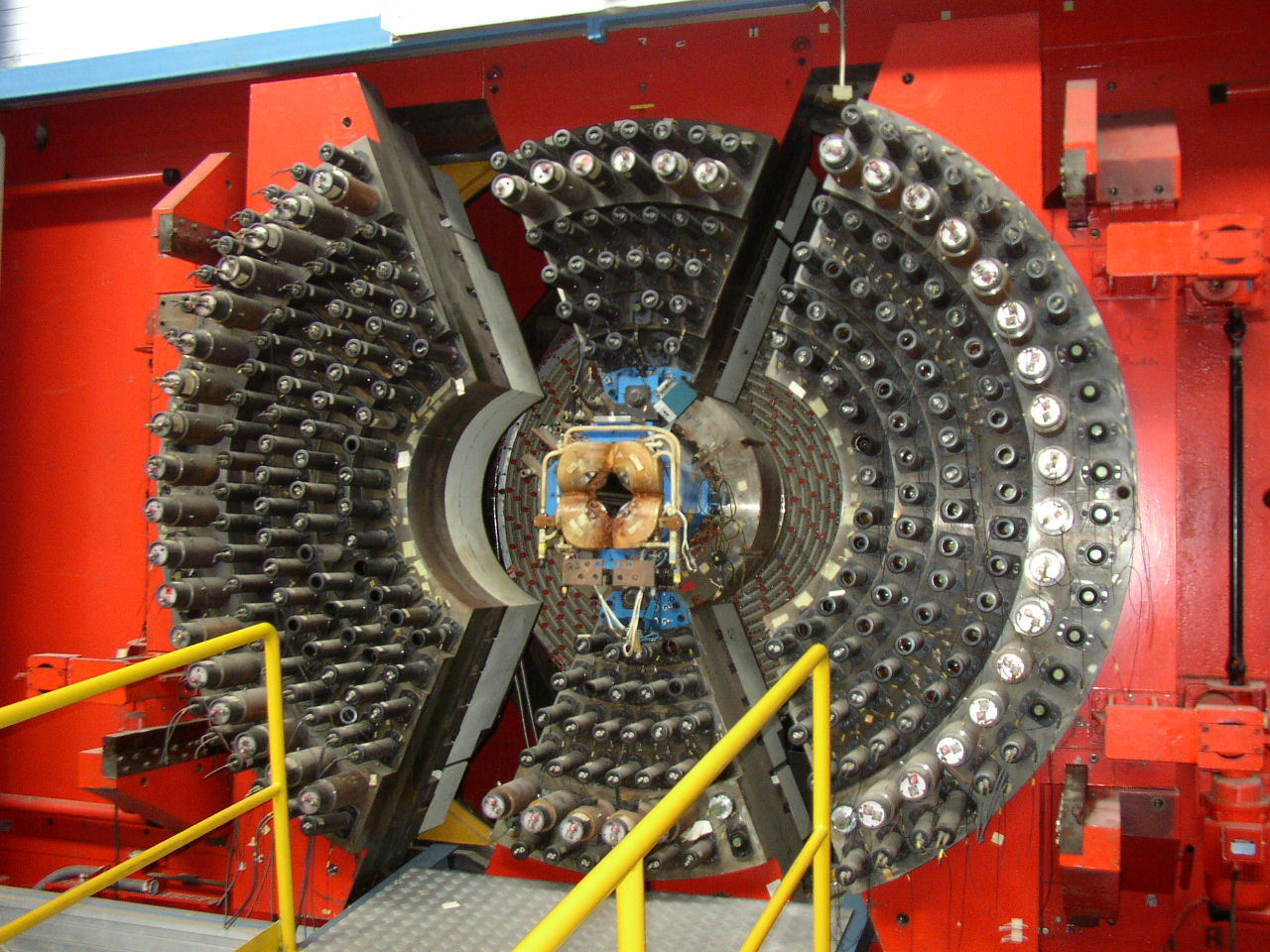
The ARGUS detector at the former electron–positron storage ring DORIS at DESY

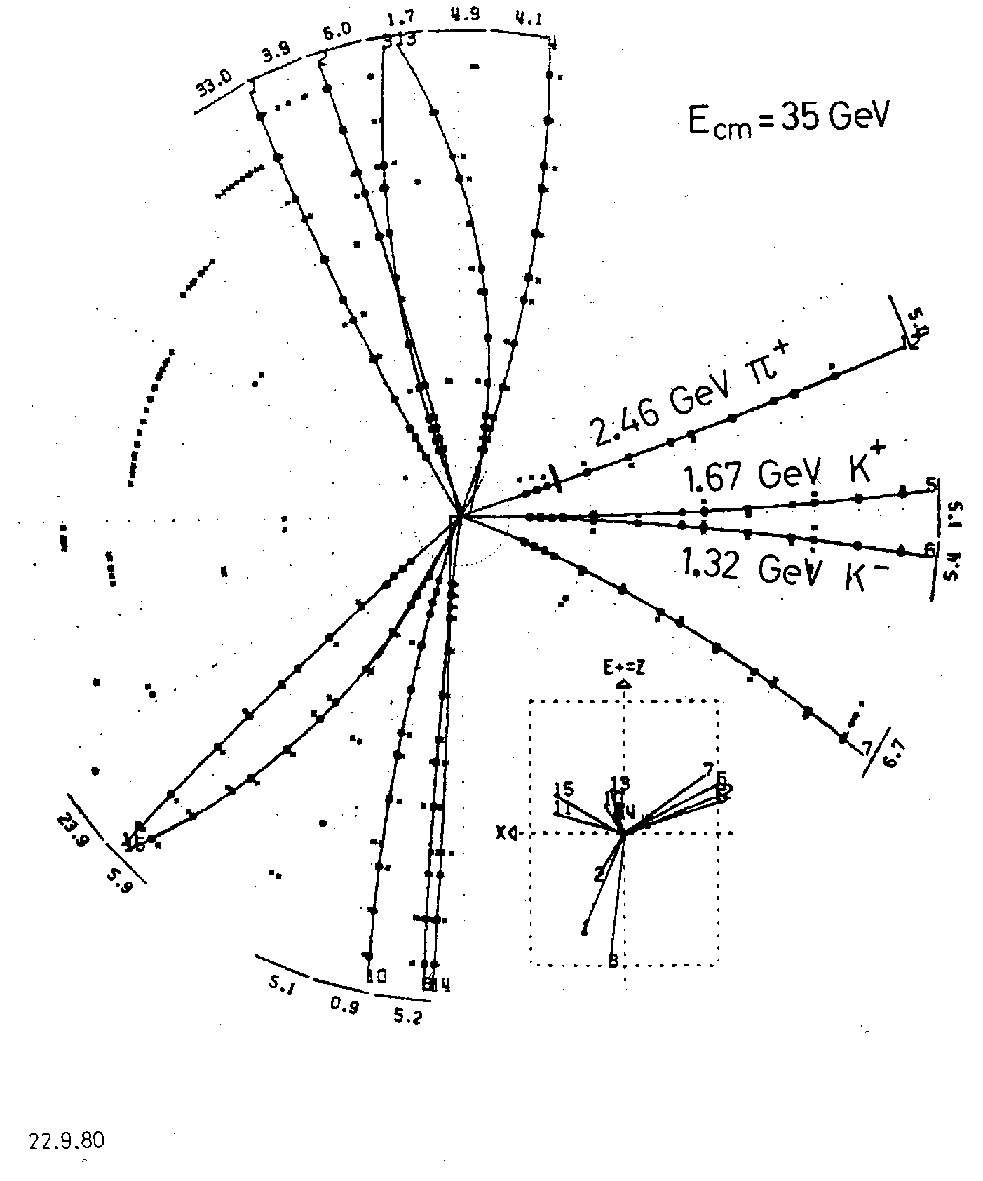
In 1979, the particle physics experiments at the electron–positron storage ring PETRA at DESY discovered the gluon, the messenger particle of the strong force.

From 1959 to 2007, the DESY accelerators were primarily used for particle physics, initially with the eponymous DESY electron synchrotron (1964–present), followed by DORIS (Double Ring Storage Facility, 1974–1992), PETRA (Positron–Electron Tandem Ring Facility, 1978–present) and HERA (Hadron–Electron Ring Accelerator, 1992–2007). In 1987, the ARGUS experiment at DORIS was the first to observe a large mixing of B mesons and thus a process in which matter and antimatter behave differently. The most important discovery of the experiments TASSO, JADE, MARK-J and PLUTO at PETRA was the detection of the gluon, the messenger particle of the strong force, in 1979. From 1990, PETRA served as a pre-accelerator for the even larger storage ring HERA with its four experiments H1, ZEUS, HERMES and HERA-B. HERA was the only storage ring facility in the world in which protons collided with electrons or positrons. In these collisions, the point-like electron acted like a probe, scanning the inner structure of the proton and making it visible with high resolution. HERA's precise insights into the interior of the proton formed the basis for numerous other particle physics experiments, especially at the Large Hadron Collider (LHC) at the research centre CERN and for numerous developments in theoretical particle physics.

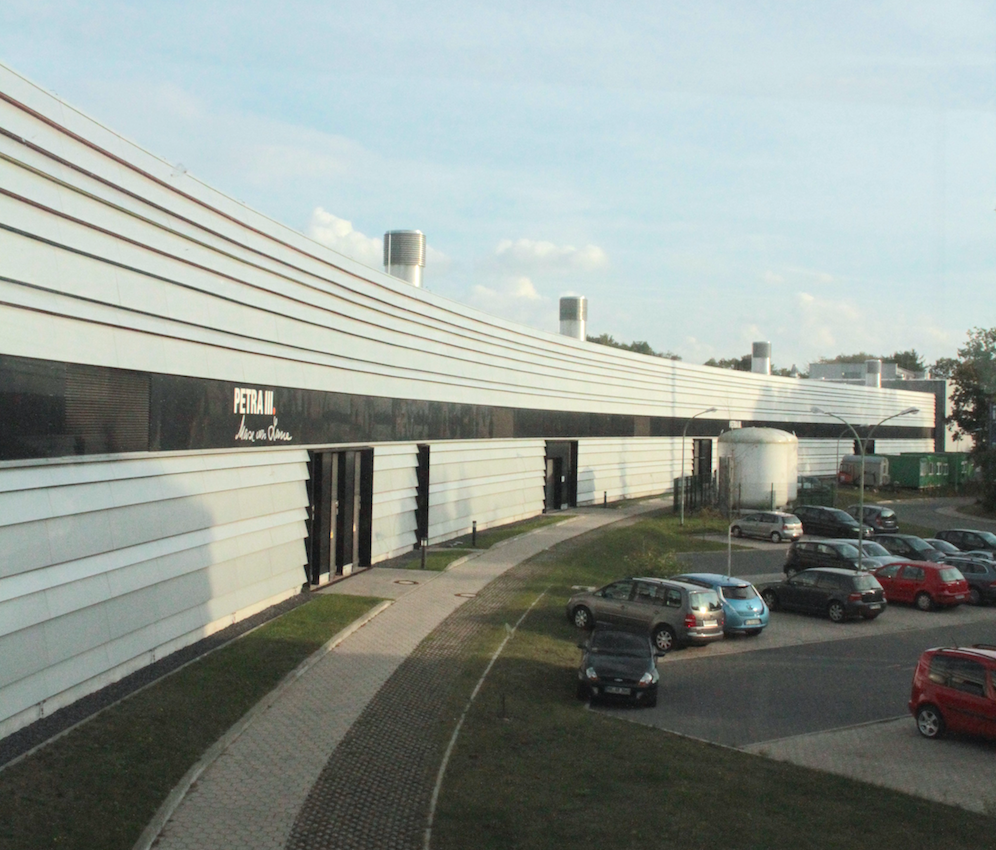
"Max von Laue" experimental hall at the synchrotron radiation source PETRA III on the DESY campus in Hamburg

In parallel, as early as the 1960s, research groups from DESY, various universities and the Max Planck Society developed the technology for using the synchrotron radiation produced by the accelerators. To meet the rapidly growing national and European demand, DESY founded its own large laboratory: the Hamburg Synchrotron Radiation Laboratory HASYLAB, which opened in 1980. It provided measuring stations at DORIS, and it was here that the Israeli biochemist Ada Yonath (Nobel Prize in Chemistry 2009) conducted experiments from 1986 to 2004 that led to her deciphering the ribosome. From 1995, both synchrotron radiation and particle physics experiments were conducted at PETRA. In 2009, the PETRA facility was upgraded for exclusive use as a synchrotron radiation source for hard X-rays (PETRA III). Today, PETRA III serves over 40 experimental stations, and there are plans to expand it into the PETRA IV 3D X-ray microscope. With the shutdown of DORIS in early 2013, the name HASYLAB was abandoned, and the use of DESY's light sources has since been carried out in its Photon Science division.

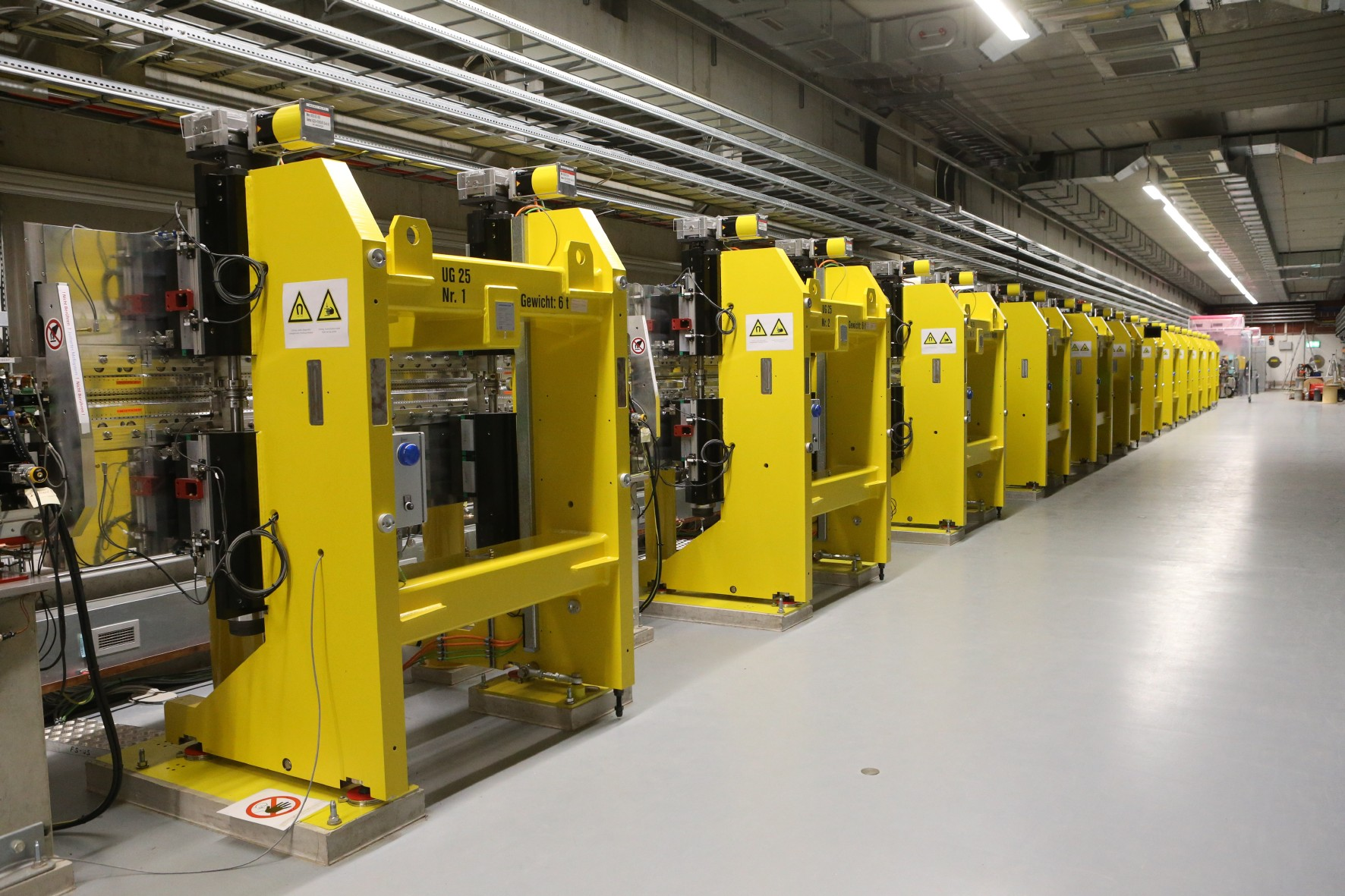
In the free-electron laser FLASH at DESY, electrons generate laser light in the soft X-ray range as they pass through special magnetic arrangements known as undulators (yellow).

In the early 1990s, DESY began to develop a new technology: radio frequency accelerator technology based on superconducting cavities made of niobium, which are cooled to approximately 2 K (−271 °C) with liquid helium. The first accelerator on this basis was a test facility for superconducting linear accelerators at DESY to test the principle of self-amplified spontaneous emission (SASE) of X-ray laser light. The SASE theory was developed and refined at DESY and at institutes in Russia, Italy and the US from 1980 onwards. In 2000 to 2001, the test facility at DESY was the first free-electron laser in the world to produce light flashes in the vacuum ultraviolet and soft X-ray range. Today, the FLASH facility produces ultrashort light pulses in the soft X-ray range for seven experimental stations. Since 2020, it has been expanded to further optimise the properties of the radiation (FLASH2020+ project).

From 2009 to 2016, an international consortium led by DESY developed the European X-ray free-electron laser European XFEL. The international research facility, which involves 12 European shareholder countries, is operated by the non-profit company European XFEL GmbH. The core of the facility is a 1.7 km superconducting linear accelerator. With an electron energy of 17.5 GeV, it is the most powerful superconducting linear accelerator in the world to date. DESY operates the accelerator on behalf of European XFEL GmbH.

Since 2010, DESY has been developing plasma-based accelerator technology (both laser- and electron-beam-driven) as a possible alternative to conventional accelerator technologies, with the aim of enabling compact accelerators for photon science, particle physics as well as medical and industrial applications.

== Chairpersons of the DESY Directorate ==
DESY is headed by a Directorate consisting of the directors of the four divisions (Accelerators, Photon Science, Particle Physics and Astroparticle Physics) and the administration as well as the delegate of the Directorate for innovation. Chairpersons of the Directorate so far have been:

- 1959 to 1970: Willibald Jentschke, Founding Director
- 1971 to 1972: Wolfgang Paul
- 1973 to 1980: Herwig Schopper
- 1981 to 1993: Volker Soergel
- 1993 to 1999: Bjørn H. Wiik
- 1999 to early 2009: Albrecht Wagner
- 2009 to March 2025: Helmut Dosch
- since 1 April 2025: Beate Heinemann

== Joint research centres ==
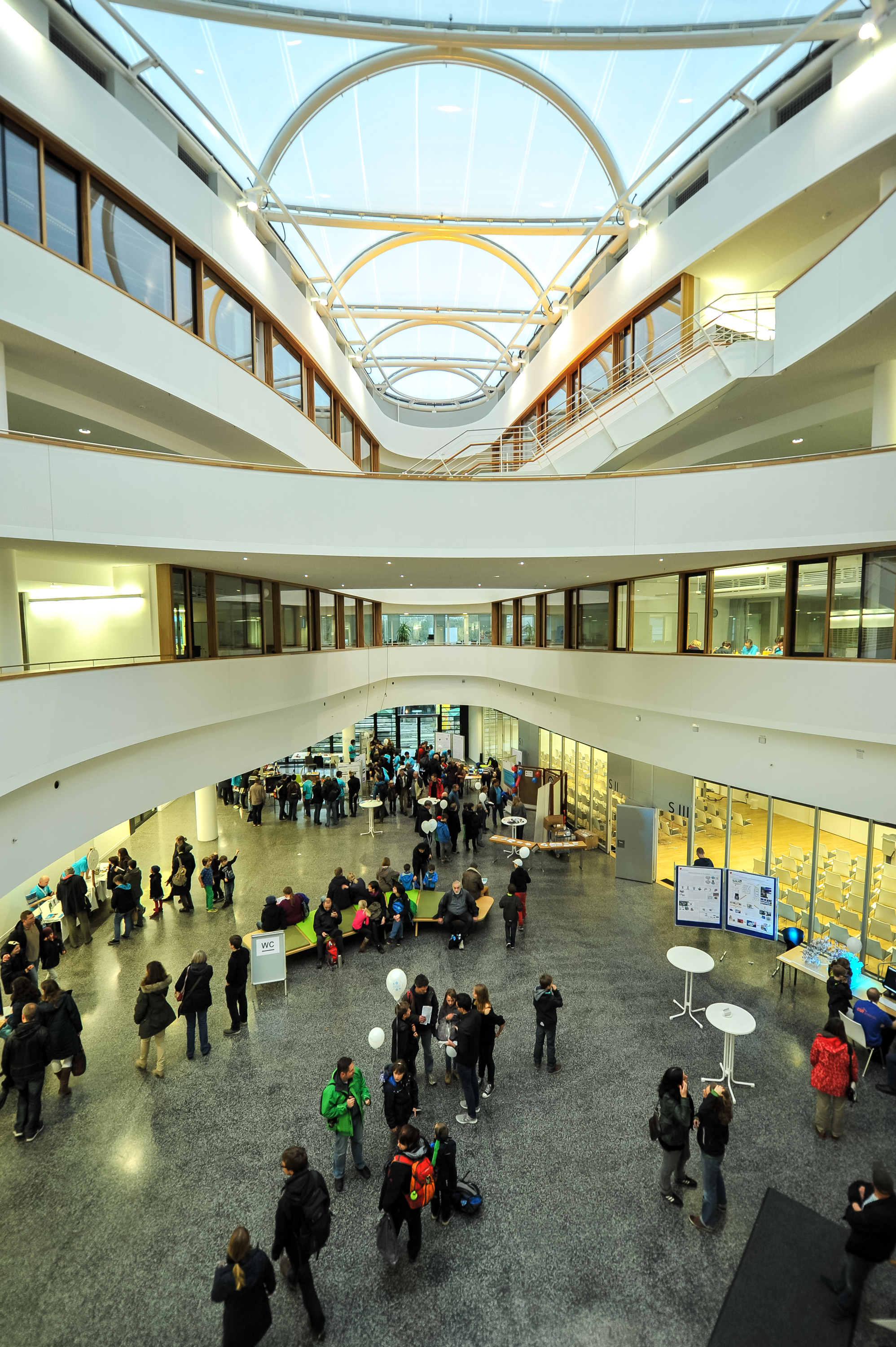
Inside the Center for Free-Electron Laser Science (CFEL) in Hamburg

The DESY campus in Hamburg is the location of several national and international centres in which DESY participates. These are:

- Center for Free-Electron Laser Science (CFEL): Investigation of ultrafast phenomena with free-electron lasers and optical lasers, studies of light–matter interaction under extreme conditions
- Centre for Structural Systems Biology (CSSB): Structural systems biology to study infection processes at the molecular level of viruses, bacteria and parasites
- Centre for X-ray and Nano Science (CXNS): Investigation of condensed matter with X-ray and complementary methods, high-resolution X-ray imaging, analysis of material processes

== Knowledge and technology transfer ==
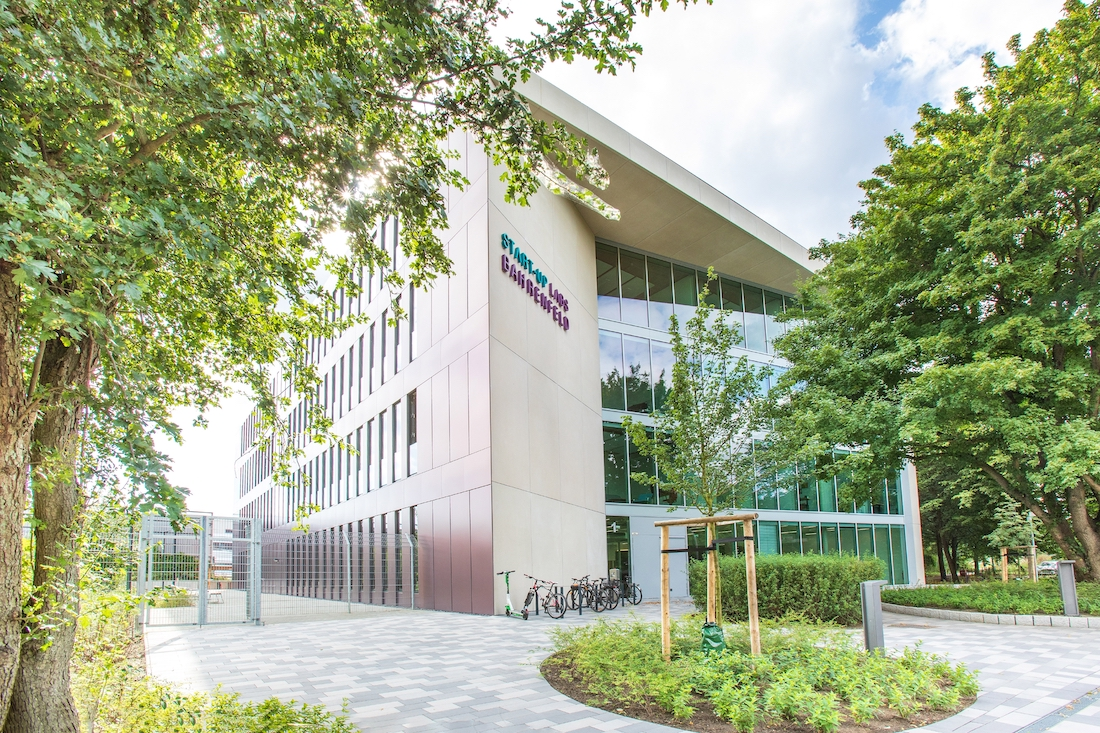
The Start-up Labs Bahrenfeld, an innovation centre of DESY, the University of Hamburg and the Free and Hanseatic City of Hamburg were opened in September 2021.

DESY aims to promote start-ups and bring know-how from fundamental research into application. It offers commercial companies support for industrial issues, e.g. through special industry access to photon sources and laboratories, develops ideas, applications and products based on fundamental research, and supports its employees in founding start-ups based on DESY technologies in the Hamburg and Brandenburg regions. DESY offers start-ups access to offices, laboratories and workshops in the DESY Innovation Village and the Start-up Labs Bahrenfeld, established together with the University of Hamburg and the Free and Hanseatic City of Hamburg.
