= Packaged metering manhole =

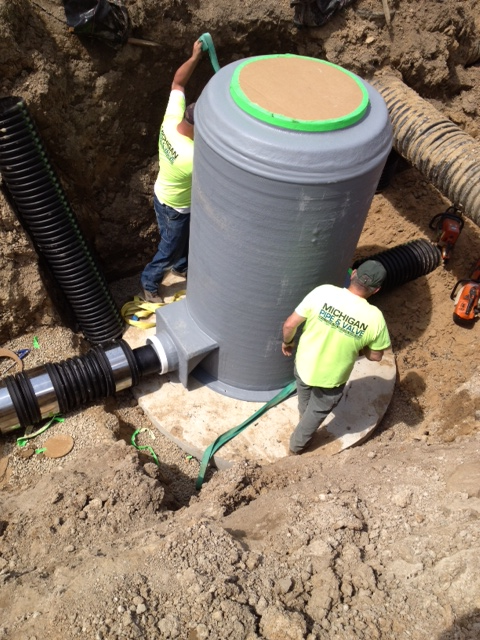
A H-20 highway loading packaged metering manhole during installation

Packaged metering manholes (PMMs) are an outgrowth of the fiberglass manholes developed in the 1960s. Packaged metering manhole factories integrate a primary device (typically a flume or weir) into a fiberglass manhole.

The result is a lightweight, single-piece (generally), corrosion resistant structure from which an operator can measure piped flows, take composite samples, and perform water quality parameter monitoring.

== Benefits ==
Manufacturers of packaged metering manholes cite the following benefits:

- Wide choice of primary device types and sizes
- Watertight (eliminating infiltration into the manhole)
- Factory integration of the primary device
- Corrosion resistance
- Lightweight construction (resulting in reduced installation labor and equipment costs)
- Reduced inspection, maintenance, and rehabilitation costs
- Single source responsibility

== Limitations ==
The nature of the construction of packaged metering manholes brings a number of limitations not commonly found with pre-cast concrete structures. These include:

- Higher initial cost
- Need for a pre-cast concrete base (for buoyancy)
- Lack of installer familiarity
- Lower sustainable operating temperatures

== Components ==
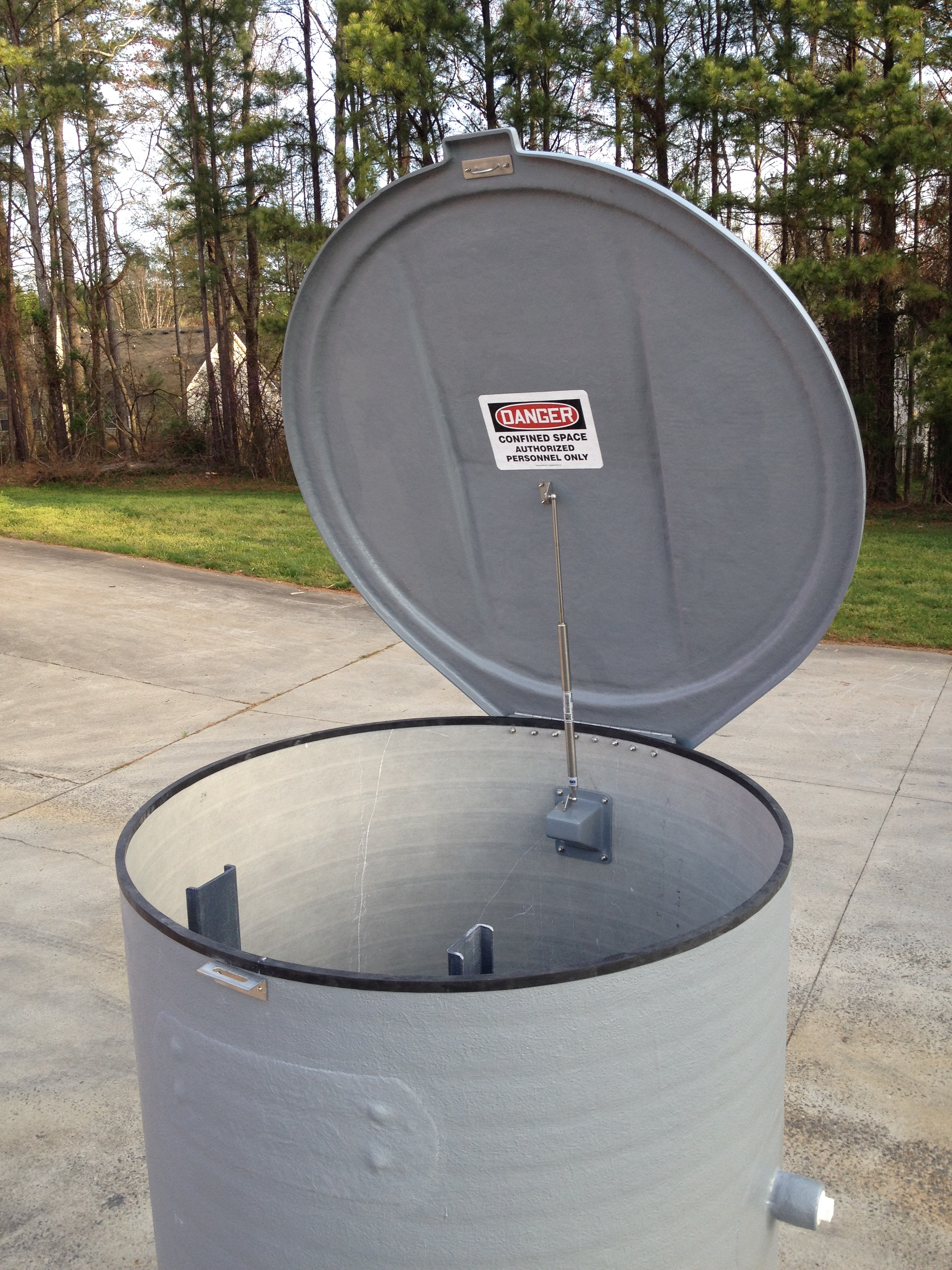
An open domed top on a fiberglass packaged metering manhole

At its simplest, a packaged metering manhole consists of:

- Fiberglass manhole barrel
- Top
- Primary device
- Integral base

=== Manhole barrel ===
The fiberglass barrels used in the production of packaged metering manholes are, almost exclusively in North America, required to meet the standards set for in ASTM D 3753: Standard Specification for Glass-Fiber-Reinforced Polyester Manholes and Wetwells. The standard defines minimum performance criteria, quality control, chemical resistance, and materials of construction.

Typical manhole barrel thickness is 3/8–1/2 inch (10–13 mm) thick. Thickness is assumed to be solid barrels only (not including any exterior ribbing). For manhole barrels with ribbing laminated to the exterior of the barrel, the barrel thickness is allowed to be thinner than otherwise would be allowed under ASTM D 3753. The typical breakpoint between solid and ribbed barrels occurs at the 72 inches (2 m) diameter. Barrels with a diameter less than this usually have solid walls, and those with a greater diameter have exterior ribbing.

=== Top ===
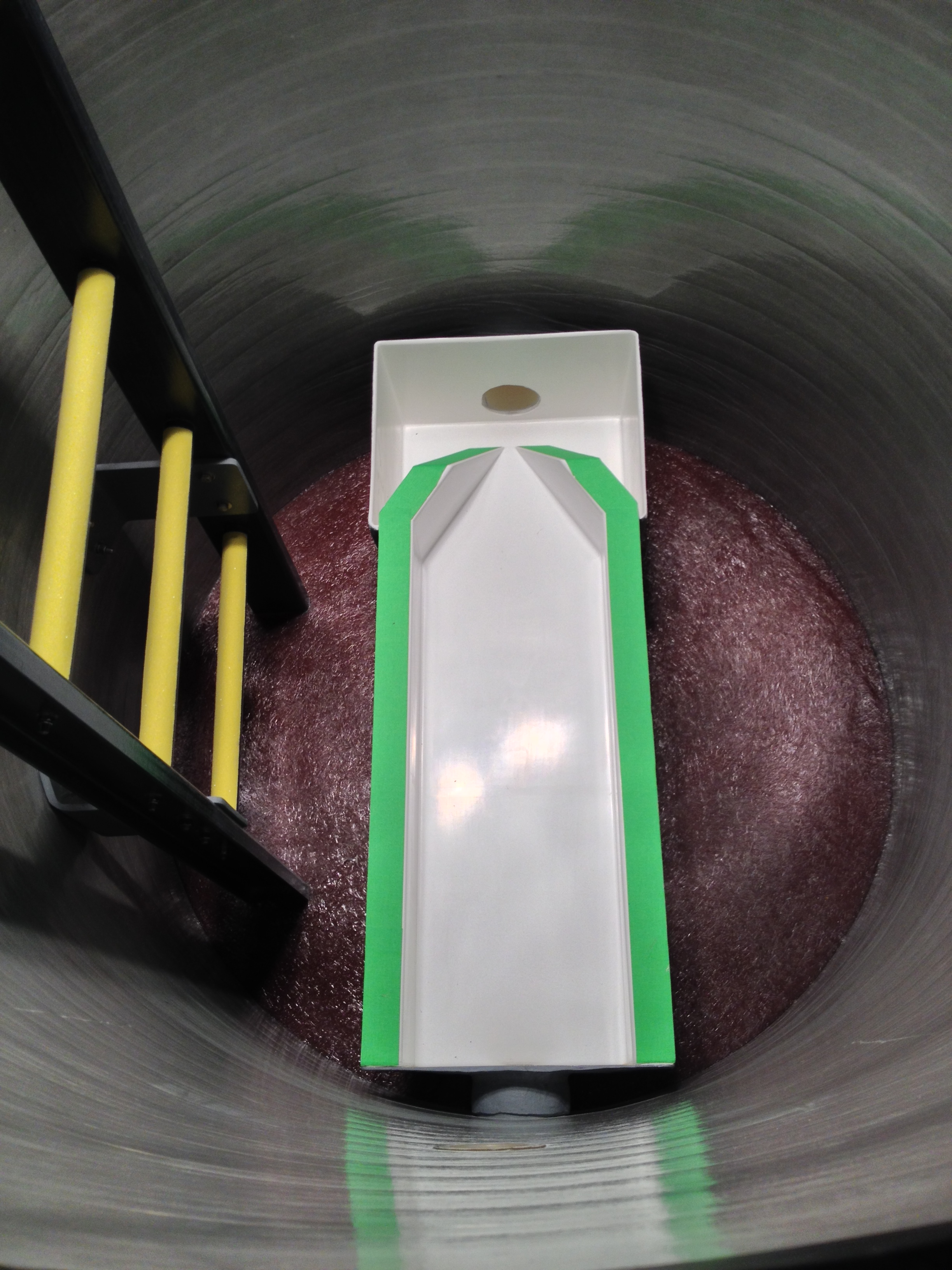
A 6-inch H flume factory mounted in a fiberglass packaged metering manhole

Since their introduction, a variety of different top styles have been developed for packaged metering manholes. The most common of these are:

- Domed fiberglass (for grassed areas with no foot or vehicle traffic)
- Pedestrian hatches (for pedestrian foot traffic)
- Traffic reducers (for parking lots, roads, etc.)

In addition to these more common styles, a variety of custom tops have been developed by various manufacturers, including open tops, grating platforms, split tops, and restricted access covers.

=== Primary device ===
When used to measure open channel flows, packaged metering manholes most commonly integrate a flume or weir (flumes being most common due to their ability to pass solids, low head loss, and wide operating ranges). Parshall flumes are most commonly integrated, followed by Palmer-Bowlus flumes, although Cutthroat, Montana, Trapezoidal, and H Type flumes can also be integrated. Weirs are less commonly integrated due to their poor solids handling characteristics as well as the inability to develop a sufficiently large upstream weir pool.

For piped flow applications, several manufacturers offer magnetic flow meters factory integrated into a packaged metering manhole structure.

=== Base ===
In order to form a watertight unit, a packaged metering manhole is provided with a solid fiberglass base at the bottom of the manhole barrel. The base can serve not only as the bottom of the manhole, but also as a means of anchoring the manhole to a concrete slab (required to counteract the buoyant forces on the manhole).

== Cost ==
For primary devices where the device (and proper transitions) can be molded into the manhole barrel, the unit cost of a precast manhole is lower than that of a packaged metering manhole (although they lack the corrosion resistance and factory water-tightness of a packaged metering manhole).

Larger primary devices (and transitions) that do not readily fit into a standard 4 ft (1.2 m) precast manhole barrel, either a larger barrel or a concrete vault must be used which adds cost. Packaged metering manholes, on the other hand, can integrate primary devices that are larger than the manhole barrel – with any portion that doesn't fit inside the manhole barrel extending upstream or downstream as necessary. Those portion that extend upstream / downstream of the barrel are manufactured with integral covers and laminated into the manhole structure. It is this ability to incorporate primary devices larger than the manhole barrel allows packaged metering manholes to be equally if not less expensive than a precast manhole or vault.

Packaged metering manholes can run from $5,195 to $29,100 (2016 USD), with the industry standard 4 foot diameter, 7 foot deep, domed top packaged metering manhole deep integrating a 3-inch Parshall flume having a cost of $10,565 (2016 USD).

== Manufacturers ==
Packaged metering manholes are most prevalent in the United States (with occasional installations in Canada and Mexico). As such, the majority of manufacturers are located there. While there are a number of resellers (manufacturer's representatives, supply companies, etc.), there are several primary manufacturers of packaged metering manholes in North America. These are OpenChannelFlow, Plasti-Fab, Inc., Tracom, and Warminster Fiberglass, Inc.

Internationally, Armatech Environmental, located in New Zealand, also manufactures packaged metering manholes for Oceania. The primary limitation to the wider distribution and use of packaged metering manholes is the high cost (relative to the product cost) of shipping the units overseas.

== See also ==
- Manhole
- Manhole cover
