= Cutthroat flume =

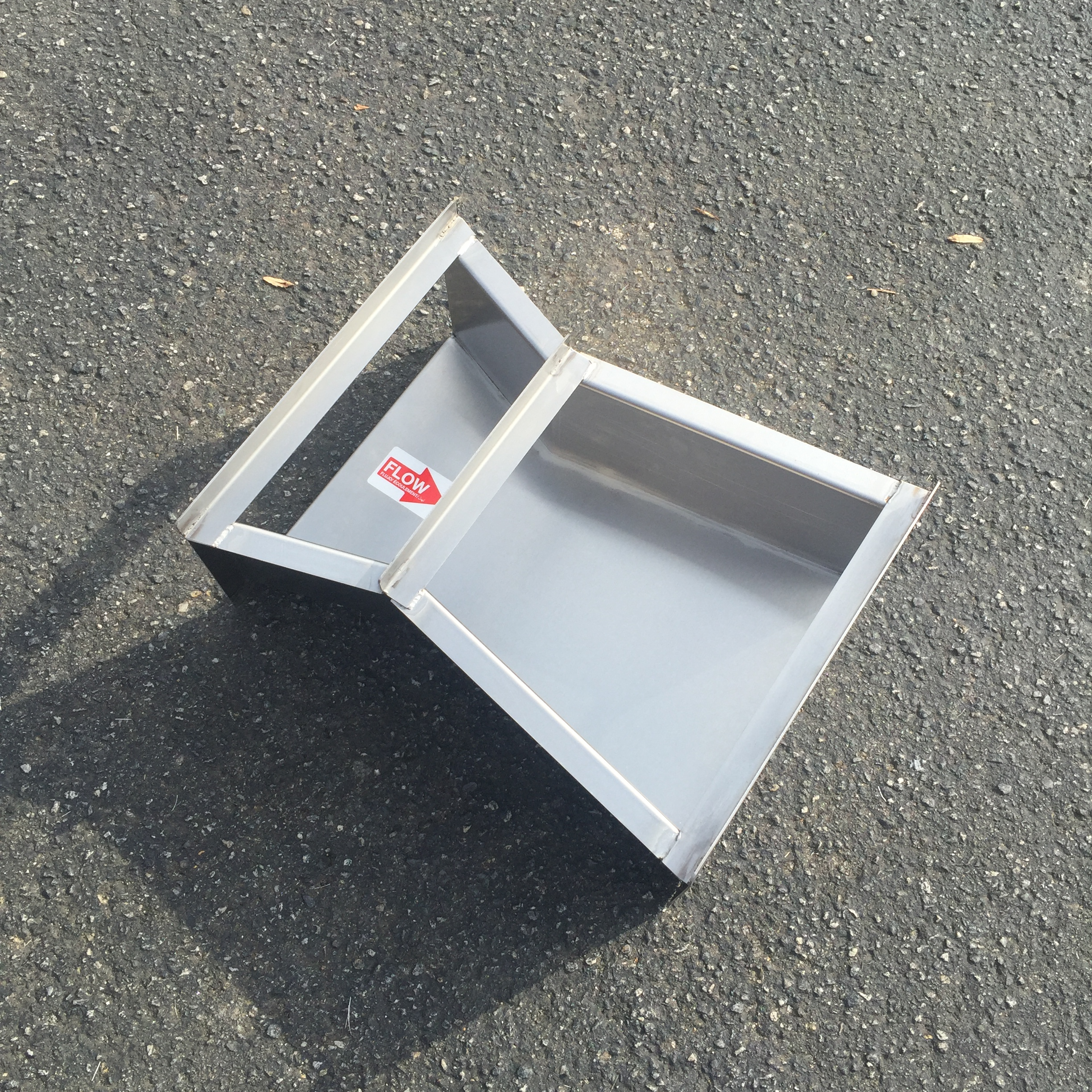
Stainless steel Cutthroat flume

The Cutthroat flume is a class of flow measurement flume developed during 1966/1967 that is used to measure the flow of surface waters, sewage flows, and industrial discharges. Like other flumes, the Cutthroat flume is a fixed hydraulic structure. Using vertical sidewalls throughout, the flume accelerates flow through a contraction of sidewalls until the flow reaches the "throat" of the flume, where the flow is then expanded. Unlike the Parshall flume, the Cutthroat flume lacks a parallel-walled throat section and maintains a flat floor throughout the flume.

The design of the Cutthroat flume is standardized but not covered by a national or international standard (unlike the Parshall flume). The flumes are not patented and the discharge tables are not copyright protected.

A total of 16 standard sizes of Cutthroat flumes have been developed, covering flow ranges from 0.3536 gpm [0.0223 L/s] to 54,801 gpm [3,458 L/s].

== Free-flow equation ==
Under free-flow conditions the depth of water at specified location upstream of the flume throat can be converted to a rate of flow.

The free-flow discharge can be summarized as

$$Q = C H^n$$
$$C = K W^{1.025}$$

Where

- Q is flow rate
- "C" is the free-flow coefficient
- K is the free-flow length coefficient for the flume
- H is the head at the primary point of measurement
- n is the free-flow exponent
- "W" is the throat width

Both “K” and “n” vary by flume length alone.

Table 1

Length	Throat Width	Coefficient (C)	Exponent (n)	Free-Flow Length Coefficient
18"	1"	0.494	2.150	6.100
18"	2"	0.974	2.150	6.100
18"	4"	1.975	2.150	6.100
18"	8"	4.030	2.150	6.100
36"	2"	0.719	1.840	4.500
36"	4"	1.459	1.840	4.500
36"	8"	2.970	1.840	4.500
36"	16"	6.040	1.840	4.500
54"	3"	0.960	1.720	3.980
54"	6"	1.960	1.720	3.980
54"	12"	3.980	1.720	3.980
54"	24"	8.010	1.720	3.980
108"	12"	3.50	1.560	3.500
108"	24"	7.11	1.560	3.500
108"	48"	14.49	1.560	3.500
108"	12"	22.0	1.560	3.500

== Submergence ==
Submergence transitions for Cutthroat flumes varies by flume length:

- 60% for 18-inches long
- 65% for 36-inches long
- 70% for 54-inches long
- 80% for 108-inches long

The submergence transition values for Cutthroat flumes are generally better than those for similarly sized Parshall flumes – an advantage in flat gradient channels where downstream hydraulics may increase the submergence ratio in the flume.

Unlike the Parshall flume, the secondary point of measurement, Hb, in the Cutthroat flume is located away from the throat section, making the determination of the level relatively easy.

== Development ==
The Cutthroat flume was developed during the 1966-67s at the Utah Water Research Laboratory, Utah State, Logan, Utah by Skogerboe, Hyatt, Anderson, and Eggleston. The result of these efforts was a flume that is simple in form and construction and that is well suited for use in flat gradient (low slope) applications.

== Design ==
Cutthroat flumes lack a parallel-wall throat section (hence the name) and has a flat-bottom to allow for installation in flat gradient channels. From the top, the Cutthroat flume has an hourglass look similar to the Parshall flume, with which it is sometimes confused.

The walls of a Cutthroat flume are vertical, like Parshall and HS / H / HL flumes. The approach section walls contract uniformly at a 3:1 ratio, while the discharge section walls expand at a 6:1 ratio. The point at with the approach and discharge section walls meet is termed the “throat” of the Cutthroat flume.

The primary point of measurement, Ha, occurs at a point upstream of the flume throat and can be determined by the equation

$$H_a = 2L / 9$$

Where L is flume length.

The secondary point of measurement, Hb, occurs at a point downstream of the flume throat and can be determined by the equation

$$H_b = 5L / 9$$

Where L is flume length.

== Advantages ==
- The simplicity of the Cutthroat flume’s geometry is such that it can be fabricated in a wide variety of materials, including concrete, galvanized steel, sheet polycarbonate, stainless steel, wood (temporary applications), or fiberglass, as the application requires.
- The geometry of the Cutthroat flume is the same among different lengths of Cutthroat flumes. The angle of contraction in the inlet section and the angle of expansion in the outlet section are the same for all Cutthroat flumes.
- As the free-flow coefficient (K) and the free-flow exponent (n) depend only upon flume length, intermediate sizes Cutthroat flumes can be developed without the need for laboratory verification.
- The flat-bottomed design means that the flume can be retrofitted into existing channels without the need to raise the flume or adjust the downstream hydraulics.
- Provided the throat width is large enough, with its flat-bottomed design, the Cutthroat flume passes sediment and debris quite easily.

== Disadvantages ==
- Difficulty in replicating the flow characteristics of the initial research has led some researchers from recommending the Cutthroat flume.
- As with weirs, flumes can also have an effect on local fauna. Some species or certain life stages of the same species may be blocked by flumes due to relatively slow swim speeds or behavioral characteristics.
- In earthen channels, upstream bypass and downstream scour may occur.
- Cutthroat flumes with throat widths below 3-inches in size should not be used on unscreened sanitary flows due to the likelihood of clogging.

== Standard sizes ==
Four standard lengths of the Cutthroat flume have been developed, with four throat widths for each length.

Below are the standard flume lengths with their respective standard throat widths.

- 18-inches
  - 1-inch, 2-inches, 4-inches, 8-inches
- 36-inches
  - 2-inches, 4-inches, 8-inches, 16-inches
- 54-inches
  - 3-inches, 6-inches, 12-inches, 24-inches
- 108-inches
  - 12-inches, 24-inches, 48-inches, 72-inches

For a given length, Cutthroat flumes of intermediate throat widths can be developed without the need for laboratory testing.

$$Q = C H^n$$
$$C = 6.585 L^{-0.3310} W^{1.025}$$
$$n = 2.0936L^{-0.1225} - 0.128 (W/L)$$

Where

- Q is flow rate
- "C" is the free-flow coefficient
- H is the head at the primary point of measurement
- n is the free-flow exponent
- "W" is the throat width
- "L" is the flume length

== Installation ==
As with the Parshall flume, the initial applications for Cutthroat flumes were envisioned to be measuring flows in irrigation channels and other surface waters.

Again, like the Parshall flume, the Cutthroat flume has proven to be applicable to a range of open channel flows including:

- Irrigation channels and ditches
- Furrows
- Surface waters (swales, creeks, streams, and rivers)
- Elevated, above grade piped flows
- Below grade piped flows (concrete vaults / manholes incorporated into Packaged Metering Manholes
