= Parshall flume =

Hydraulic structure for measuring fluid flow

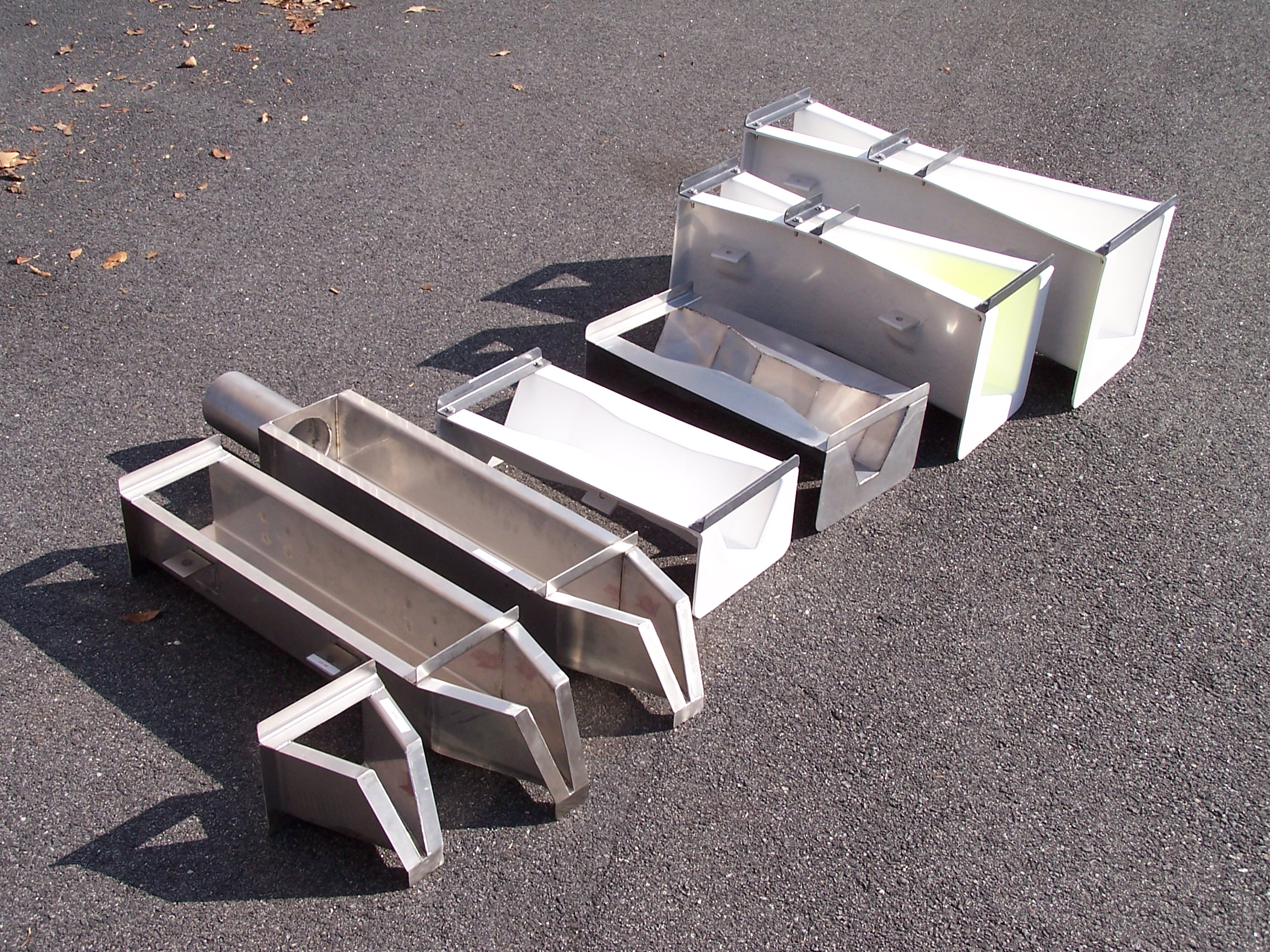
Parshall flumes (right) alongside other types of flow meters

The Parshall flume is an open channel flow-metering device that was developed to measure the flow of surface water and irrigation flow. The Parshall flume is a modified version of the Venturi flume. Named after its creator, Dr. Ralph L. Parshall of the U.S. Soil Conservation Service, the Parshall flume is a fixed hydraulic structure used in measuring volumetric flow rate in surface water, industrial discharges, municipal sewer lines, and influent/effluent flows in wastewater treatment plants. The Parshall flume accelerates the flow by contracting both the parallel sidewalls and a drop in the floor at the flume throat. Under free-flow conditions, the depth of water at a specified location upstream of the flume throat can be converted to a rate of flow. Some states specify the use of Parshall flumes, by law, for certain situations (commonly water rights). Differences between the Venturi and Parshall flume include reduction of the inlet converging angle, lengthening the throat section, reduction of the discharge divergence angle, and introducing a drop through the throat (and subsequent partial recovery in the discharge section).

== Development ==
Beginning in 1915, Dr. Ralph Parshall of the U.S. Soil Conservation Service altered the subcritical Venturi flume to include a drop in elevation through the throat of the flume. This created a transition from subcritical flow conditions to supercritical flow conditions through the throat of the flume.

Modifications to the Venturi flume that Parshall made include:

- Decreasing the angle of convergence of the inlet walls
- Lengthening the throat
- Decreasing the angle of divergence of the outlet wall
- Introducing a drop through the throat of the flume

In 1930, the improved flume was named the Parshall Measuring Flume by the Irrigation Committee of the American Society of Civil Engineers (ASCE) in recognition of Parshall's accomplishments. Parshall was additionally honored as a Life Member of the ASCE.

== Applications ==
Dr. Parshall's initial focus was on the use of his namesake flume to measure flows in irrigation channels and other surface waters. Over time, however, the Parshall flume has proven to be applicable to a wide variety of open channel flows including:

- Irrigation channels and ditches
- Furrows
- Surface waters (swales, creeks, streams, and rivers)
- Elevated, above grade piped flows
- Below grade piped flows (concrete vaults/manholes incorporated into Packaged Metering Manholes)

== Construction ==
A wide variety of materials are used to make Parshall flumes, including:

- Fiberglass (wastewater applications due to its corrosion resistance)
- Stainless steel (applications involving high temperatures / corrosive flow streams)
- Galvanized steel (water rights / irrigation)
- Concrete (large Parshall throat widths 144 in [3.7 m] and above)
- Aluminum (portable applications)
- Wood (temporary flow measurement)
- Plastic (PVC or polycarbonate / Lexan) (teaching/laboratory investigation)

Smaller Parshall flumes tend to be fabricated from fiberglass and galvanized steel (depending upon the application), while larger Parshall flumes tend to be fabricated from fiberglass (sizes up to 144 in) or concrete (160–600 in).

By the 1960s, several different companies began to commercially offer Parshall flumes. These manufacturers have typically produced flumes from one type of material only (typically glass-reinforce plastic or steel), although currently a few, offer Parshall flumes in a variety of materials. When used for stream gauging, aluminium is the typical material of construction - primarily due to its light weight.

An example can be found via google earth: 50°58'41.34"N, 5°51'36.81"E, eye altitude 200 m. This is in the Geleenbeek, near Geleen in the Netherlands.

== Technical details ==
Animation of a Parshall flume

The design of the Parshall flume is standardized under ASTM D1941, ISO 9826:1992, and JIS B7553-1993. The flumes are not patented, and the discharge tables are not copyright protected.

Parshall flumes come in twenty-two standard sizes, spanning flow ranges from 0.005 to 3,280 cubic feet per second (0.142 to 92,900 litres per second).

Submergence transitions for Parshall flumes range from 50% (1–3-inch sizes) to 80% (10–50-foot sizes), beyond which point level measurements must be taken at both the primary and secondary points of measurement, and a submergence correction must be applied to the flow equations. The secondary point of measurement (Hb) for a Parshall flume is located in the throat, measuring Hb can be difficult as flow in the throat of the flume is turbulent and prone to fluctuations in the water level. Typically, 90% is viewed as the upper limit for which corrections for submerged flow are practical.

Under laboratory conditions, Parshall flumes can be expected to exhibit accuracies to within ±2%, although field conditions make accuracies better than 5% doubtful.

The free-flow discharge can be summarized in this equation:

$$Q = C H^n$$

Where:

- Q is flowing rate
- C is the free-flow coefficient for the flume
- H is the head at the primary point of measurement
- n varies with flume size (e.g. 1.55 for a 1-inch flume)

When the downstream depth is high enough that the transition to subcritical flow advances upstream into the throat and the hydraulic jump disappears, the flume is operating in a "submerged flow" regime, and the discharge is instead given by the function

$$Q = C H^n - Q_E$$

Where $Q_E$ is the "submergence correction" and is found using pre-determined tables for a particular flume geometry.

=== Function ===
The Parshall Flume acts essentially as a constriction, a downward step, and then an expansion: the upstream section is uniformly convergent and flat, the throat is a short parallel section that slopes downward, and the downstream section is uniformly diverging and slopes upward to an ending elevation that is less than the upstream starting elevation. The width of the throat determines the flume size; 22 standardized sizes have been developed, ranging from 1 in to 50 ft (0.005 ft^{3}/s to 3,280 ft^{3}/s).

A venturi flume is similar to the Parshall flume, without the contoured base, but the cross section is usually rectangular, the inlet shorter, and there is a general taper on the outlet similar to the venturi meter. Because of their size, it is usual for these meters to be open to their surroundings just like a river or stream and therefore this type of measurement is referred to as open-channel flow measurement. Parshall flumes are much more efficient than standard flumes and generate a standard wave to affect a measurement.

There are two conditions of flow that can occur in a Parshall flume: free flow and submerged flow. When free flow conditions exist, the user only needs to collect one head measurement (Ha, the primary point of measurement) to determine the discharge. For submerged flow, a secondary head measurement (Hb) is required to determine the flume is submerged and the degree of submergence.

The primary point of measurement (Ha) is located in the inlet of the flume, two-thirds of the length of the converging section from the flume crest. The secondary point of measurement (Hb) is located in the throat of the flume. A hydraulic jump occurs downstream of the flume for free flow conditions. As the flume becomes submerged, the hydraulic jump diminishes and ultimately disappears as the downstream conditions increasingly restrict the flow out of the flume.

Not all Parshall flumes have the energy-recovering divergence section. These flumes, called Montana flumes, or short-section Parshall flumes, must instead have a free-spilling discharge at all expected flow rates, which increases the drop along the whole flume system. The measurement calculations are the same as for free flow in a standard Parshall flume, but submerged flow cannot be adjusted for.

=== Derivation ===
A Parshall Flume relies on the conservation of energy principle. The sum of the kinetic and potential energy at a given point must be equal to the energy at any other point along the stream. The total energy or head must be equal.

Using the equations, we will solve for Q.

$$E = y + \frac{q^2}{2gy^2}$$
$$q = \frac{Q}{b}$$
$$E_1 + \Delta z = E_2 + \Delta z = E_3$$

Where E_{1} is the energy at H_{a}, E_{2} at the flume crest, and E_{3} at H_{b} respectively.

Since E_{2} is located at the flume crest where there is a steep drop, critical flow conditions occur.

$$E_c = \frac{3}{2}\left(\frac{q^2}{g}\right)^\frac{1}{3} = \frac{3}{2}y_c$$

Rearranging and substituting in the above equations, we get

$$y_1 + \frac{\left(\frac{Q}{b_1}\right)^2}{2gy_1^2} = \frac{3}{2}y_c$$

Or

$$\frac{2}{3}\left(y_1 + \frac{\left(\frac{Q}{b_1}\right)^2}{2gy_1^2}\right) = y_c$$

Since that Q = v⋅y⋅b and v = √gy_{c} at critical depth, these relationships to solve for the discharge can be used.

$$Q = b_2 \sqrt{g} \left(\frac{2}{3} \left(y_1 + \frac{\left(\frac{Q}{b_1}\right)^2}{2gy_1^2}\right)\right)^\frac{3}{2}$$

Broken further down, realizing that

$$\frac{\left(\frac{Q}{b_1}\right)^2}{2gy_1^2} = \frac{v^2}{2g}$$

And

$$E_1 = y_1 + \frac{v^2}{2g}$$

Since this is measured upstream, where flow is sub-critical, it can be stated that y_{1} ≫ v^{2}/2g

Therefore, for a rough approximation;

$$Q \approx b_2 \sqrt{g} \left(\frac{2}{3} y_1\right)^\frac{3}{2}$$

This equation simplifies to:

- In ft^{3}/s: $Q \approx 3.088(b_2)y^{1.5}$
- In m^{3}/s: $Q \approx 1.704(b_2)y^{1.5}$

These final two equations are very similar to the Q = CH_{a}^{n} equations that are used for Parshall flumes. In fact, when looking at the flume tables, n has a value equal to or slightly greater than 1.5, while the value of C is larger than (3.088 b_{2}) but still in a rough estimation. The derived equations above will always underestimate actual flow since both the derived C and n values are lower than their respective chart values.

For the Parshall flume equation used to calculate the flow rate, both empirical values C and n are known constants (with various values for each Parshall flume size) leaving Ha (depth upstream) as the only variable needing to be measured. Likewise, in the energy conservation equation, y_{1} (or the depth of flow) is needed.

=== Free vs. submerged flow ===
Diagram of a Parshall flume showing free flow and submerged flow operation (with optional inlet / outlet wing walls and stilling wells)

Free flow occurs when there is no “backwater” to restrict flow through a flume. Only the upstream depth needs to be measured to calculate the flow rate. A free flow also induces a hydraulic jump downstream of the flume.

Submerged flow occurs when the water surface downstream of the flume is high enough to restrict flow through a flume, submerged flume conditions exist. A backwater buildup effect occurs in a submerged flume. For a flow calculation, a depth measurement both upstream and downstream is needed.

Although commonly thought of as occurring at higher flow rates, submerged flow can exist at any flow level as it is a function of downstream conditions. In natural stream applications, submerged flow is frequently the result of vegetative growth on the downstream channel banks, sedimentation, or subsidence of the flume.

=== Parshall flume discharge values ===
For free flow, the equation to determine the flow rate is simply Q = CH_{a}^{n} where:

- Q is flowing rate (ft^{3}/s) or (m^{3}/s)
- C is the free-flow coefficient for the flume (see Table 1 below)
- H_{a} is the head at the primary point of measurement (ft) or (m)

(See Figure 1 above)

- n varies with flume size (see Table 1 below)

Parshall flume discharge table for free flow conditions:

Table 1
Imperial System			International System		
Throat width	Coefficient (C)	Exponent (n)	Throat width (m)	Coefficient (C)	Exponent (n)
1 in	0.338	1.55	0.025	1.89	1.55
2 in	0.676	1.55	0.051	3.79	1.55
3 in	0.992	1.55	0.076	5.56	1.55
6 in	2.06	1.58	0.152	11.13	1.58
9 in	3.07	1.53	0.229	17.61	1.53
1 ft	3.95	1.55	0.305	22.12	1.55
1.5 ft	6.00	1.54	0.457	34.00	1.54
2 ft	8.00	1.55	0.610	44.80	1.55
3 ft	12.00	1.57	0.914	65.62	1.57
4 ft	16.00	1.58	1.219	86.46	1.58
5 ft	20.00	1.59	1.524	106.80	1.59
6 ft	24.00	1.59	1.829	128.16	1.59
7 ft	28.00	1.60	2.134	147.75	1.60
8 ft	32.00	1.61	2.438	166.87	1.61
10 ft	39.38	1.60	3.048	207.80	1.60
12 ft	46.75	1.60	3.658	246.70	1.60
15 ft	57.81	1.60	4.572	305.06	1.60
20 ft	76.25	1.60	6.096	402.36	1.60
25 ft	94.69	1.60	7.620	499.67	1.60
30 ft	113.13	1.60	9.144	596.98	1.60
40 ft	150.00	1.60	12.192	791.54	1.60
50 ft	186.88	1.60	15.240	986.15	1.60

For submerged flow, a depth of flow needs to be taken upstream (H_{a}) and downstream (H_{b}). See locations of H_{a} and H_{b} in Figure 1.

Flume size	S_{t}
1–3 in	0.5
6–9 in	0.6
1–8 ft	0.7
10–50 ft	0.8

If H_{b}/H_{a} is greater or equal to S_{t} then it is a submerged flow. If there is submerged flow, adjustments need to be made in order for the Parshall Flume to work properly.

The discharge (Q) can be found using the following equations and table:

- Q_{net} = Q_{free flow} – Q_{correction}
- Q_{correction} = M (0.000132 H_{a}^{2.123} e^{9.284 St)}

where:

- S, H_{b}/H_{a}
- M, multiplying factor

(Note: All various Q values are in ft^{3}/s, Ha is in feet, and M varies in units)

Table 3
Size of flume, Ft	Multiplying factor, M
1	1
1.5	1.4
2	1.8
3	2.4
4	3.1
5	3.7
6	4.3
7	4.9
8	5.4

=== Example ===
Parshall flume free flow example problem:

Using the Parshall flume free flow equation, determine the discharge of a 72-inch flume with a depth, Ha of 3 feet.

From Table 1: Throat width = 72 in = 6 ft, C = 24, and n = 1.59.

Q = 24 Ha^{1.59} for a 72-inch Parshall flume

So, if there is a depth of 3 feet, the flow rate is ≈ 140 ft^{3}/s

Approximate the discharge using the derived discharge equation shown above (Equation 5). This equation was derived using the principles of specific energy and is only to serve as an estimate for the actual discharge of the Parshall flume. Again, equations 5 and 6 will always underestimate the actual flow since both the derived C and n values are lower than their respective empirically derived chart values.

Q = (6 ft) × (3.088) × (3 ft) × 1.5 = 96 ft^{3}/s

Parshall flume submerged flow example problem:

Using the Parshall flume flow equations and Tables 1–3, determine the flow type (free flow or submerged flow) and discharge for a 36-inch flume with an upstream depth, Ha of 1.5 ft and a downstream depth, H_{b} of 1.4 ft. For reference of locations H_{a} and H_{b}, refer to Figure 1.

From Table 2, the Parshall flume submergence transition (St) for a 36-inch = 3 feet flume is 0.7. Since H_{b}/H_{a} is greater than or equal to 0.7, it is a submerged flow.

Q_{net} = Q_{free flow} – Q_{correction}
Q = CH_{a}^{n}

From Table 1: Throat width = 36 in = 3 ft, C = 12, and n = 1.57.

Q_{free flow} = 12 × (1.5 ft) × 1.57 = 22.68 ft^{3}/s
Q_{correction} = M × 0.000132 × Ha × 2.123×10^{9.284} × S

Where S = H_{b}/H_{a} = 1.4 ft/1.5 ft = 0.93

From Table 3, M = 2.4 for a flume size of 3 ft

Q_{correction} = 2.4 × (0.000132) × (1.5 ft) × (2.123×10^{9.284}) × (0.93) = 4.21 ft^{3}/s
Q_{net} = 22.68 ft^{3}/s – 4.21 ft^{3}/s = 18.5 ft^{3}/s

=== Standards ===
- ASTM D1941 – 91(2013) Standard Test Method for Open Channel Flow Measurement of Water with the Parshall Flume
- ISO 9826:1992 Measurement of Liquid Flow in Open Channels – Parshall and SANIIRI Flumes
- ANSI JIS B7553-1993 Parshall flume type flowmeters

=== Free flow E-Y diagram depiction ===
An illustration exists of a unitless E – Y diagram and how Energy and depth of flow change throughout a Parshall Flume. The two blue lines represent the q values, q_{1} for the flow before the constriction, and q_{2} representing the value at the constriction (q = Q/b = ft^{2}/s, or flow over width in a rectangular channel). When a constriction (decrease in width) happens Between E_{1} and E_{2}, the q value changes (and becomes the new critical depth), while the energy remains the same. Then the flume experiences a downward step which results in a gain in energy. This gain in energy is equal to the size of the step (or Δz). From this, the principles of conservation of energy are used to develop a set of calculations to predict the flow rate.

== Drawbacks ==
- Parshall flumes require a drop in elevation through the flume. To accommodate the drop in an existing channel either the flume must be raised above the channel floor (raising the upstream water level) or the downstream channel must be modified.
- As with weirs, flumes can also have an effect on local fauna. Some species or certain life stages of the same species may be blocked by flumes due to relatively slow swim speeds or behavioral characteristics.
- In earthen channels, upstream bypass and downstream scour may occur. Armoring of the upstream and downstream channels is recommended.
- Parshall flumes below 3 inches in size should not be used on unscreened sanitary flows, due to the likelihood of clogging.
- The Parshall flume is an empirical device. Interpolation between sizes is not an accurate method of developing intermediate size Parshall flumes as the flumes are not scale models of each other. The 30-and-42-inch (76 and 107 cm) sizes are examples of intermediate sizes of Parshall flumes that have crept into the marketplace without the backing of published research into their sizing and flow rates.

== Variations ==
Two variations of the Parshall flume have been developed over time: the Montana flume and the Short Section (USGS / Portable) Parshall flume.

=== Montana flume ===
The Montana flume omits the throat and discharge sections of the Parshall. By omitting these sections, the flume is shortened by more than half while retaining the free-flow characteristics of the same-size Parshall. With the deletion of the throat and discharge section, the Montana flume has little resistance to submersion and, like the H flume, should be used where free-spilling discharge is present under all flow conditions. The Montana flume is described in US Bureau of Reclamation's Water Measurement Manual and two technical standards MT199127AG and MT199128AG by Montana State University (note that Montana State University has currently withdrawn both standards for updating/review).

=== Short-section (USGS portable) Parshall flume ===
The short-section Parshall (sometimes referred to as a USGS or portable Parshall) omits the discharge section of the flume. Originally designed by Troxell and Taylor in 1931 and published under "Venturi Flume" as a memorandum from the office of the Ground Water Branch, USGS, the design was again brought to the attention of potential users in Taylors' paper "Portable Venturi Flume for Measuring Small Flows in 1954. This modification - supplied by the USGS Hydrologic Instrumentation Facility - is available in two sizes: the original 3" and the recently added 6".

Kilpatrick notes that the discharge for this modification of the Parshall flume is slightly greater than for a standard Parshall flume of the same size. This has been attributed to potential manufacturing tolerance variations rather than the actual operation of the flume itself and users are cautioned to verify the flume's dimensions before proceeding with data collection. As with any Parshall flume, flumes varying from the standard dimensions flumes should be individually rated.
