= Palmer-Bowlus Flume =

Class of flumes

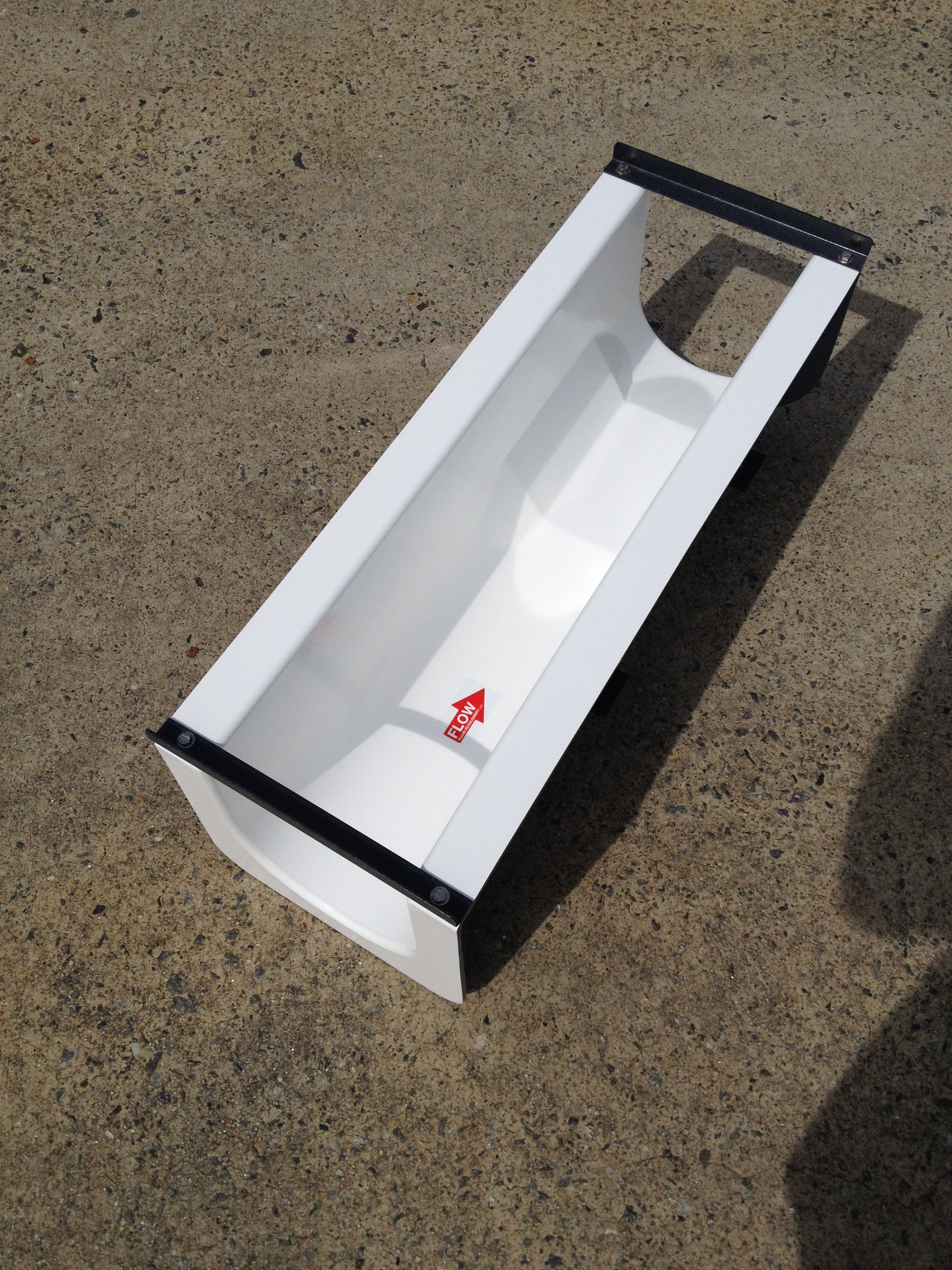
Fiberglass 8-inch Palmer-Bowlus flume

The Palmer-Bowlus flume, is a class of flumes commonly used to measure the flow of wastewater in sewer pipes and conduits. The Palmer-Bowlus flume has a u-shaped cross-section and was designed to be inserted into, or in line with, pipes and u-channels found in sanitary sewer applications.

As a long-throated flume, the point of measurement of the Palmer-Bowlus flume is anywhere upstream of the throat ramp greater than D/2 (D=flume size). Montana flume has a single, specified point of measurement in the contracting section at which the level is measured. Unlike most other flumes used for open channel flow measurement, the Palmer-Bowlus flume can be calibrated by theoretical analysis.

The general design of the flume detailed in ASTM D5390: Standard Test Method for Open-Channel Flow Measurement of Water with Palmer-Bowlus Flumes. Unlike the Parshall flume, the standard for the flume does not set out specific sizes and flow rates, but only general characteristics for the class of flume.

18 sizes of Palmer-Bowlus flumes have been developed - in line with the common pipe sizes to which they would be adapted - from 4-inches to 72-inches. In practice, though, it is uncommon to see Palmer-Bowlus flumes greater than 24-inches in size.

Under average flow conditions, the Palmer-Bowlus flume is accurate to within 3-5%. For lower flow rates - where the depth is low relative to the length of the flume - the accuracy decreases to 5-6%. This error, combined with typical installation / flow meter errors, means that overall site accuracy is somewhat less than other more common flumes.

== Free-Flow Characteristics ==
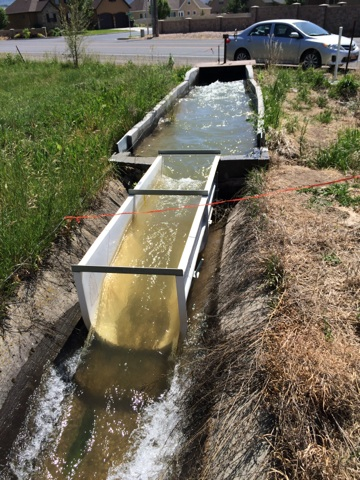
Palmer-Bowlus flume measuring irrigation flows

Flow in the Palmer-Bowlus Flume transitions from a circular bottom section to a raised trapezoidal throat and then back - accelerating sub-critical flow (Fr~0.5) to a supercritical state (Fr>1) to develop the level-to-flow relationship.

The simplified free-flow discharge can be summarized as

$$Q = C H_a^n$$

Where

- Q is flow rate
- C is the free-flow coefficient for the flume
- H_{a} is the head at the primary point of measurement
- n varies with flume size (See Table 1 below)

Note that Palmer-Bowlus flumes are proprietary to each manufacturer / throat configuration. The table presented below is for the most common throat configuration - a trapezoidal ramp - and is simplified for the entire flume flow range. For other throat configurations refer to the manufacturer's flow tables.

Throat Width	Coefficient (C)	Exponent (n)
4 inch	1.68	1.9
6 inch	2.18	1.9
8 inch	2.591	1.9
10 inch	2.961	1.9
12 inch	3.31	1.9
15 inch	3.79	1.9
18 inch	4.23	1.9
21 inch	4.61	1.9
24 inch	5.03	1.9

== Free-Flow vs. Submerged Flow ==
Free-Flow – when there is no “back water” to restrict flow through a flume. Only the single depth (primary point of measurement - Ha) needs to be measured to calculate the flow rate. A free flow also induces a hydraulic jump downstream of the flume.

Submerged Flow – when the water surface downstream of the flume is high enough to restrict flow through a flume, the flume is deemed to be submerged. Submergence transitions for Palmer-Bowlus flumes are quite high - 85-90%. As a result, corrections for submerged flow in Palmer-Bowlus flumes have not been published. As a result, it is important to set the flume so that it does not experience submerged flow conditions. Although commonly thought of as occurring at higher flow rates, submerged flow can exist at any flow level as it is a function of downstream conditions. In natural stream applications, submerged flow is frequently the result of vegetative growth on the downstream channel banks, sedimentation, or subsidence of the flume.

== Construction ==
Unlike other flumes - such as the Parshall, the Palmer-Bowlus flumes is typically only fabricated in two materials:

- Fiberglass (wastewater applications due to its corrosion resistance)
- Stainless steel (applications involving high temperatures / corrosive flow streams)

== Drawbacks ==
For standard Palmer-Bowlus flumes with the standard trapezoidal throat ramp:

- The flume may experience sedimentation / solids drop out upstream of the throat ramp. This is particularly true if the flow rates are low and the solids content is high or the solids heavy.
- Unlike other flumes where the design and discharge equations have been standardized, Palmer-Bowlus flume may not be readily programmed into the secondary flow meters commonly used with the flume.
- As a long-throated flume, the Palmer-Bowlus flume requires long straight runs upstream - 25 pipe diameters.
