= Flume =

Human-made channel for water

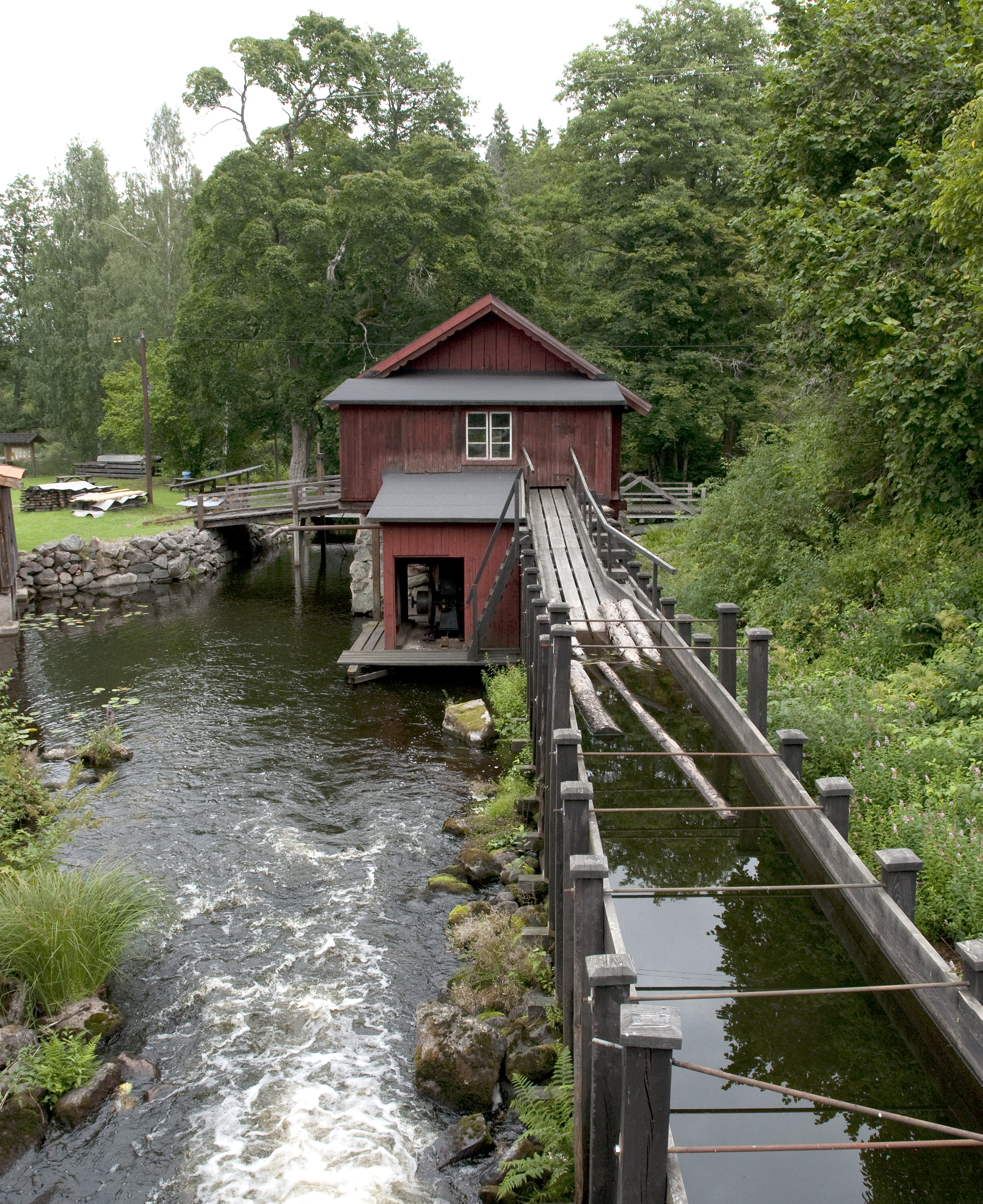
Log flume in Sweden, August 2010

A flume is a human-made channel for water, in the form of an open declined gravity chute whose walls are raised above the surrounding terrain, in contrast to a trench or ditch. Flumes route water from a diversion dam or weir to a desired materiel collection location. Flumes are usually made up of wood, metal or concrete.

Many flumes took the form of wooden troughs elevated on trestles, often following the natural contours of the land. Originating as a part of a mill race, they were later used in the transportation of logs in the logging industry, known as a log flume. They were also extensively used in hydraulic mining and working placer deposits for gold, tin and other heavy minerals.

== Etymology ==
The term flume comes from the Old French word flum, from the Latin flumen, meaning a river. It was formerly used for a stream, and particularly for the tail of a mill race. It is used in America for a very narrow gorge running between precipitous rocks, with a stream at the bottom, but more frequently is applied to an artificial channel of wood or other material for the diversion of a stream of water from a river for purposes of irrigation, for running a sawmill, or for various processes in the hydraulic method of gold-mining.

== Types of flumes ==
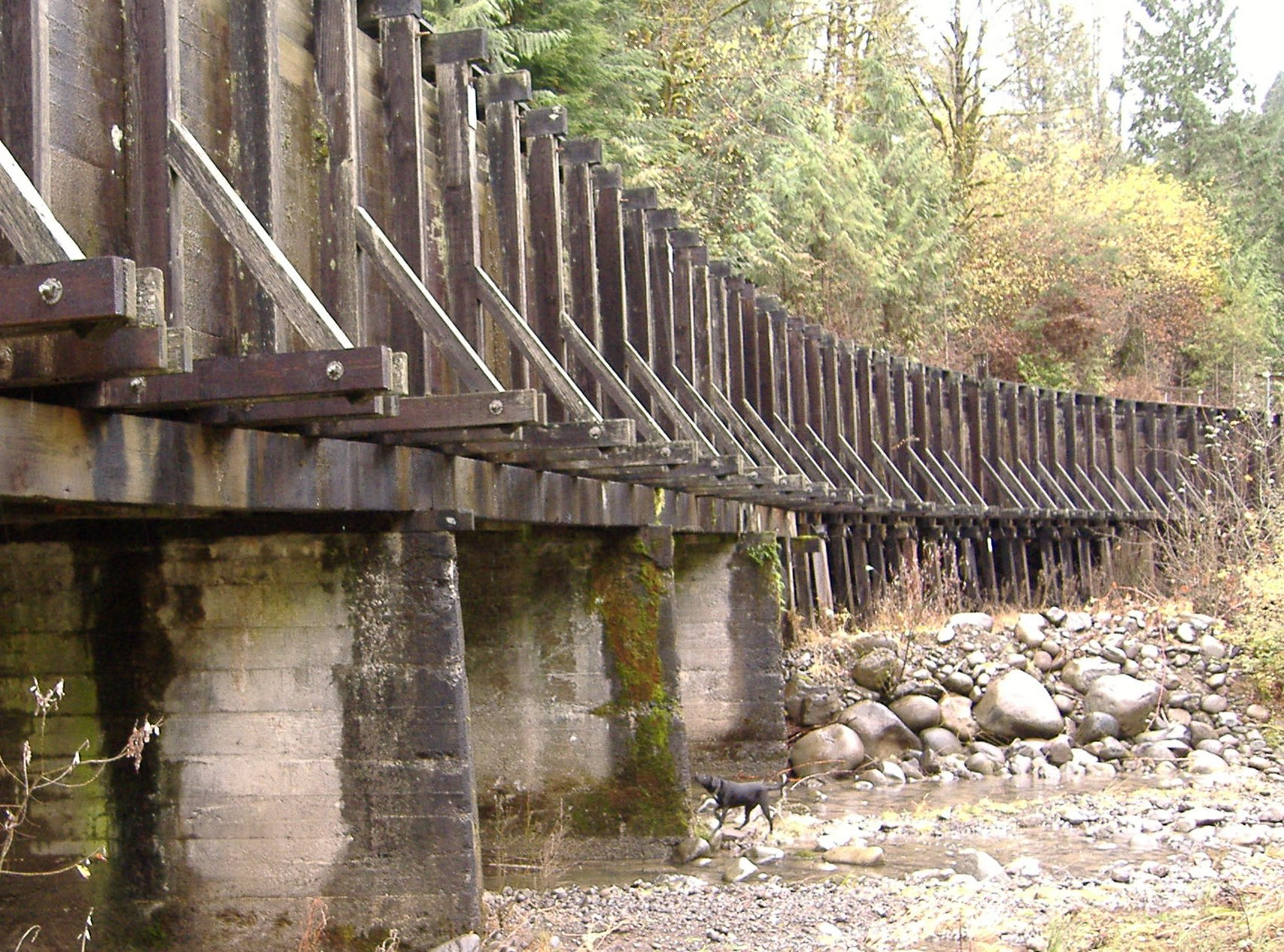
Bull Run Hydroelectric Project diversion flume, carrying water from one reservoir to another

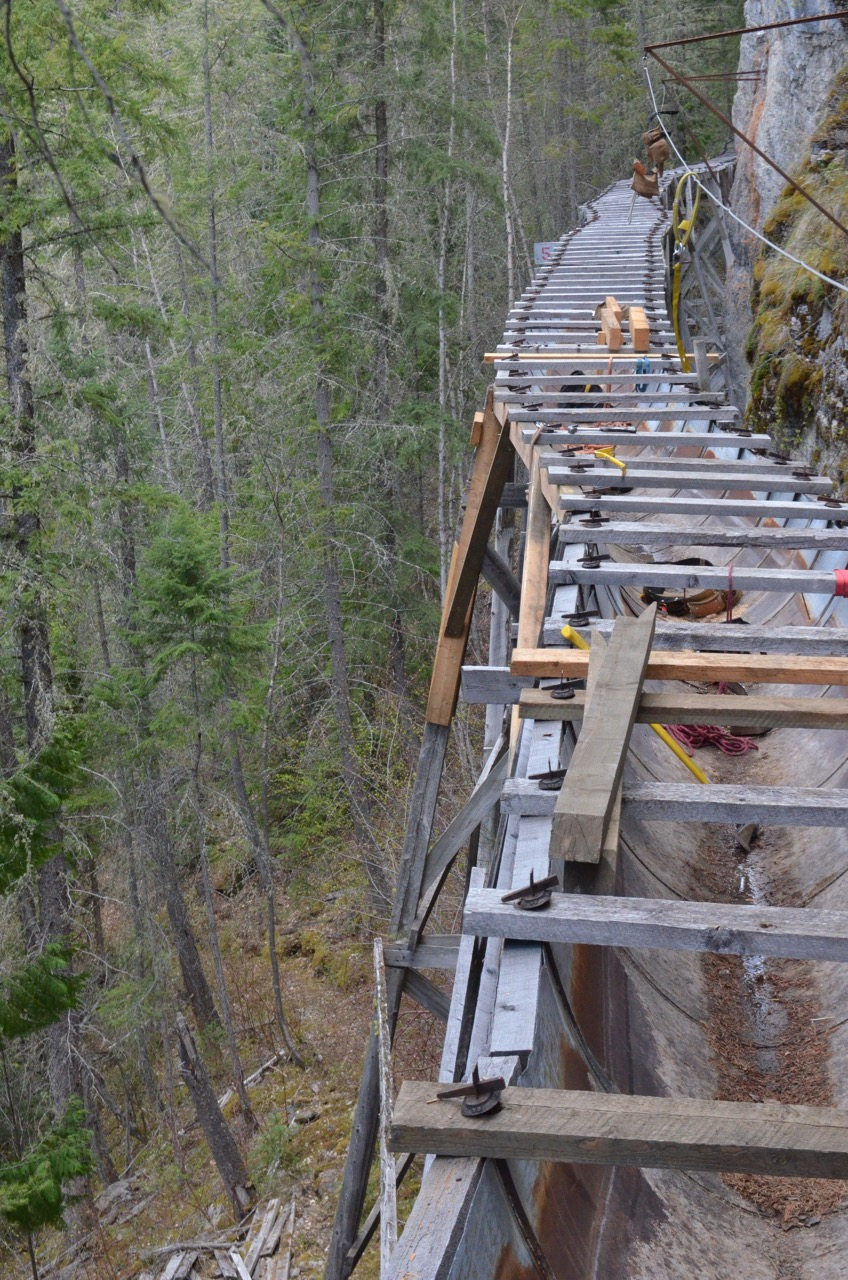
Working irrigation flume under repair in the East Kootenay, British Columbia, Canada. Built in 1912, it runs 8 km to provide water to a few dozen farms.

=== Millrace ===
A diversionary flume is used to transfer water from one body to another, such as between two reservoirs.

=== Log flume ===
Log flumes use the flow of water to carry cut logs and timber downhill, sometimes many miles, to either a sawmill or location for further transport.

=== Flow measurement flume ===
Some varieties of flumes are used in measuring water flow of a larger channel. When used to measure the flow of water in open channels, a flume is defined as a specially shaped, fixed hydraulic structure that under free-flow conditions forces flow to accelerate in such a manner that the flow rate through the flume can be characterized by a level-to-flow relationship as applied to a single head (level) measurement within the flume. Acceleration is accomplished through a convergence of the sidewalls, a change in floor elevation, or a combination of the two.

Flow measurement flumes typically consist of a converging section, a throat section, and a diverging section. Not all sections, however, need to be present. In the case of the Cutthroat flume, the converging section directly joins the diverging section, resulting in a throat section of no length (hence the term "Cutthroat"). Other flumes omit the diverging section (Montana, USGS Portable Parshall, and HS / H / HL flumes).

Flumes offer distinct advantages over sharp-crested weirs:

- For the same control width, the head loss for a flume is about one-fourth of that needed to operate a sharp-crested weir
- The velocity of approach is part of the calibration equations for flumes
- Unauthorized altering of the dimensions of constructed flumes is difficult (and therefore unlikely)
- Most flume styles readily allow for the passage of sedimentation and floating debris – reducing the time and effort associated with maintaining a flume installation

Styles of flow measurement flumes include: Cutthroat, HS / H / HL-type, Khafagi, Montana, RBC, Parshall, Palmer-Bowlus, Trapezoidal, and Venturi Flume.

=== Navigable canal flume ===
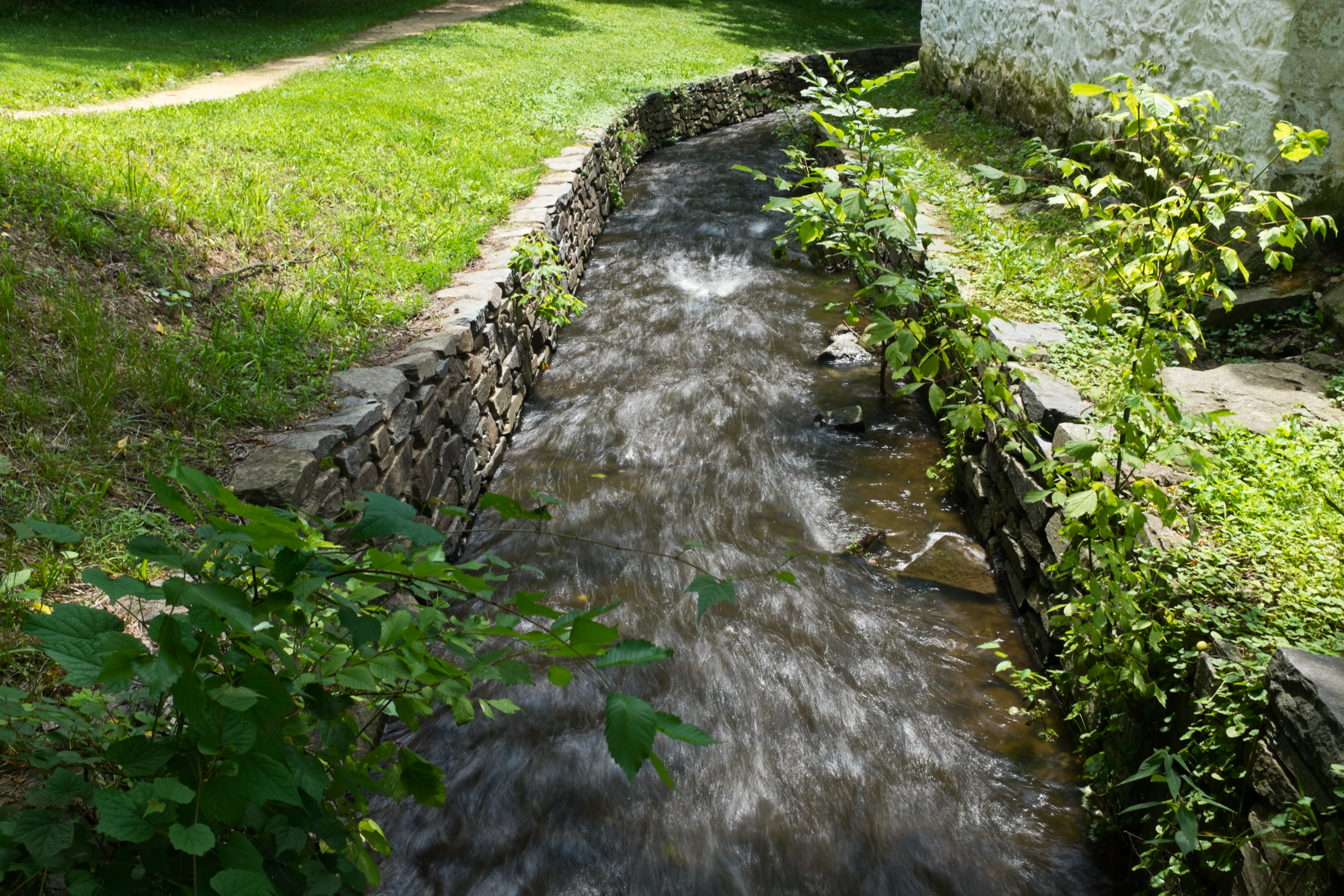
A bypass flume on the Chesapeake and Ohio Canal

In some nineteenth-century canals, a bypass flume diverted water around a lift lock from the level (or pound) above to the level below the lock, so that the level below would have sufficient water.

=== Recreational flumes ===
In competitive swimming, specialized flumes with transparent sides are often employed by coaches to analyze a swimmer's technique. The speed of the flow is variable to accommodate the full spectrum of swimming styles and ability.

== Gallery ==
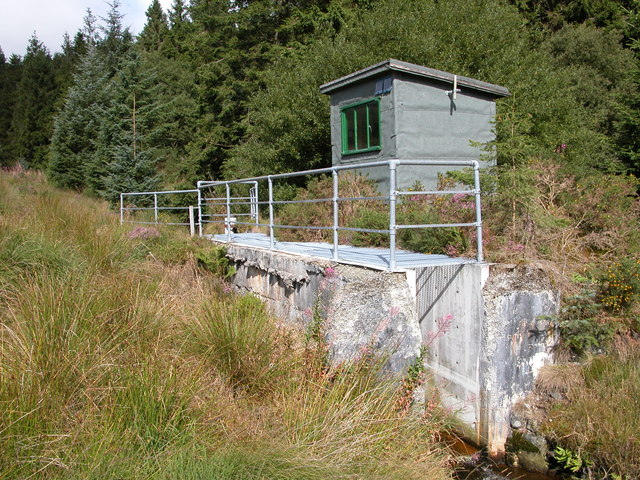
Measuring flume in the UK

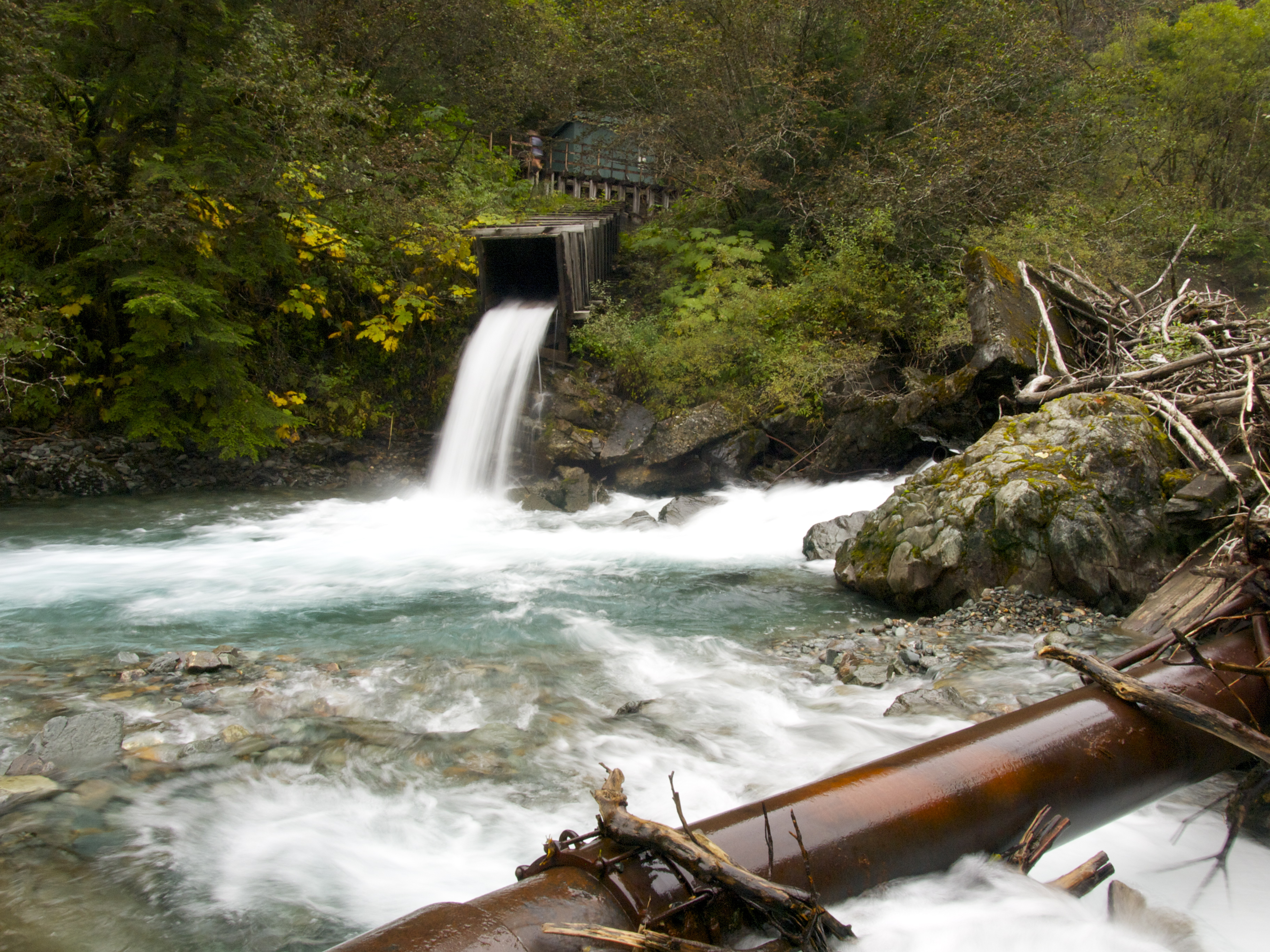
Flume outflow

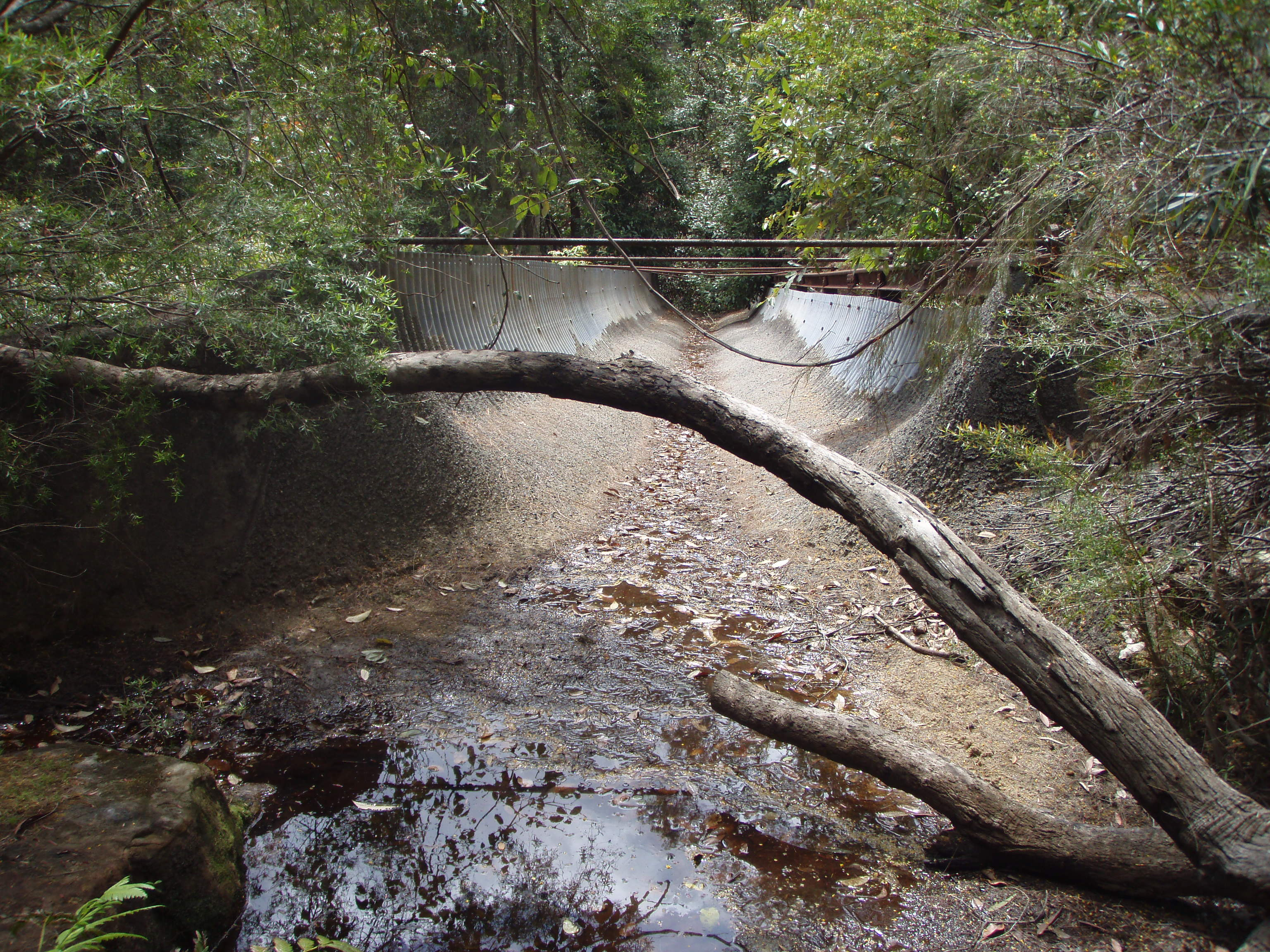
A temporary flume in New South Wales

== See also ==
- Acequia
- Aqueduct (water supply)
- Canal
- Leat
- Log flume
- Mill race
- Penstock
