= Venturi flume =

Hydraulic structure for flow measurement

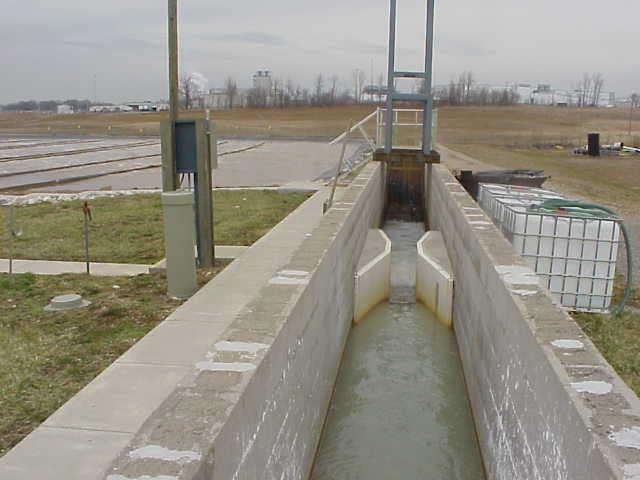
A venturi flume in a wastewater treatment plant

In hydrology, a Venturi flume is a device used for measuring the rate of flow of a liquid in situations with large flow rates, such as a river. It is based on the Venturi effect, for which it is named. It was first developed by V.M. Cone in Fort Collins, Colorado.

The Venturi flume consists of a flume with a constricted section in the center. By the Venturi effect, this causes a drop in the fluid pressure at the center of the constriction. By comparing the fluid pressure at the center of the flume with that earlier in the device, the rate of flow can be measured.
