= Index of physics articles (H) =

The index of physics articles is split into multiple pages due to its size.

To navigate by individual letter use the table of contents below.

== H ==
- H-1NF
- H-alpha
- H-stable potential
- H-theorem
- H. Dieter Zeh
- H. Eugene Stanley
- H. J. Round
- H. Jay Melosh
- H. Pierre Noyes
- H. Richard Crane
- H. Stanley Allen
- H1 (particle detector)
- HEPnet
- HERA-B
- HERMES experiment
- HLX-1
- HT-7
- High-temperature engineering test reactor
- Haag's theorem
- Haag–Lopuszanski–Sohnius theorem
- Hadamard–Rybczynski equation
- Hadron
- Hadron Elektron Ring Anlage
- Hadron epoch
- Hadron spectroscopy
- Hadronization
- Hafele–Keating experiment
- Hafnium controversy
- Hagedorn temperature
- Hagen Kleinert
- Hagen–Poiseuille equation
- Hagen–Poiseuille flow from the Navier–Stokes equations
- Haidinger fringe
- Haim Harari
- Hajo Meyer
- Hal Anger
- Halbach array
- Halden Boiling Water Reactor
- Halden Reactor
- Half-life
- Half-metal
- Half-value layer
- Half time (physics)
- Hall effect
- Hall-effect sensor
- Hall-effect thruster
- Hall probe
- Halo (optical phenomenon)
- Halo Occupation Distribution
- Halo nucleus
- Halothermal circulation
- Halpin–Tsai model
- Halton Arp
- Hamilton's principal function
- Hamilton's principle
- Hamiltonian (quantum mechanics)
- Hamiltonian constraint
- Hamiltonian fluid mechanics
- Hamiltonian lattice gauge theory
- Hamiltonian mechanics
- Hamiltonian system
- Hamiltonian vector field
- Hamilton–Jacobi equation
- Hammar experiment
- Hampson–Linde cycle
- Hanany–Witten transition
- Hanbury Brown and Twiss effect
- Hand boiler
- Handbook of Porphyrin Science
- Hang gliding
- Hanna Nasser (academic)
- Hannay angle
- Hannes Alfvén
- Hannes Alfvén Prize
- Hanns Hörbiger
- Hannspeter Winter
- Hans-Arwed Weidenmüller
- Hans-Dieter Betz
- Hans-Hermann Hupfeld
- Hans-Joachim Queisser
- Hans-Peter Dürr
- Hans Albert Einstein
- Hans Benndorf
- Hans Bethe
- Hans Breuer (physicist)
- Hans Christian von Baeyer
- Hans Christian Ørsted
- Hans Eduard Suess
- Hans Ferdinand Mayer
- Hans Frauenfelder
- Hans G. Hornung
- Hans Geiger
- Hans Georg Dehmelt
- Hans Grassmann
- Hans Hellmann
- Hans Henrik Andersen
- Hans Hollmann
- Hans K. Ziegler
- Hans Kopfermann
- Hans Kramers
- Hans Kronberger (physicist)
- Hans Lippershey
- Hans Reissner
- Hans Suess
- Hans Thirring
- Hans Volker Klapdor-Kleingrothaus
- Hans W. Liepmann
- Hans Wolter
- Hans von Halban
- Hans von Ohain
- Hansjoerg Dittus
- Hantaro Nagaoka
- Harald Herborg Nielsen
- Harald Keres
- Harald Lesch
- Harald Schering
- Harald Wergeland
- Hard radiation
- Hard spheres
- Harlan True Stetson
- Harley Rutledge
- Harmonic
- Harmonic coordinate condition
- Harmonic oscillator
- Harmonic superspace
- Harmonices Mundi
- Harold A. Wilson (physicist)
- Harold Agnew
- Harold E. Johns
- Harold E. Puthoff
- Harold Furth
- Harold Hopkins
- Harold Jeffreys
- Harold L. Brode
- Harold Max Rosenberg
- Harold McCarter Taylor
- Harold McMaster
- Harold Neville Vazeille Temperley
- Harold R. Kaufman
- Harold Warris Thompson
- Harrie Massey
- Harriet Brooks
- Harris functional
- Harrison Brown
- Harry Boot
- Harry Hammond Hess
- Harry J. Lipkin
- Harry Daghlian
- Harry Kloor
- Harry Kroger
- Harry Lehmann
- Harry Messel
- Harry Swinney
- Harry Zvi Tabor
- Hartland Snyder
- Hartle–Hawking state
- Hartman effect
- Hartmut Kallmann
- Hartree
- Hartree–Fock method
- Harvard Project Physics
- Harvard–Smithsonian Center for Astrophysics
- Harvey Einbinder
- Harvey Fletcher
- Hasegawa–Mima equation
- Hassan Aref
- Hassan Jawahery
- Haverah Park experiment
- Havriliak–Negami relaxation
- Hawking energy
- Hawking radiation
- Hayashi track
- Hayes similitude principle
- Haynes–Shockley experiment
- Hazen–Williams equation
- He Xiantu
- Head-related transfer function
- Head of tide
- Head shadow
- Headwind
- Heat
- Heat bath
- Heat capacity
- Heat capacity ratio
- Heat current
- Heat death of the universe
- Heat engine
- Heat equation
- Heat flux
- Heat generation in integrated circuits
- Heat kernel
- Heat loss due to linear thermal bridging
- Heat of sublimation
- Heat pump
- Heat pump and refrigeration cycle
- Heat spreader
- Heat transfer
- Heat transfer coefficient
- Heat transmission
- Heather Couper
- Heather Reid
- Heating pad
- Heaviside condition
- Heavy Rydberg system
- Heavy neutrino
- Heavy water
- Hedwig Kohn
- Heidi Jo Newberg
- Heike Kamerlingh Onnes
- Heim theory
- Heino Finkelmann
- Heinrich Barkhausen
- Heinrich Bürger
- Heinrich Friedrich Weber
- Heinrich Geißler
- Heinrich Greinacher
- Heinrich Gustav Magnus
- Heinrich Hertz
- Heinrich Kayser
- Heinrich Konen
- Heinrich Lenz
- Heinrich Ott (physicist)
- Heinrich Rohrer
- Heinrich Rubens
- Heinrich Streintz
- Heinrich Welker
- Heinrich Wilhelm Brandes
- Heinrich Wilhelm Dove
- Heinrich Wilhelm Matthias Olbers
- Heinrich von Wild
- Heinz-Jürgen Kluge
- Heinz Barwich
- Heinz Kohnen
- Heinz London
- Heinz Maier-Leibnitz
- Heinz Oberhummer
- Heinz Pagels
- Heinz Pose
- Heisenberg's microscope
- Heisenberg model (quantum)
- Heisenberg picture
- Heisler Chart
- Hele-Shaw flow
- Helen Quinn
- Helen T. Edwards
- Heliac
- Helically Symmetric Experiment
- Helicity (particle physics)
- Helicity basis
- Helicon (physics)
- Helicon discharge
- Helikon vortex separation process
- Helimagnetism
- Heliocentrism
- Heliophysics
- Helioseismology
- Heliosphere
- Heliospheric current sheet
- Heliotron
- Helium-3 refrigerator
- Helium atom
- Helium atom scattering
- Helium flash
- Helium fusion
- Helium line ratio
- Helium mass spectrometer
- Helium planet
- Helium–neon laser
- Helix–coil transition model
- Hellmann–Feynman theorem
- Hellmut Fritzsche
- Helmholtz's theorems
- Helmholtz coil
- Helmholtz decomposition
- Helmholtz equation
- Helmholtz flow
- Helmholtz free energy
- Helmholtz reciprocity
- Helmholtz resonance
- Helmholtz theorem (classical mechanics)
- Helmut Gröttrup
- Helmut Hönl
- Helmut Volz
- Helsinki Institute of Physics
- Hemodynamics
- Hendricus Stoof
- Hendrik Casimir
- Hendrik Lorentz
- Hendrik Tennekes
- Hendrik Wade Bode
- Henri Bacry
- Henri Becquerel
- Henri Buisson
- Henri Bénard
- Henri Chrétien
- Henri Daniel Rathgeber
- Henri Pitot
- Henri Poincaré
- Henri Poincaré Prize
- Henri Victor Regnault
- Henrik Svensmark
- Henry's law
- Henry (unit)
- Henry Andrews Bumstead
- Henry Augustus Rowland
- Henry Brose
- Henry Cabourn Pocklington
- Henry Cavendish
- Henry Coddington
- Henry Darcy
- Henry DeWolf Smyth
- Henry Draper Medal
- Henry Duckworth
- Henry Gale (astrophysicist)
- Henry Gellibrand
- Henry H. Barschall
- Henry Hemmendinger
- Henry Hurwitz, Jr.
- Henry Kater
- Henry Katzenstein
- Henry Kolm
- Henry Lipson
- Henry M. Foley
- Henry Margenau
- Henry Minchin Noad
- Henry Moseley
- Henry Primakoff
- Henry S. Valk
- Henry Smith Carhart
- Henry Stapp
- Henry Tye
- Henry Way Kendall
- Henryk Niewodniczański
- Henyey track
- Heraclitus
- Herbert A. Hauptman
- Herbert Arthur Stuart
- Herbert Callen
- Herbert Dingle
- Herbert E. Ives
- Herbert Friedman
- Herbert Fröhlich
- Herbert Gleiter
- Herbert Goldstein
- Herbert Gursky
- Herbert Huppert
- Herbert Kroemer
- Herbert L. Anderson
- Herbert Mataré
- Herbert S. Green
- Herbert Walther
- Herbert Wilson
- Herbert York
- Herbig–Haro object
- Herman Branson
- Herman Carr
- Herman Chernoff
- Herman Feshbach
- Herman March
- Herman Verlinde
- Herman Z. Cummins
- Hermann Arthur Jahn
- Hermann Bondi
- Hermann Brück
- Hermann Glauert
- Hermann Grassmann
- Hermann Haken
- Hermann Knoblauch
- Hermann Minkowski
- Hermann Oberth
- Hermann Schlichting
- Hermann Weyl
- Hermann von Helmholtz
- Hermann–Mauguin notation
- Hermetic detector
- Heron's fountain
- Herpolhode
- Herschel–Bulkley fluid
- Hertha Sponer
- Hertha Wambacher
- Hertz
- Hertzsprung gap
- Hertzsprung–Russell diagram
- Herwig Schopper
- Hess's law
- Hessel de Vries
- Heteroazeotrope
- Heteroclinic cycle
- Heteroclinic orbit
- Heterojunction
- Heterojunction bipolar transistor
- Heterotic string
- Heusler alloy
- Hexagonal crystal system
- Hexagonally closed packed metal
- Hexatic fluid phase
- HiPER
- HiVOLT
- Hicks Building
- Hidden sector
- Hidden subgroup problem
- Hidden-variable theory
- Hideki Yukawa
- Hideo Mabuchi
- Hidetsugu Ikegami
- Hierarchy problem
- Higgs boson
- Higgs field
- Higgs mechanism
- Higgs phase
- Higgs sector
- Higgsino
- High-Z Supernova Search Team
- High-altitude wind power
- High-efficiency hybrid cycle
- High-energy X-rays
- High-energy visible light
- High-intensity focused ultrasound
- High-κ dielectric
- High-lift device
- High-refractive-index polymer
- High-resolution scheme
- High-temperature electrolysis
- High-temperature superconductivity
- High Energy Stereoscopic System
- High Flux Australian Reactor
- High Flux Isotope Reactor
- High Frequency Active Auroral Research Program
- High Resolution Fly's Eye Cosmic Ray Detector
- High Speed Photometer
- High energy nuclear physics
- High frequency
- High frequency approximation
- High pressure
- High pressure physics
- High voltage
- Higher-dimensional Einstein gravity
- Higher-dimensional supergravity
- Higher spin alternating sign matrix
- Highly charged ion
- Hilbert C*-module
- Hilbert space
- Hilbert spectrum
- Hilbrand J. Groenewold
- Hilding Faxén
- Hillard Bell Huntington
- Hilmi Volkan Demir
- Himiko (Lyman-alpha blob)
- Hipot
- Hippasus
- HippoDraw
- Hippolyte Fizeau
- Hiromichi Kataura
- Hiroo Kanamori
- Hirosi Ooguri
- Hiss (electromagnetic)
- History of Lorentz transformations
- History of Mars observation
- History of Planck's law
- History of Solar System formation and evolution hypotheses
- History of X-ray astronomy
- History of centrifugal and centripetal forces
- History of classical mechanics
- History of electrical engineering
- History of electromagnetic theory
- History of electrophoresis
- History of entropy
- History of experiments
- History of fluid mechanics
- History of gamma-ray burst research
- History of general relativity
- History of geomagnetism
- History of geophysics
- History of gravitational theory
- History of heat
- History of loop quantum gravity
- History of materials science
- History of metamaterials
- History of nuclear weapons
- History of optics
- History of physics
- History of quantum field theory
- History of quantum mechanics
- History of radio
- History of special relativity
- History of spectroscopy
- History of string theory
- History of superconductivity
- History of the Big Bang theory
- History of the Earth
- History of the battery
- History of the metre
- History of the metric system
- History of the periodic table
- History of the transistor
- History of thermodynamics
- History of variational principles in physics
- Hjulström curve
- Hodograph
- Hofmeister series
- Hofstadter's butterfly
- Hohlraum
- Hole argument
- Holevo's theorem
- Holger Bech Nielsen
- Hollow-cathode lamp
- Hollow Earth
- Holographic interferometry
- Holographic principle
- Holographic sensor
- Holography
- Holon (physics)
- Holonomic basis
- Holonomic constraints
- Holstein–Herring method
- Holstein–Primakoff transformation
- Homentropic flow
- Homeokinetics
- Homer Dudley
- Homer L. Dodge
- Homes's law
- Homestake Mine (South Dakota)
- Homestake experiment
- Homi J. Bhabha
- Homoclinic orbit
- Homoeoid
- Homogeneity (physics)
- Homogeneity and heterogeneity
- Homogeneous broadening
- Homogeneous isotropic turbulence
- Homologous temperature
- Homotopy analysis method
- Hongjie Dai
- Hooke's law
- Hoop Conjecture
- Hopkinson's law
- Horace-Bénédict de Saussure
- Horace Hearne Institute
- Horace Lamb
- Horaţiu Năstase
- Horizon (general relativity)
- Horizon problem
- Horizontal Falls
- Horizontal plane
- Hormesis
- Horn antenna
- Horror vacui (physics)
- Horseshoe orbit
- Horseshoe vortex
- Horst Korsching
- Horst Ludwig Störmer
- Horst Stöcker
- Host galaxy
- Hot-carrier injection
- Hot chocolate effect
- Hot electron
- Hot spot effect in subatomic physics
- Hough function
- How to Build a Time Machine
- Howard A. Stone
- Howard Berg
- Howard Brandt
- Howard Georgi
- Howard Grubb
- Howard H. Aiken
- Howard J. Van Till
- Howard M. Wiseman
- Howard P. Robertson
- Howard Petch
- Howard Wilson Emmons
- Howell Peregrine
- Hoyle–Narlikar theory of gravity
- Hořava–Lifshitz gravity
- Hořava–Witten domain wall
- Hu Jimin
- Hu Ning
- Huang Kun
- Hubbard model
- Hubble's law
- Hubble Bubble (astronomy)
- Hubble Deep Field
- Hubble Deep Field South
- Hubble Extreme Deep Field
- Hubble Ultra-Deep Field
- Hubble volume
- Huber's equation
- Hubert Chanson
- Hubert Curien
- Hubert Reeves
- Hubert Yockey
- Huchra's lens
- Huemul Project
- Hugh Bradner
- Hugh David Politzer
- Hugh E. Montgomery
- Hugh Everett III
- Hugh Latimer Dryden
- Hugh Le Caine
- Hugh Longbourne Callendar
- Hugh Ross (creationist)
- Hugh W. Hardy
- Hughes–Drever experiment
- Hugo Benioff
- Hugo Christiaan Hamaker
- Hugo Rietveld
- Hugo Tetrode
- Hull speed
- Human echolocation
- Humidity
- Humphrey Maris
- Humphreys series
- Hund's rule of maximum multiplicity
- Hund's rules
- Hundred-year wave
- Hung Cheng
- Hunter Rouse
- Hunter–Saxton equation
- Hunting oscillation
- Husimi Q representation
- Huygens–Fresnel principle
- Hybrid airship
- Hybrid functional
- Hybrid image
- Hybrid solar cell
- Hydraulic accumulator
- Hydraulic circuit
- Hydraulic cylinder
- Hydraulic diameter
- Hydraulic fluid
- Hydraulic head
- Hydraulic jump
- Hydraulic jumps in rectangular channels
- Hydraulic machinery
- Hydraulic manifold
- Hydraulics
- Hydrodynamic stability
- Hydrodynamical helicity
- Hydrodynamics
- Hydroelasticity
- Hydrogen-burning process
- Hydrogen-like atom
- Hydrogen anion
- Hydrogen atom
- Hydrogen bomb
- Hydrogen embrittlement
- Hydrogen fluoride laser
- Hydrogen ion
- Hydrogen ion cluster
- Hydrogen line
- Hydrogen maser
- Hydrogen silsesquioxane
- Hydrogen spectral series
- Hydrophone
- Hydropower
- Hydrostatic equilibrium
- Hydrostatic fluid
- Hydrothermal synthesis
- Hydroxyl ion absorption
- Hygrometer
- Hyper-Kamiokande
- HyperPhysics
- Hyperbolic coordinates
- Hyperbolic equilibrium point
- Hyperbolic motion (relativity)
- Hyperbolic orthogonality
- Hyperbolic quaternion
- Hyperbolic set
- Hyperbolic trajectory
- Hypercharge
- Hyperchromicity
- Hypercompact stellar system
- Hyperelastic material
- Hyperfine structure
- Hypergravity
- Hyperlens
- Hypernetted-chain equation
- Hypernova
- Hypernuclei
- Hypernucleus
- Hyperon
- Hyperplane
- Hyperpolarizability
- Hyperpolarization (physics)
- Hyperradiant Fresnel lens
- Hypersonic effect
- Hypersonic speed
- Hypersonic wind tunnel
- Hyperspace (book)
- Hyperspectral imaging
- Hypertriton
- Hypervelocity
- Hyporheic zone
- Hypotheses non fingo
- Hypothetical star
- Hypsochromic shift
- Hypsometric equation
- Hysteresis
- Hysteresivity
- Hélène Langevin-Joliot
- Hückel method
