= Hidetsugu =

- Gender: Male

Origin
- Origin: Japanese
- Meaning: Different meanings depending on the kanji used

Hidetsugu (written: 秀次 or 英嗣) is a masculine Japanese given name. Notable people with the name include:

- Hidetsugu Aneha (姉歯 秀次; born 1957), Japanese architect
- Toyotomi Hidetsugu (豊臣 秀次; 1568–1595), Japanese daimyō
- Hidetsugu Ikegami, Japanese physicist
- Hidetsugu Shibata (柴田 英嗣; born 1975), Japanese comedian
- Hidetsugu Yagi (八木 秀次; 1886–1976), Japanese electrical engineer
