= Hemmendinger =

Hemmendinger is a surname. Notable people with the surname include:

- Henry Hemmendinger (1915–2003), American scientist
- Judith Hemmendinger (1923–2024), German-Israeli social researcher and author
