= Tomasz Skwarnicki =

Polish-American particle physicist at Syracuse University

- Born: January 1, 1958 (age 68)
- Education: Institute of Nuclear Physics of the Polish Academy of Sciences; Jagiellonian University
- Known for: pentaquarks
- Awards: Fellow of American Physical Society (2001)
- Scientific career
- Fields: Elementary particle physics High energy physics
- Workplaces: Syracuse University; DESY; Southern Methodist University; CERN
- Thesis: A Study of the Radiative Cascade Transitions Between the Upsilon-prime and Upsilon Resonances (1986)
- Website: artsandsciences.syracuse.edu/people/faculty/skwarnicki-tomasz/

Tomasz Skwarnicki is a Polish-American physicist and professor at Syracuse University. He is known for his research on gravitational wave detectors, experimental elementary particle physics, the Large Hadron Collider beauty experiment (LHCb), and pentaquarks.

== Education ==
Skwarnicki obtained a M.Sc. in Physics from Jagiellonian University in Kraków, Poland in 1982. He joined the Institute of Nuclear Physics in Kraków to earn a PhD in 1986.

== Awards ==
Skwarnicki began his academic career at the Deutsches Elektronen-Synchrotron (DESY) in Hamburg, Germany and moved to the US in 1988. In 1989, he joined the Department of Physics at Syracuse University as an assistant professor. He joined faculty at Southern Methodist University in 1992 while working at the Superconducting Super Collider in Dallas. He moved back to Syracuse in 1995.

Skwarnicki was elected a fellow of the American Physical Society in 2001.
