= Anna Stasto =

Polish physicist

- Education: Jagiellonian University; University of Durham
- Known for: Research on quantum chromodynamics
- Scientific career
- Fields: Particle physics Nuclear physics
- Workplaces: Pennsylvania State University
- Thesis: QCD analysis of deep inelastic lepton-hadron scattering in the region of small values of the bjorken parameter x (1999)
- Doctoral advisor: Jan Kwiecinski
- Website: science.psu.edu/physics/people/ams52

Anna Maria Stasto is a Polish-American particle physicist and a Professor of Physics at Pennsylvania State University.

Stasto studied Physics at Jagiellonian University, graduating in 1996. She completed her PhD in 1999, which was awarded jointly by the Institute of Nuclear Physics of the Polish Academy of Sciences and Durham University. She was supervised by Jan Kwiecinski, with additional support from Alan Martin.

Stasto was a research associate in the Physics Department of Brookhaven National Laboratory from 2004 to 2006. In 2008 she became Assistant Professor in the Department of Physics at Pennsylvania State University, while retaining a joint position at Brookhaven. She received the Department of Energy Outstanding Junior Investigator Award as well as a Sloan Research Fellowship in 2009. She was promoted to Professor at Penn State in 2019.

She was elected a Fellow of the American Physical Society in 2023 for her contributions to the study of quantum chromodynamics.
