= HTB =

HTB may refer to:

- Havic: The Bothering, a parody card game
- Heat loss due to linear thermal bridging (H_{TB})
- Hierarchical token bucket, a computer networking algorithm
- Hizb ut-Tahrir Britain, the UK branch of Islamist organisation Hizb ut-Tahrir
- Holy Trinity Brompton, a church in London, England
- Hokkaido Television Broadcasting, in Japan
- Household Troops Band of the Salvation Army
- Hack The Box, an online cybersecurity training platform
- HowToBasic, an Australian YouTuber

== See also ==
- NTV (disambiguation) (Cyrillic: HTB)
