= Spin matrix =

The term spin matrix refers to a number of matrices, which are related to Spin (physics).

== Quantum mechanics and pure mathematics ==
- Pauli matrices, also called the "Pauli spin matrices".
- Generalizations of Pauli matrices
- Gamma matrices, which can be represented in terms of the Pauli matrices.
- Higher-dimensional gamma matrices

== See also ==
In pure mathematics and physics:

- Wigner D-matrix, represent spins and rotations of quantum states and tensor operators.
- Higher spin alternating sign matrix
- Spin group
- Spin (physics)#Higher spins
