= Hans Breuer =

Hans Breuer may refer to:

- Hans Breuer (physicist) (1933–2020), German physicist
- Hans Breuer (politician) (1930–2021), mayor of Augsburg, Germany
- Hans Breuer (tenor) (1868–1929), German opera singer (tenor) and director
