= Wallace D. Hayes =

Wallace Dean Hayes (September 4, 1918 – March 2, 2001) was a professor of mechanical and aerospace engineering at Princeton University and one of the world's leading theoretical aerodynamicists, whose numerous and fundamental contributions to the theories of supersonic and hypersonic flow and wave motion strongly influenced the design of aircraft at supersonic speeds and missiles at hypersonic speeds. This greatly enhanced the development of supersonic flight and supersonic aircraft design.

In a series of publications beginning in 1947 with his Ph.D. thesis under Theodore von Kármán at the California Institute of Technology , he developed a theory of supersonic flow called the area rule which strongly influenced the design of high-speed aircraft. His work also provided the first understanding of the behavior of delta wing aircraft flying just above the speed of sound.

He followed his work in supersonic flow with groundbreaking studies in the late 1940s and early 1950s in hypersonic flow, which is considered to begin at about five times the speed of sound, or Mach 5. He developed the Hayes similitude principle, which enabled designers to take the results of one series of tests or calculations and apply them to the design of an entire family of similar configurations where neither tests nor detailed calculations are available. Many of his developments appeared in his book Hypersonic Flow Theory, co-written with Ronald Probstein and first published in 1959.

He made important contributions to the understanding of sonic booms and served on numerous NASA advisory committees on the subject.

Hayes was born in Beijing, China and educated in California where he received his B.S. in physics in 1941 and his Ph.D. in physics, magna cum laude, in 1947 from the California Institute of Technology. His work in the aircraft industry began in 1939 with Consolidated Aircraft and continued during World War II as an aerodynamicist with North American Aviation. From 1952 to 1954 he was scientific liaison officer with the Office of Naval Research in London. In 1954, he came to Princeton University, where he taught until 1989. He also taught at the California Institute of Technology, Brown University, Delft Technical University, and the University of New Mexico at Holloman Air Force Base.

He was elected to the National Academy of Engineering, the American Academy of Arts and Sciences, the American Physical Society(Fellow, 1986) and the American Institute of Aeronautics and Astronautics, which honored him in 1965 with its Research Award.

Hayes was an active member of the Sierra Club since 1942 and an avid outdoor sports enthusiast enjoying rock-climbing, hiking, water sports, and skiing. He was also a glider and small airplane flight instructor.

He died on March 2, 2001, in Hightstown, New Jersey at age 82.

== Select publications ==
- Physics of Shock Waves (1967)
- Inviscid Flows (1967)
- Inviscid Flows (1966)
- Hypersonic Flow Theory (1966)
- Hypersonic Flow Theory (1959)
- Gasdynamic Discontinuities (1960)
- Linearized Supersonic Flows (1947)
- On Supersonic Similitude (1947)
- Linear Supersonic Flow (1947)
- Gasdynamic Discontinuities (1947)
