= Hayes similitude principle =

Aspect of aerodynamics

The Hayes similitude principle enabled aerodynamicists to take the results of one series of tests or calculations and apply them to the design of an entire family of similar configurations where neither tests nor detailed calculations are available.

The similitude principle was developed by Wallace D. Hayes, a pioneer in hypersonic flow, which is considered to begin at about five times the speed of sound, or Mach 5, and is described in his classic book Hypersonic Flow Theory co-written with Ronald Probstein and first published in 1959.

The behavior of the physical processes in actual problems is affected by so many physical quantities that a complete mathematical description thereof is usually very difficult and sometimes practically impossible due to the complicated nature of the phenomena. We know from experience that if two systems are geometrically similar there usually exists some kind of similarity under certain conditions, such as kinematic similarity, dynamic similarity, thermal similarity, and similarity of concentration distribution, and that if similarity conditions are satisfied we can greatly reduce the number of independent variables required to describe the behavior of the process. In this way, we can systematically understand. describe, and even predict the behavior of physical processes in real problems in a relatively simple manner. This principle is known as principle of similitude. Dimensional analysis is a method of deducing logical groupings of the variables, through which we can describe similarity criteria of the processes.

Physical quantities such as length [L], mass [M], time [T], and temperature are dimensional quantities and the magnitude of each quantity can be described by multiples of the unit of each dimension namely m, kg, s, and K, respectively. Through experience, we can select a certain number of fundamental dimensions, such as those mentioned above, and express all other dimensional quantities in terms of products of powers of these fundamental dimensions. Furthermore, in describing the behavior of physical processes, we know that there is an implicit principle that we cannot add or subtract physical quantities of different dimensions. This means that the equations governing physical processes must be dimensionally consistent and each term of the equation must have the same dimensions. This principle is known as the principle of dimensional homogeneity. (courtesy: Book: Mass transfer : from fundamentals to modern industrial applications, Publisher: Weinheim : WILEY-VCH, 2006.
