= Tailwater =

Waters located immediately downstream from a hydraulic structure

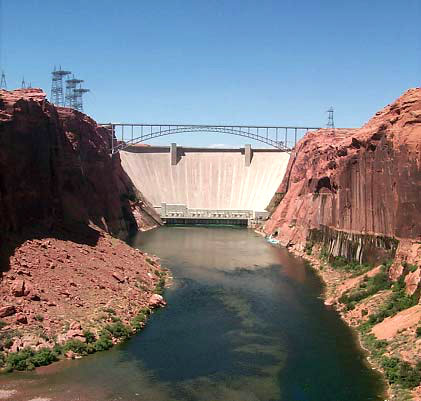
The Colorado River tailwater below Glen Canyon Dam

Tailwater refers to waters located immediately downstream from a hydraulic structure, such as a dam, spillway, bridge or culvert. Generally measured and reported as the average water depth downstream of a hydraulic structure, tailwater can vary based on the outlet from the structure as well as downstream influences that may restrict or advance the usual flow of water from the structure. The creation of a tailwater will have significant impacts on both the abiotic and biotic conditions of the waterway.

== Biotic impacts ==
The environmental conditions in a tailwater influence the entire food web of the waterway. Consistent flows, higher temperatures, and clear water found in tailwaters create an ideal habitat for filamentous green algae. The near-shore zones of tailwaters that are submerged during hydropeaking but dry during consistent flows are far less productive areas of the waterway. Most algal species are not adapted to handle this exposure to air for extended periods of time resulting in a loss of primary productivity and an increase in organic matter that gets washed away when flow increases.

=== Macroinvertebrate impacts ===
Macroinvertebrate communities assemblages largely depend on algal composition of the waterway. With the conditions created by hydropeaking in tailwaters, much of the macroinvertebrate diversity is lost resulting in a few dominant taxa. For example, the Colorado River experiences dramatic flow changes due to the abundance of hydroelectric dams on the river. Below the major dams, between three and seven macroinvertebrate taxa account for over 95% of the total abundance in the system. Nearly half of these species are specialists who spend their entire lives underwater and do not provide energy to the surrounding terrestrial environment.

=== Native fish impacts ===
Native fish species are particularly endangered by tailwaters. The construction of the tailwater itself is a severe environmental disturbance that can reduce richness, but immediately following dam completion, many native fish species can still be found. The long-term impacts on native fish communities, especially in historically warmwater systems, are especially dramatic. Before the completion of the Beaver Dam on the Ozark River, 62 species of fish from 19 unique families were present in the system. Following dam construction, only 18 species from 8 families were collected, with two families accounting for over 90% of the fish found. 30 years after the installment of the impoundment, 28 species of fish were sampled from 8 families, however 98% of the fish were either sculpin or trout species, both of which were essentially absent prior to the creation of the tailwater. This lack of species evenness results in an altered aquatic ecosystem that is far from the community makeup seen before the impoundment was in place. Substrate composition in tailwaters can also impact native fish survival. Some species, such as river chubs, construct nests from gravel and rocks found on the river bottom. Tailwater flows can alter substrate size making it difficult for native fish to build spawning areas. Increased flows can also flatten nesting sites or scour eggs from the nest making spawning in a tailwater system more difficult.

== Abiotic impacts ==
The construction of a dam will often change the makeup of the body of water immediately upstream and downstream of the structure. In many cases, the water that comes out of the dam originates from the bottom of the reservoir created by the impoundment. The resulting dam discharge is relatively cold compared to the natural temperature of waterway due to the stratification of water that occurs in reservoirs. The resulting thermal pollution can have devastating impacts on native fish assemblages.

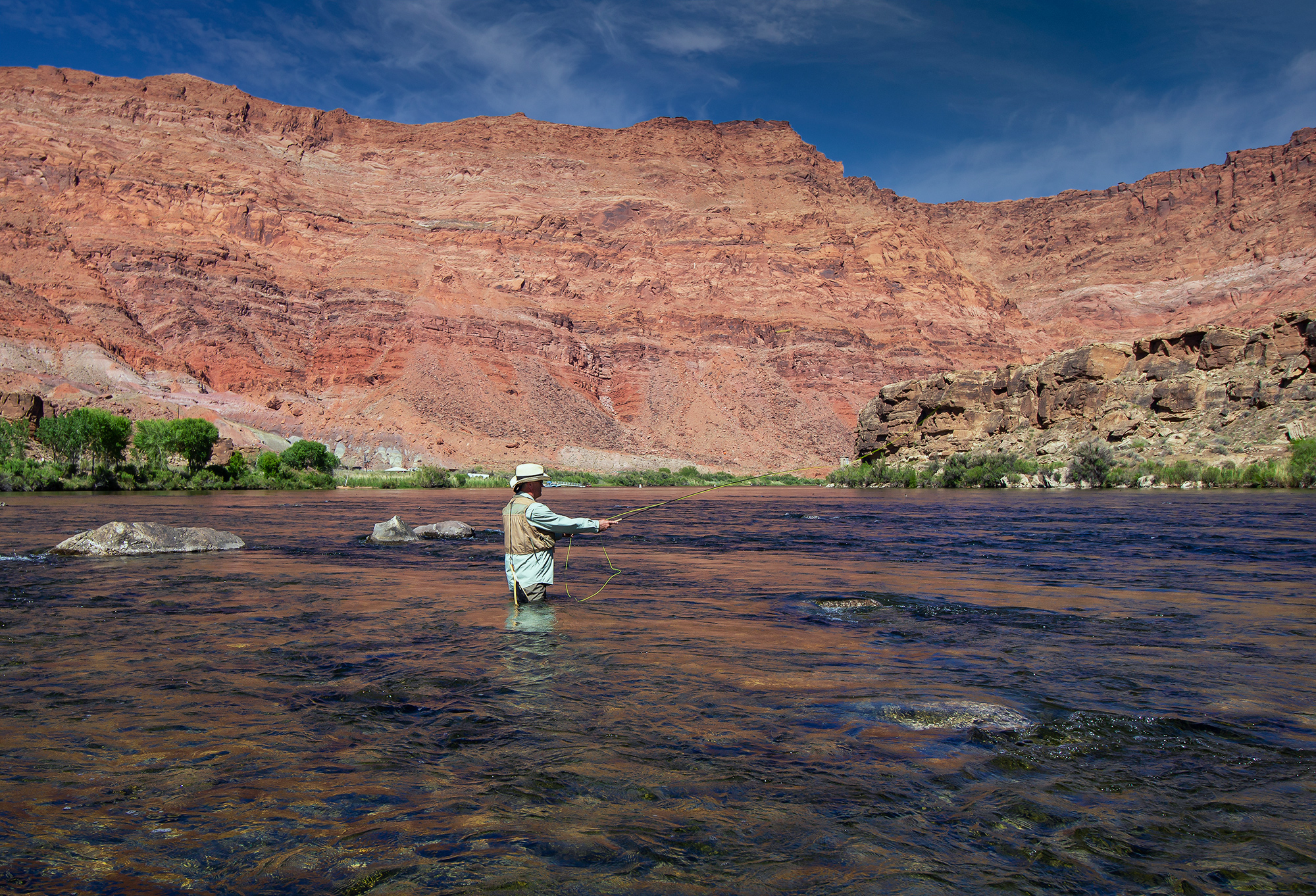
A fisherman at Lee's Ferry on the Colorado River. Here the angler is attempting to catch trout in a place that would be unsuitable for the cold-water fish without the dam upstream.

Tailwaters are also subject to changes in traditional flow rate. Some impoundments discharge a consistent amount of water which can disrupt seasonal fluctuations and extreme flow events. On the other hand, hydropeaking, the cyclical increase in discharge below a hydroelectric dam to meet power demands, can rapidly increase tailwater flow rates. The dramatic changes in river flow can scour the river bottom, change river velocity and depth, and reduce biotic richness in the waterway.

== Tailwater fishery ==
Tailwater can also refer to a type of fishery. Fishing in tailwaters can be very productive due to consistent water temperature and flow rates found below an impoundment. Nutrients from the lake upstream are released into the tailwater, creating a productive environment in which target fish species, usually trout, can thrive. An example of this phenomenon is the fishery at Lee's Ferry on the Colorado River in Arizona.
