= Henryk Niewodniczański =

Polish physicist

- Born: 10 December 1900; Vilna, Russian Empire
- Died: 20 December 1968 (aged 68); Kraków, Poland
- Education: Stefan Batory University
- Scientific career
- Workplaces: Mond Laboratory, Cavendish Laboratory, Adam Mickiewicz University, Stefan Batory University, Jagiellonian University

Henryk Niewodniczański (1900–1968) was a Polish physicist, professor at the Jagiellonian University and the creator and director of the Institute of Nuclear Physics in Kraków.

== Life and career ==
He graduated from the Stefan Batory University in Wilno (Poland) in 1924 and in 1926 received his PhD from the same university. In 1927, he was awarded a fellowship at University of Tübingen. At that time his main field of interest was optics of metals and molecular optics. By studying the influence of the magnetic field on the fluorescence of mercury vapour he discovered magnetic dipole radiation.

In 1934, as a fellow of Rockefeller Foundation, Niewodniczański worked in the Royal Society's Mond Laboratory and in the Cavendish Laboratory in Cambridge.

On his return to Poland in 1937, Niewodniczański worked first at the Adam Mickiewicz University in Poznań and later in Wilno where he was the Chair of Experimental Physics at the Stefan Batory University. After the war he obtained the Chair of Experimental Physics at the Jagiellonian University in Kraków.

His interest in atomic optics and nuclear physics led him to a flourishing development of these branches of physics in Kraków. Niewodniczański was also an excellent organizer. In 1955 he created the Institute of Nuclear Physics, with a Soviet-made U-120 cyclotron as the main research tool.

As the director of the Institute of Nuclear Physics and of the Institute of Physics of the Jagiellonian University, Niewodniczański was the initiator of the majority of the research carried out in these two institutes. He assembled a group of young scientists who, undaunted by difficult conditions, built with him the necessary equipment and under his inspiration began research works.

In 1988, twenty years after his death, the Institute of Nuclear Physics he created was renamed The Henryk Niewodniczanski Institute of Nuclear Physics.

== See also ==
- Institute of Nuclear Physics Polish Academy of Sciences
