= Hans Volker Klapdor-Kleingrothaus =

German physicist (born 1942)

Hans Volker Klapdor-Kleingrothaus (also known as H.V. Klapdor; born 25 January 1942, in Reinbek) is a German physicist who works in nuclear physics, particle physics and astrophysics.

== Biography ==
Klapdor-Kleingrothaus studied physics at the University of Hamburg and received his PhD (Dr. rer. nat.) in 1969 with a thesis on gamma-ray spectroscopy at a particle accelerator. From 1969 until 2007 he worked at the Max Planck Institute for Nuclear Physics in Heidelberg, originally studying heavy ion reactions. He received his habilitation in Hamburg in 1971 and in Heidelberg two years later. He has been a professor at the University of Heidelberg since 1980.

== Important work ==
Klapdor-Kleingrothaus works on nuclear astrophysics and on the study of weak interaction in nuclear physics, in particular on double beta decay. He proposed and was subsequently spokesperson of the Heidelberg-Moscow experiment, which ran from 1990 until 2003 in the Laboratori Nazionali del Gran Sasso, near Rome. A sub-group of the Heidelberg-Moscow experiment claimed first evidence for neutrinoless double beta decay. The full data showed a significance of 6.4 standard deviations. This result could be of fundamental importance for particle physics. If confirmed it would indicate (total) lepton number violation, and provide evidence that the neutrino is a Majorana particle. A half-life of 2.2 10^{25} years was found for the decay of Germanium-76. The result was criticized by some authors and is not widely accepted in the scientific community, because it appears to be refuted by other dark matter experiments. The authors responded to these criticisms in several articles. The discussion was also reported in the media. Independent investigations of background events in the experiment were carried out, but neither confirmed nor excluded Klapdor's result. A recent summary of the status of the Heidelberg-Moscow-experiment can be also found in.

Klapdor-Kleingrothaus also led the HDMS-experiment (Heidelberg Dark Matter Search) to search for dark matter in the Gran Sasso Underground Laboratory from 1999. He was spokesperson of GENIUS, a proposed experiment to search for dark matter and neutrinoless double beta decay. A prototype of this experiment was conducted from 2003 to 2006 at the Gran Sasso Underground Laboratory. He also held several patents on reactor technology as well as one on particle detectors.

== International collaboration ==
Among others, Klapdor-Kleingrothaus stayed at the Los Alamos National Laboratory and the Brookhaven National Laboratory. Furthermore, he had numerous visits and collaborations with the Joint Institute for Nuclear Research (JINR) in Dubna, Russia, and naturally with the Kurchatov Institute in Moscow. He was visiting professor at Osaka, Tokyo and Kyoto, Japan - 1988 as guest of the Japan Society for the Promotion of Science, and at Kyoto 1991 as guest professor at the Yukawa Institute for Fundamental Physics. In 1997 he was again at Osaka by invitation of the Center of Excellence of the Japanese Ministry of Technology.

== Prizes ==
In 1982 Klapdor-Kleingrothaus received the Physics Prize of the German Physical Society together with Wolfgang Hillebrandt. In 1994 he became a member of the New York Academy of Sciences. 1998 and 2005, respectively, he received a physics prize of the JINR in Dubna, Russia for work on "Physics Beyond Standard Model in rare Processes and in Cosmology" and "Looking for SUSY Dark Matter", respectively.

== Conferences ==
Klapdor-Kleingrothaus has organized numerous conferences. The first WEIN conference (Weak and Electromagnetic Interactions in Nuclei), he organized on the occasion of the 600th anniversary of the foundation of the University of Heidelberg in 1986. Follow-up conferences were in Montreal, Dubna, Osaka and Santa Fe. In 1996 he started the Dark Matter in Astro-and Particle Physics Conferences (DARK conferences) in Heidelberg, and organized the following conferences in Cape Town, Sydney and Christchurch. For physics beyond the standard model, a further series of conferences was begun: the Beyond the Desert Conferences, in 1997, 1999 and 2003 in Castle Ringberg, Bavaria, in 2002 in Oulu, Finland, and in 2010 in Cape Town, South Africa.

== Publications ==
He has about 360 scientific publications, 30 books and 6000 citations, according to INSPIRE-HEP.
