= History of the Big Bang theory =

The history of the Big Bang theory began with the Big Bang's development from observations and theoretical considerations. Much of the theoretical work in cosmology now involves extensions and refinements to the basic Big Bang model. The theory itself was originally formalised by Father Georges Lemaître in 1927. Hubble's law of the expansion of the universe provided foundational support for the theory.

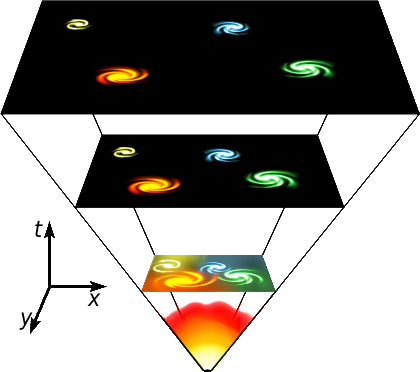
According to the Big Bang model, the universe expanded from an extremely dense and hot state and continues to expand today. A common analogy explains that space itself is expanding, carrying galaxies with it, like spots on an inflating balloon. The graphic scheme above is an artist's concept illustrating the expansion of a portion of a flat universe.

== Philosophy and medieval temporal finitism ==
In medieval philosophy, there was much debate over whether the universe had a finite or infinite past (see Temporal finitism). The philosophy of Aristotle held that the universe had an infinite past, which caused problems for past Jewish and Islamic philosophers who were unable to reconcile the Aristotelian conception of the eternal with the Abrahamic view of creation. As a result, a variety of logical arguments for the universe having a finite past were developed by John Philoponus, Al-Kindi, Saadia Gaon, Al-Ghazali and Immanuel Kant, among others.

English theologian Robert Grosseteste explored the nature of matter and the cosmos in his 1225 treatise De Luce (On Light). He described the birth of the universe in an explosion and the crystallization of matter to form stars and planets in a set of nested spheres around Earth. De Luce is the first attempt to describe the heavens and Earth using a single set of physical laws.

In 1610, Johannes Kepler used the night sky to argue for a finite universe. Seventy-seven years later, Isaac Newton described large-scale motion throughout the universe.

The description of a universe that expanded and contracted cyclically was first put forward in a poem published in 1791 by Erasmus Darwin. Edgar Allan Poe presented a similar cyclic system in his 1848 essay titled Eureka: A Prose Poem; it is obviously not a scientific work, but Poe, while starting from metaphysical principles, tried to explain the universe using contemporary physical and mental knowledge. Ignored by the scientific community and often misunderstood by literary critics, its scientific implications have been reevaluated in recent times.

According to Poe, the initial state of matter was a single "Primordial Particle". "Divine Volition", manifesting itself as a repulsive force, fragmented the Primordial Particle into atoms. Atoms spread evenly throughout space until the repulsive force stops and attraction appears as a reaction; then matter begins to clump together, forming stars and star systems, while the material universe is drawn back together by gravity, finally collapsing and eventually returning to the Primordial Particle stage in order to begin the process of repulsion and attraction once again. This part of Eureka describes a Newtonian evolving universe which shares a number of properties with relativistic models, and for this reason Poe anticipates some themes of modern cosmology.

== Early 20th century scientific developments ==
Observationally, in the 1910s, Vesto Slipher and later, Carl Wilhelm Wirtz, determined that most spiral nebulae (now called spiral galaxies) were receding from Earth. Slipher used spectroscopy to investigate the rotation periods of planets, the composition of planetary atmospheres, and was the first to observe the radial velocities of galaxies. Wirtz observed a systematic redshift of nebulae, which was difficult to interpret in terms of a cosmology in which the universe is filled more or less uniformly with stars and nebulae. They were not aware of the cosmological implications, nor that the supposed nebulae were actually galaxies outside our own Milky Way.

Also in that decade, Albert Einstein's theory of general relativity was found to admit no static cosmological solutions, given the basic assumptions of cosmology described in the Big Bang's theoretical underpinnings. The universe (i.e., the space-time metric) was described by a metric tensor that was either expanding or shrinking (i.e., was not constant or invariant). This result, coming from an evaluation of the field equations of the general theory, at first led Einstein himself to consider that his formulation of the field equations of the general theory may be in error, and he tried to correct it by adding a cosmological constant. This constant would restore to the general theory's description of space-time an invariant metric tensor for the fabric of space/existence. The first person to seriously apply general relativity to cosmology without the stabilizing cosmological constant was Alexander Friedmann. Friedmann derived the expanding-universe solution to general relativity field equations in 1922. Friedmann's 1924 papers included "Über die Möglichkeit einer Welt mit konstanter negativer Krümmung des Raumes" (About the possibility of a world with constant negative curvature) which was published by the Berlin Academy of Sciences on 7 January 1924. Friedmann's equations describe the Friedmann–Lemaitre–Robertson–Walker universe.

In 1927, the Belgian physicist Georges Lemaitre proposed an expanding model for the universe to explain the observed redshifts of spiral nebulae, and calculated the Hubble law. He based his theory on the work of Einstein and De Sitter, and independently derived Friedmann's equations for an expanding universe. Also, the redshifts themselves were not constant, but varied in such a manner as to lead to the conclusion that there was a definite relationship between the amount of redshift of nebulae and their distance from observers.

In 1929, Edwin Hubble provided a comprehensive observational foundation for Lemaitre's theory. Hubble's experimental observations discovered that, relative to the Earth and all other observed bodies, galaxies are receding in every direction at velocities (calculated from their observed redshifts) directly proportional to their distance from the Earth and each other. In 1929, Hubble and Milton Humason formulated the empirical Redshift Distance Law of galaxies, nowadays known as Hubble's law, which, once the Redshift is interpreted as a measure of recession speed, is consistent with the solutions of Einstein's General Relativity Equations for a homogeneous, isotropic expanding universe. The law states that the greater the distance between any two galaxies, the greater their relative speed of separation. In 1929, Edwin Hubble discovered that most of the universe was expanding and moving away from everything else. If everything is moving away from everything else, then it should be thought that everything was once closer together. The logical conclusion is that at some point, all matter started from a single point a few millimetres across before exploding outward. It was so hot that it consisted of only raw energy for hundreds of thousands of years before matter could form. Whatever happened had to unleash an unfathomable force, since the universe is still expanding billions of years later. The theory he devised to explain what he found is called the Big Bang theory.

In 1931, Lemaître proposed in his "hypothèse de l'atome primitif" (hypothesis of the primeval atom) that the universe began with the "explosion" of the "primeval atom" – what was later called the Big Bang. Lemaître first took cosmic rays to be the remnants of the event, although it is now known that they originate within the local galaxy. Lemaître had to wait until shortly before his death to learn of the discovery of cosmic microwave background radiation, the remnant radiation of a dense and hot phase in the early universe.

=== Big Bang vs. steady-state ===
Hubble's law had suggested that the universe was expanding, contradicting the cosmological principle whereby the universe, when viewed on sufficiently large distance scales, has no preferred directions or preferred places. Hubble's idea allowed for two opposing hypotheses to be suggested. One was Lemaître's Big Bang, advocated and developed by George Gamow. The other model was Fred Hoyle's steady-state model, in which new matter would be created as the galaxies moved away from each other. In this model, the universe is roughly the same at any point in time. It was actually Hoyle who coined the name of Lemaître's theory, referring to it as "this 'big bang' idea" during a radio broadcast on 28 March 1949, on BBC's Third Programme. It is popularly reported that Hoyle, who favored an alternative "steady-state" cosmological model, intended this to be pejorative, but Hoyle explicitly denied this and said it was just a striking image meant to highlight the difference between the two models. Hoyle repeated the term in further broadcasts in early 1950, as part of a series of five lectures entitled The Nature of the Universe. The text of each lecture was published in The Listener a week after the broadcast, the first time that the term "big bang" appeared in print. As evidence in favour of the Big Bang model mounted, and the consensus became widespread, Hoyle himself, albeit somewhat reluctantly, admitted to it by formulating a new cosmological model that other scientists later referred to as the "steady Bang".

== 1950 to 1990s ==
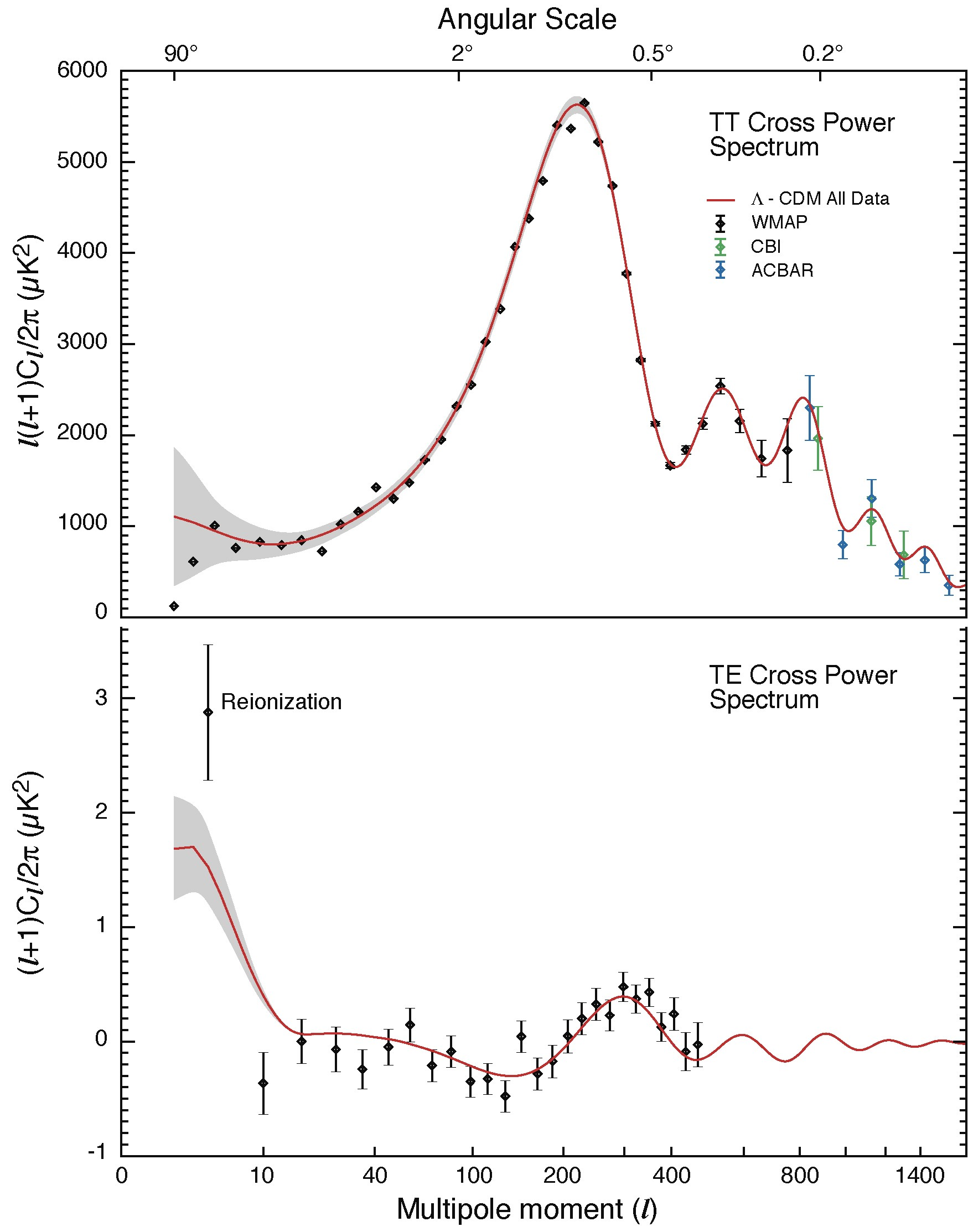
Comparison of the predictions of the standard Big Bang model with experimental measurements. The power spectrum of the cosmic microwave background radiation anisotropy is plotted in terms of the angular scale (or multipole moment) (top).

From around 1950 to 1965, the support for these theories was evenly divided, with a slight imbalance arising from the fact that the Big Bang theory could explain both the formation and the observed abundances of hydrogen and helium, whereas the steady-state model could explain how they were formed, but not why they should have the observed abundances. However, the observational evidence began to support the idea that the universe evolved from a hot, dense state. Objects such as quasars and radio galaxies were observed to be much more common at large distances (therefore in the distant past) than in the nearby universe, whereas the steady-state model predicted that the average properties of the universe should be unchanging with time. In addition, the discovery of the cosmic microwave background radiation in 1964 was considered the death knell of the steady-state model, although this prediction was only qualitative and failed to predict the exact temperature of the CMB. (The key Big Bang prediction is the black-body spectrum of the CMB, which was not measured with high accuracy until COBE in 1990). After some reformulation, the Big Bang has been regarded as the best theory of the origin and evolution of the cosmos. Before the late 1960s, many cosmologists thought the infinitely dense and physically paradoxical singularity at the starting time of Friedmann's cosmological model could be avoided by allowing for a universe which was contracting before entering the hot dense state, and starting to expand again. This was formalized as Richard Tolman's oscillating universe. In the sixties, Stephen Hawking and others demonstrated that this idea was unworkable,, and the singularity is an essential feature of the physics described by Einstein's gravity. This led the majority of cosmologists to accept the notion that the universe as currently described by the physics of general relativity has a finite age. However, due to a lack of a theory of quantum gravity, there is no way to say whether the singularity is an actual origin point for the universe, or whether the physical processes that govern the regime cause the universe to be effectively eternal in character.

Through the 1970s and 1980s, most cosmologists accepted the Big Bang, but several puzzles remained, including the non-discovery of anisotropies in the CMB, and occasional observations hinting at deviations from a black-body spectrum; thus the theory was not very strongly confirmed.

== 1990 onwards ==
Huge advances in Big Bang cosmology were made in the 1990s and the early 21st century, as a result of major advances in telescope technology in combination with large amounts of satellite data, such as COBE, the Hubble Space Telescope and WMAP.

In 1990, measurements from the COBE satellite showed that the spectrum of the CMB matches a 2.725 K black-body to very high precision; deviations do not exceed 2 parts in 100000. This showed that earlier claims of spectral deviations were incorrect, and essentially proved that the universe was hot and dense in the past, since no other known mechanism can produce a black body to such high accuracy. Further observations from COBE in 1992 discovered the very small anisotropies of the CMB on large scales, approximately as predicted from Big Bang models with dark matter. From then on, models of non-standard cosmology without some form of Big Bang became very rare in the mainstream astronomy journals.

In 1998, measurements of distant supernovae indicated that the expansion of the universe is accelerating, and this was supported by other observations including ground-based CMB observations and large galaxy redshift surveys. In 1999–2000, the Boomerang and Maxima balloon-borne CMB observations showed that the geometry of the universe is close to flat; then in 2001 the 2dFGRS galaxy redshift survey estimated the mean matter density around 25–30 percent of critical density.

From 2001 to 2010, NASA's WMAP spacecraft took very detailed pictures of the universe by means of the cosmic microwave background radiation. The images can be interpreted to indicate that the universe is 13.7 billion years old (within one percent error) and that the Lambda-CDM model and the inflationary theory are correct. No other cosmological theory can yet explain such a wide range of observed parameters, from the ratio of the elemental abundances in the early universe to the structure of the cosmic microwave background, the observed higher abundance of active galactic nuclei in the early universe and the observed masses of clusters of galaxies.

In 2013 and 2015, ESA's Planck spacecraft released even more detailed images of the cosmic microwave background, showing consistency with the Lambda-CDM model to still higher precision.

Much of the current work in cosmology includes understanding how galaxies form in the context of the Big Bang, understanding what happened in the earliest times after the Big Bang, and reconciling observations with the basic theory. Cosmologists continue to calculate many of the parameters of the Big Bang to a new level of precision, and carry out more detailed observations which are hoped to provide clues to the nature of dark energy and dark matter, and to test the theory of General Relativity on cosmic scales.

== See also ==
- Theory of everything
- Timeline of cosmological theories
