= Spectral line ratios =

The analysis of line intensity ratios is an important tool to obtain information about laboratory and space plasmas. In emission spectroscopy, the intensity of spectral lines can provide various information about the plasma (or gas) condition. It might be used to determine the temperature or density of the plasma. Since the measurement of an absolute intensity in an experiment can be challenging, the ratio of different spectral line intensities can be used to achieve information about the plasma, as well.

== Theory ==
The emission intensity density of an atomic transition from the upper state to the lower state is:

$$P_{u \rightarrow l} = N_u  \ \hbar \omega_{u \rightarrow l} \  A_{u \rightarrow l}$$

where:

- $N_u$ is the density of ions in the upper state,
- $\hbar \omega_{u \rightarrow l}$ is the energy of the emitted photon, which is the product of the Planck constant and the transition frequency,
- $A_{u \rightarrow l}$ is the Einstein coefficient for the specific transition.

The population of atomic states N is generally dependent on plasma temperature and density. Generally, the more hot and dense the plasma, the more the higher atomic states are populated. The observance or not-observance of spectral lines from certain ion species can, therefore, help to give a rough estimation of the plasma parameters.

More accurate results can be obtained by comparing line intensities:

$$\frac{P_{u_1 \rightarrow l_1}}{P_{u_2 \rightarrow l_2}} = \frac{N_{u_1}  \omega_{u_1 \rightarrow l_1} A_{u_1 \rightarrow l_1} }{N_{u_2}  \omega_{u_2 \rightarrow l_2} A_{u_2 \rightarrow l_2}}$$

The transition frequencies and the Einstein coefficients of transitions are well known and listed in various tables as in NIST Atomic Spectra Database. It is often that atomic modeling is required for determination of the population densities $N_{u_1}$ and $N_{u_2}$ as a function of density and temperature. While for the temperature determination of plasma in thermal equilibrium Saha's equation and Boltzmann's formula might be used, the density dependence usually requires atomic modeling.

== See also ==
- Plasma diagnostics
- Spectral line
