= Helmholtz flow =

Helmholtz flow is a term used in fluid mechanics for flow with free streamlines or vortex sheets.

== See also ==
- Kelvin–Helmholtz instability
