= Ronald F. Probstein =

American engineer (1928–2021)

- Born: March 11, 1928; New York City
- Died: September 19, 2021 (aged 93)
- Education: New York University; Princeton University
- Engineering career
- Discipline: Mechanical Engineering
- Employer: Massachusetts Institute of Technology
- Awards: American Academy of Arts and Sciences; US National Academy of Engineering; US National Academy of Sciences

Ronald F. Probstein (March 11, 1928 – September 19, 2021) was the Ford Professor of Engineering, Emeritus, at the Massachusetts Institute of Technology (MIT). He played a principal role in spacecraft and ballistic missile reentry physics and design, hypersonic flight theory, comet behavior, desalination and synthetic fuels.

== Biography ==
Probstein was born in New York City on March 11, 1928. He graduated from Stuyvesant High School and studied engineering at New York City’s night school, while at the same time working during the day for mathematician Richard Courant. In 1952, he received the first Ph.D. from the Princeton University Department of Aeronautical Engineering. In 1954, he accepted a joint appointment at Brown University in the Division of Applied Mathematics and Division of Engineering and was given tenure two years later. He accepted a position as a Professor of Mechanical Engineering at MIT in 1962, and remained there becoming Ford Professor of Engineering until his retirement in 1996, when he became Emeritus.

Together with Wallace D. Hayes he wrote the book Hypersonic Inviscid Flow which remains a principal source of basic information on hypersonic flow theory. He applied and generalized these theoretical developments to the design of early American spacecraft and ballistic missiles to enable their reentry into the Earth’s atmosphere without destruction from the high temperatures generated by their hypersonic speeds.

In the late 1960s, he developed a theory that predicted the appearance of the fan-shaped tails that appear behind dusty comets.

In the early 1970s, he turned his attention to the desalination of salt water and purification of contaminated water.

In 1982, he co-authored Synthetic Fuels as a unified and coherent subject. It is the first, and still the only, book providing the underlying principles and possible means for producing fuels to replace natural ones.

In the 1990s, he introduced the concept of electrokinetic soil remediation. His basic procedure was patented and licensed to an industrial firm for further development and today the subject has become one that is widely studied and applied worldwide. The scientific basis is outlined in his book on Physicochemical Hydrodynamics: An Introduction, which is a discipline concerned with the interaction between fluid flow and physical, chemical, and biochemical processes.

In 2009, he wrote his first book for a general audience - Honest Sid: Memoir of a Gambling Man, published by iUniverse. The book follows the adventures of his father in the world of bookies and bettors, fighters and fixers, set against the often-romanticized backdrop of Depression-era New York City.

He has been honored by election to the United States National Academy of Sciences, the National Academy of Engineering, the American Academy of Arts and Sciences, the International Academy of Astronautics, and awarded an honorary doctorate from Brown University. He has received many awards including a Guggenheim Fellowship. He recently served on the Committee on America’s Energy Future of the United States National Research Council.

Probstein died on September 19, 2021, at the age of 93.

== Bibliography of selected works ==
- Probstein, Ronald F.; Hayes, Wallace D. (1959). Hypersonic inviscid flow, 2004 reprint. Mineola, N.Y.: Dover Publications. ISBN 978-0486432816.
- R.F. Probstein and R. E. Hicks (1982). Synthetic Fuels. McGraw-Hill, Inc. ISBN 0-07-050908-5.
- Probstein, Ronald F. (1994). Physicochemical Hydrodynamics: An Introduction. Hoboken, NJ: Wiley-Interscience. ISBN 978-0-471-45830-2.
- Probstein, Ronald F. (2003). Physicochemical hydrodynamics : an introduction (2nd ed.). Hoboken (New Jersey): Wiley-Interscience. ISBN 978-0471458302.
- Probstein, Ronald (2009). Honest Sid: memoirs of a gambling man. Bloomington, IN: iUniverse. ISBN 9781440141874.
