= Institute of Nuclear Physics of the Polish Academy of Sciences =

Polish research institute

Henryk Niewodniczański Institute of Nuclear Physics Polish Academy of Sciences
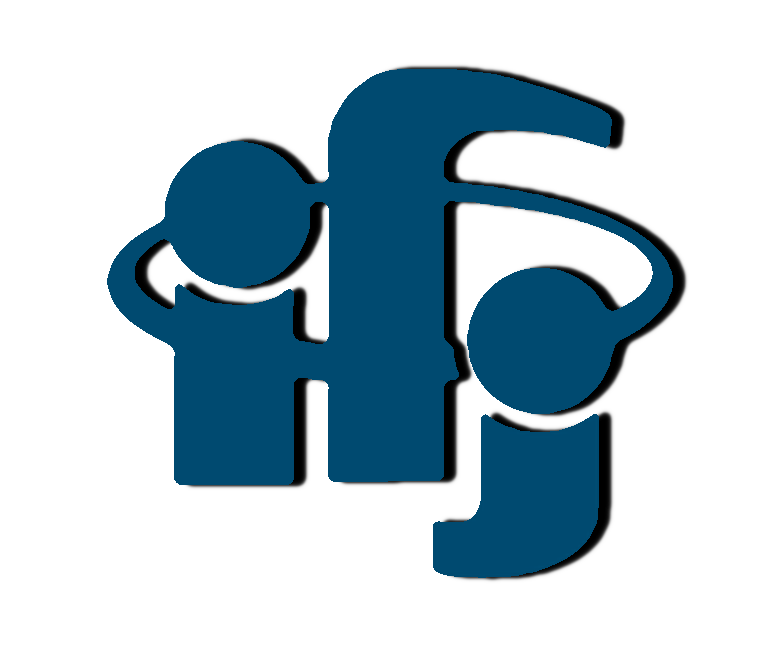
- Formation: 1955
- Founder: Henryk Niewodniczański
- Location: Kraków, Poland
- Coordinates: 50°05′21.2″N 19°53′25.0″E
- Website: www.ifj.edu.pl

The Henryk Niewodniczański Institute of Nuclear Physics Polish Academy of Sciences is a research center in the field of nuclear physics of the Polish Academy of Sciences, located in Kraków. It was founded in 1955 by Henryk Niewodniczański. In 1988 the institute was named after Niewodniczański. The co-founder of the Institute was Marian Mięsowicz. The institute conducts research in four main areas:

- Astrophysics and particle physics,
- Nuclear physics and strong interactions,
- Condensed matter (including nano-materials),
- Interdisciplinary and applied research, which involves applications of physics in medicine, biology, dosimetry, environmental protection, nuclear geophysics, radiochemistry, high-temperature plasma diagnostics, the study of complex systems, such as the human brain, econophysics or linguistics.

== See also ==
- Cosmic-Ray Extremely Distributed Observatory
