= Henry Hemmendinger =

American color scientist

Henry Hemmendinger (April 1, 1915 – August 16, 2003) was an American color scientist.

== Early career ==
Hemmendinger's work in color standardization and measurement established him as one of the world's preeminent experts in color science. After graduating from Harvard and Princeton, Hemmendinger joined the U.S. Navy and worked in submarine warfare research. During his service, he met his future business partner Hugh Davidson. After the war, both men worked in general physics at General Aniline & Film Corporation, where they became increasingly interested in colorimetry and color theory. Their first contribution to the field was their development of the Automatic Tristimulus Integrator, the first device to enable rapid automatic measurement of XYZ values of the color spectrum.

== Development of color-matching computers ==
In 1952 Hemmendinger and Davidson left General Aniline & Film to form Davidson and Hemmendinger. Their first successful product was a colorant-mixture analog computer, COMIC, introduced in 1958, the first automated color matching system. Hemmendinger also evaluated colors for the Munsell books, and his contributions are still used as standards.

In 1967, Hemmendinger and Davidson developed COMIC II, a digital version of their earlier color matching computer. Shortly after this, their company was sold to Kollmorgen and combined with their Macbeth Instrument Development Laboratories. Hemmendinger left Kollmorgen in 1970 and formed the Hemmendinger Color Laboratory, a consulting firm specializing in colorimetric and spectrophotometric standards.

== Contributions to the field ==
Hemmendinger received the Godlove Award from the Inter-Society Color Council for his work, and frequently consulted with the National Bureau of Standards. His companies were frequently the only U.S. supplier of calibrated color materials used to evaluate color measurement instruments.

=== Selected publications ===
- Hemmendinger, H.; Lambert, J. M. (April 1953). "The importance of chromaticity in the evaluation of whiteness". J. Am. Oil Chem. Soc. 30 (4). doi:10.1007/BF02640992.
- Ingle, G. W.; Stockton, F. D.; Hemmendinger, H.; Davidson, Hugh (September 1962). "Analytic Comparison of Color-Difference Equations". J. Opt. Soc. Am. 52 (9): 1075–1076. doi:10.1364/JOSA.52.001075.
- Hemmendinger, H.; Johnston, R. M. (March 1969). "A goniospectrophotemer for color measurements". COLOR.
- Hemmendinger, H. (March 1970). "The development of color-difference formulas". Journal of Paint Technology. 42 (542): 132–139.
- Hemmendinger, H. (Summer 1978). "Enhancement of chroma by the design of illuminants". Color Research and Application. 3 (2): 89–92. doi:10.1002/col.5080030209.
- Hemmendinger, H. (February 1999). "The role of opponency in Twentieth Century colorimetry". Color Research and Application. 24 (1): 6–9. doi:10.1002/(SICI)1520-6378(199902)24:1<6::AID-COL4>3.0.CO;2-M.
