= Hans Breuer (physicist) =

German physicist (1933–2020)

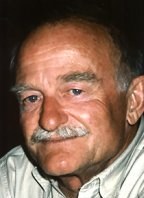
- Breuer in 1996
- Born: Hans Adolf Breuer; 22 October 1933; Frankfurt, Germany
- Died: 19 April 2020 (aged 86); Somerset West, South Africa
- Occupations: Professor, lecturer, author
- Spouse: Rosemarie Berg (m. 1967)
- Children: 3

Academic background
- Education: Max-Planck-Institute
- Thesis: A Range-Energy-Relation for Fast Electrons (1958); Spectrum of Photo Neutrons from Lead (1962)

Academic work
- Discipline: Physics
- Sub-discipline: Nuclear physics

Dr. Hans Adolf Breuer (22 October 1933 in Frankfurt, Germany – 19 April 2020 in Somerset West, South Africa) was a German physicist and author of 23 mainly scientific books.

== Life ==
Hans Adolf Breuer was born in Frankfurt and grew up in Berlin. After finishing school with Abitur, he studied physics in Berlin and later Frankfurt, gaining a Diplom in July 1958 (summa cum laude, thesis: A Range-Energy-Relation for Fast Electrons).

He was a scientist at the Max-Planck-Institute for Biophysics in Frankfurt, where he received a Dr. phil. nat. (PhD) degree in February 1962 (cum laude, thesis: Spectrum of Photo Neutrons from Lead).

Between May 1962 and April 1964, he studied medicine at the Universities of Innsbruck and Tübingen as a fellow of the Studienstiftung. From May 1964 until April 1965, he was a postdoctoral researcher at the Linac in Saskatoon, Canada.

In July 1966, he worked as a scientist at the Technical University Darmstadt. In 1967, he was married to Rosemarie Berg and accepted the position of assistant professor for physics at the University of Saskatchewan, where his first son was born.

He was granted tenure in June 1969 but moved to Pennsylvania, US, as associate professor for physics at the then-California State College, receiving tenure in 1971. In 1970, his second son was born.

From August 1971 until October 1976, he lived as an independent author on board the 60 feet (18 m) sailing yacht Kajen. From September 1976 to December 1976, he was a visiting professor at the Max-Planck-Institute for biophysics in Frankfurt and then became scientific officer (P4) at the International Atomic Energy Agency, Vienna. In Vienna, his third son was born.

In October 1981, the family emigrated to Stellenbosch, South Africa, where he accepted the position of principal scientist at the National Accelerator Center in Faure. He also lectured physics for life science students at the University of Cape Town.

From January 1985 to December 1989, he was a consultant at the medical school of the University of Cape Town, and since 1991 he has been an honorary lecturer at the medical faculty of the University of Cape Town.

Together with his sons, Hans Breuer created a proton therapy planning program in 1993.

Hans Breuer died on 19 April 2020 in Somerset West, South Africa, aged 86.

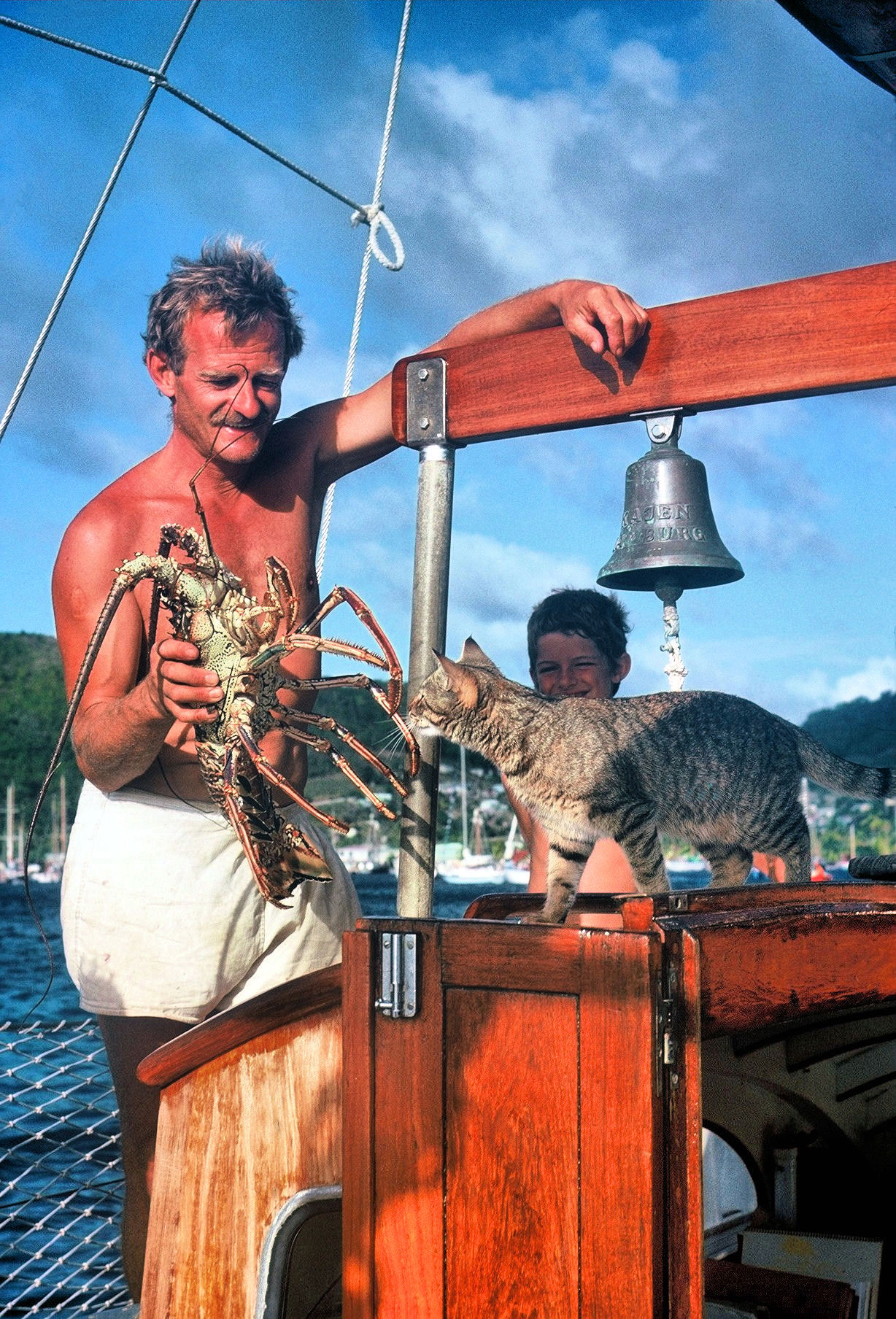
Breuer with his son and a cat (name unknown) in the 1970s

== Publications ==
- Dictionary for Computer Languages, Academic Press, London 1966
- Experiments in Modern Physics, University of Saskatchewan Press, Saskatoon, Canada, 1968
- Fortran-Fibel, Bibliographisches Institut, Mannheim, Germany, 1969
- Algol-Fibel, BI, Mannheim, Germany, 1973
- PL1-Fibel, BI, Mannheim, Germany, 1973
- Physics for Life Science Students, Prentice-Hall, Englewood Cliffs, USA, 1975
- Taschenwörterbuch der Programmiersprachen Algol, Fortran, PL1, BI, Mannheim, Germany, 1976
- Physik für Mediziner und Naturwissenschaftler, Thieme Verlag, Stuttgart, and DTV, Munich, Germany, 1978
- Gebrauchsmathematik: Adaptation and Translation of Clifford Swartz, Used Math, DTV, Munich, Germany 1979
- Entdeckt-Erforscht-Entwickelt, Vol 1, DTV, Munich, 1981
- Atlas zur Chemie, Allgemeine und Anorganische Chemie, DTV, Munich 1981. 10th edition 2004, translated into 9 languages
- Atlas zur Chemie, Organische Chemie, DTV, Munich, 1983 9th edition 2000, translated into 9 languages. Voted One Of The Best Scientific Books of 1983 by the Börsenverein des Deutschen Buchhandels
- Entdeckt-Erforscht-Entwickelt, Vol.2, DTV, Munich, 1983
- ..., Klaus Breuer, Die Basic Fibel, BI-Wissenschaftsverlag, Mannheim, Germany, 1986
- Atlas zur Physik, Vol 1, DTV, Munich, 1987. 7th edition 2004, translated into 7 languages
- Atlas zur Physik, Vol 2, DTV, Munich 1988. 6th edition 2005, translated into 7 languages
- Taschenatlas Physik für Mediziner, Springer-Lehrbuch, Springer, Heidelberg, 1989
- G.G. Jaros, ... : Physics and Chemistry for Nurses, Butterworth, Durban, South Africa, 1990.
- Atlas zur Informatik, DTV, Munich, Germany, 1995
- G.G. Jaros, ... : Physics and Chemistry for Health Care Professionals, Heinemann, Johannesburg, South Africa, 1997
- ..., B. Smit : Proton Therapy and Radio surgery, Springer, Heidelberg, 2000
- Translation of: Handbook of Lasers in Medicine, Springer, Heidelberg, 2000
- Marokko, Kurt Schröder Verlag, Bonn, Germany, 1963, revised edition 1972´
- Kolumbus war Chinese - Entdeckungen und Erfindungen im Fernen Osten, Societäts Verlag, Frankfurt, Germany, 1970, 2.edition 1972, Bookclub 1971. English edition: Herder&Herder, New York, 1972, Pocket ed. DTV, 1979
