= Hidetsugu Ikegami =

Japanese physicist

Hidetsugu Ikegami is a Japanese physicist. He is Professor Emeritus of Nuclear Physics at Osaka University, where he has been director of the Research Center for Nuclear Physics (RCNP) and organized and chaired international symposia.

He founded the RCNP ring cyclotron facilities. Hidetsugu Ikegami is guest professor at Uppsala University. On June 1, 1990, Ikegami received an honorary doctorate from the Faculty of Mathematics and Science at Uppsala University, Sweden

He has submitted numerous patent applications many of his more recent applications pertaining to nuclear fusion.
