= Heat loss due to linear thermal bridging =

Used to calculate the energy performance of buildings

The heat loss due to linear thermal bridging ($H_{TB}$) is a physical quantity used when calculating the energy performance of buildings. It appears in both United Kingdom and Irish methodologies.

== Calculation ==
The calculation of the heat loss due to linear thermal bridging is relatively simple, given by the formula below:

$$H_{TB} = y \sum A_{exp}$$

In the formula, $y = 0.08$ if Accredited Construction details used, and $y = 0.15$ otherwise, and $\sum A_{exp}$ is the sum of all the exposed areas of the building envelope,
