= Undular bore =

Atmospheric wave disturbance

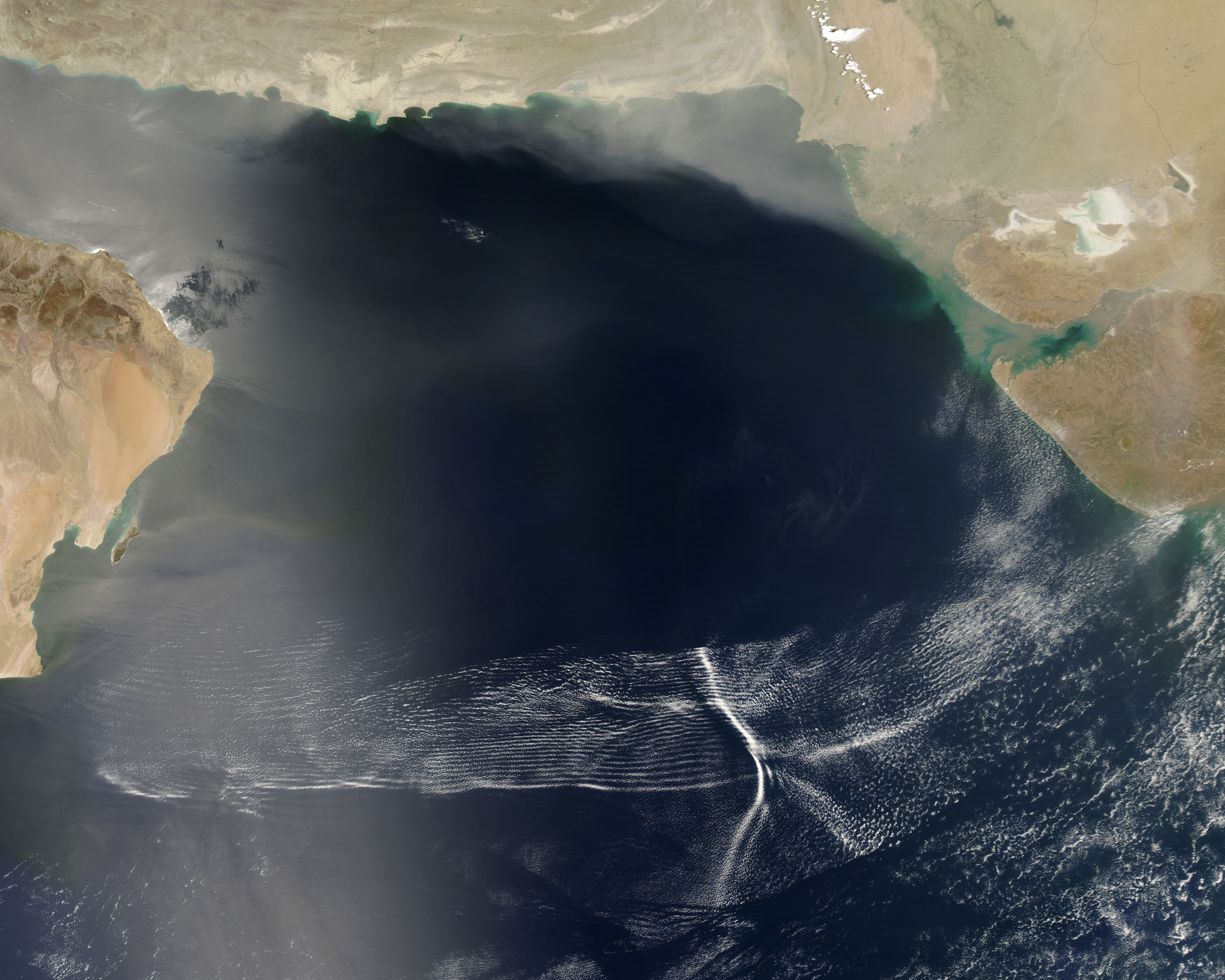
Image of a likely undular bore wave

In meteorology, an undular bore is a wave disturbance in the Earth's atmosphere and can be seen through unique cloud formations. They normally occur within an area of the atmosphere which is stable in the low levels after an outflow boundary or a cold front moves through.

In hydraulics, an undular bore is a gentle bore with an undular hydraulic jump pattern at the downstream (subcritical) side.

== In meteorology ==
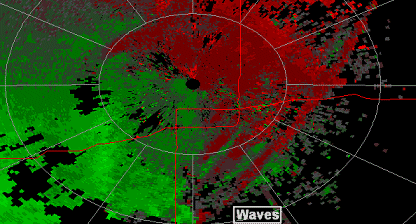
NEXRAD radar image of undular bore wave

=== Overview ===
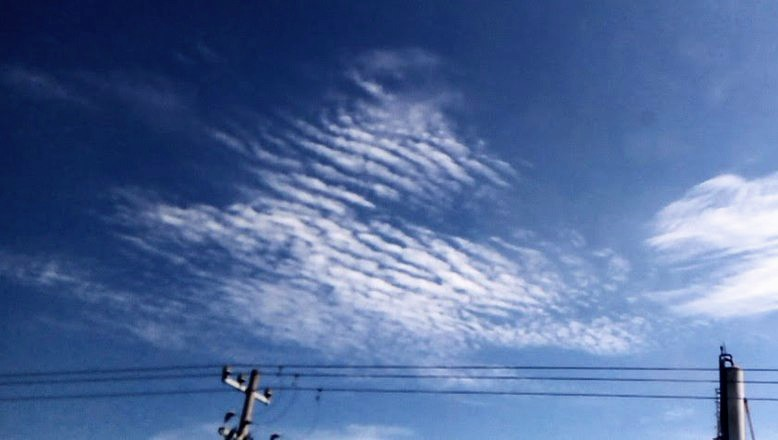
View of a small undular bore from Earth

Undular bores are usually formed when two air masses of different temperatures collide. When a low level boundary such as a cold front or outflow boundary approaches a layer of cold, stable air, it creates a disturbance in the atmosphere producing a wave-like motion, known as a gravity wave. Although the undular bore waves appear as bands of clouds across the sky, they are transverse waves, and are propelled by the transfer of energy from an oncoming storm and are shaped by gravity. The ripple-like appearance of this wave is described as the disturbance in the water when a pebble is dropped into a pond or when a moving boat creates waves in the surrounding water. The object displaces the water or medium the wave is travelling through and the medium moves in an upward motion. However, because of gravity, the water or medium is pulled back down and the repetition of this cycle creates the transverse wave motion.

The undular bore's wavelength can measure 5 miles (8.0 km) peak to peak and can travel 16 kilometres per hour (9.9 mph) to 95 kilometres per hour (59 mph). The medium it travels through is the atmosphere. There are several varying types of ‘‘bores’’ in different layers of the atmosphere, such as the mesospheric bore which occurs in the mesosphere.

=== Occurrences ===
Rare but not unknown in a great many locations, the waves appear with some predictability and regularity in the Gulf of Carpentaria during spring. They have been seen as frequently as six days in a row according to reports by the two pilots who have most experience with soaring these sometimes enormous examples of the undular bore, known in Australia as the Morning Glory cloud.

== In hydraulics ==
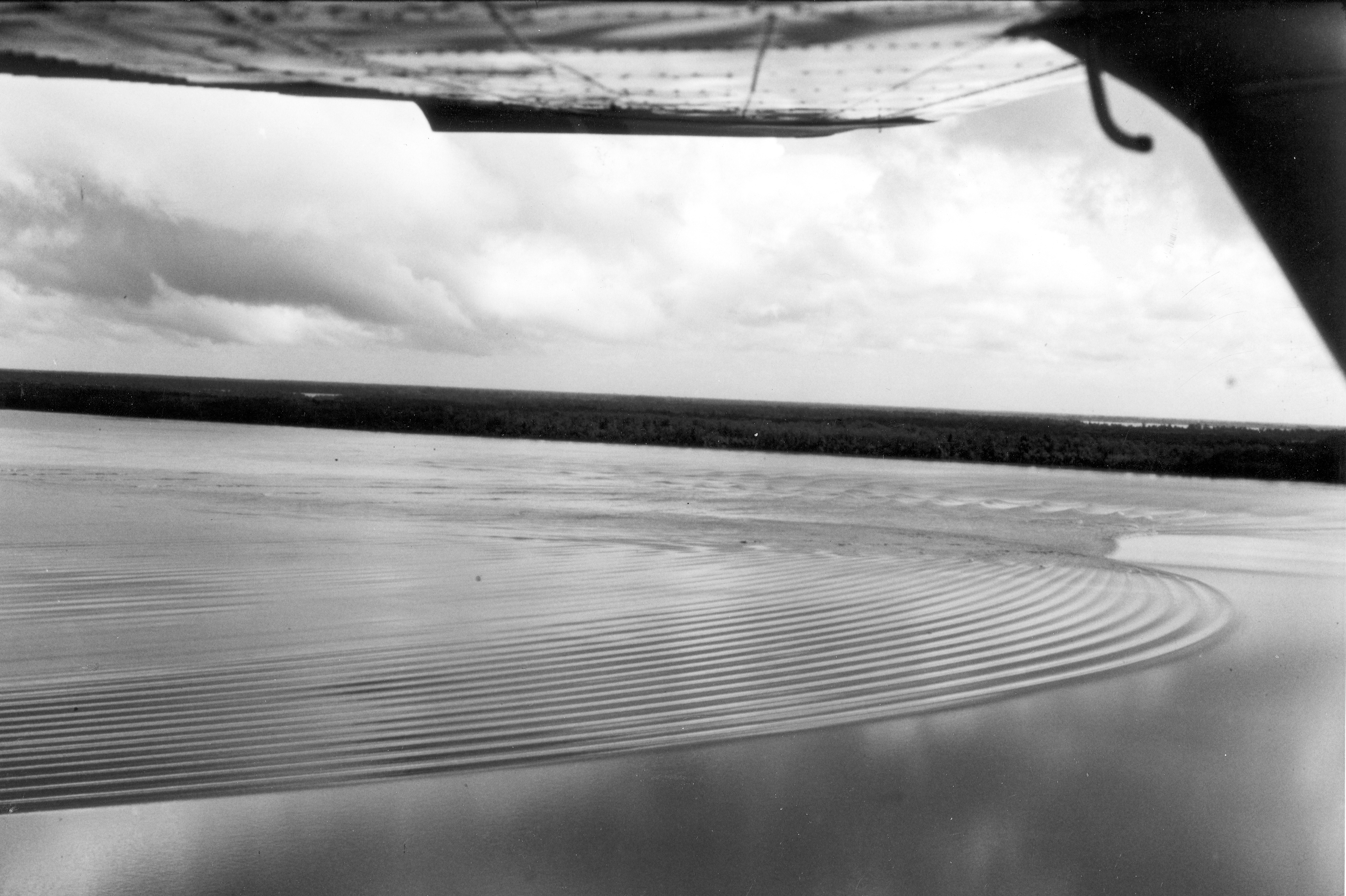
Undular bore and whelps near the mouth of Araguari River in north-eastern Brazil. View is oblique toward mouth from airplane at approximately 30 m (100 ft) altitude.

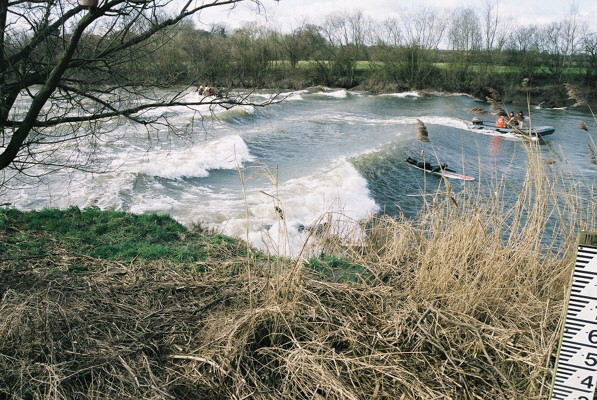
Undular character of the Severn bore near Over Bridge on 9 March 2005.

The term "bore" is also used to describe positive surges advancing in shallow waters. When the surge's Froude number is less than 1.4 to 1.7 (i.e. above unity and below a number somewhere in the range 1.4 to 1.7), the advancing front is followed by a train of well-defined free-surface undulations (called "whelps"). The surge is then called an undular surge or undular bore.

The undulations form a standing wave pattern, relative to the undular bore front. So, the phase velocity (propagation velocity relative to still water) of the undulations is just high enough to keep the undulations stationary relative to the bore front. Now, in water waves, the group velocity (which is also the energy-transport velocity) is less than the phase velocity. Therefore, on average, wave energy of the undulations is transported away from the front, and contributing to the energy loss in the region of the front.

A related occurrence of positive surges is the tidal bore in estuaries.

== See also ==
- Altostratus undulatus cloud
- Derecho
- Gravity wave
- Haboob
- Hydraulic jump
- Morning Glory cloud
- Tidal bore
