= Montana flume =

Popular modification of standard Parshall flume

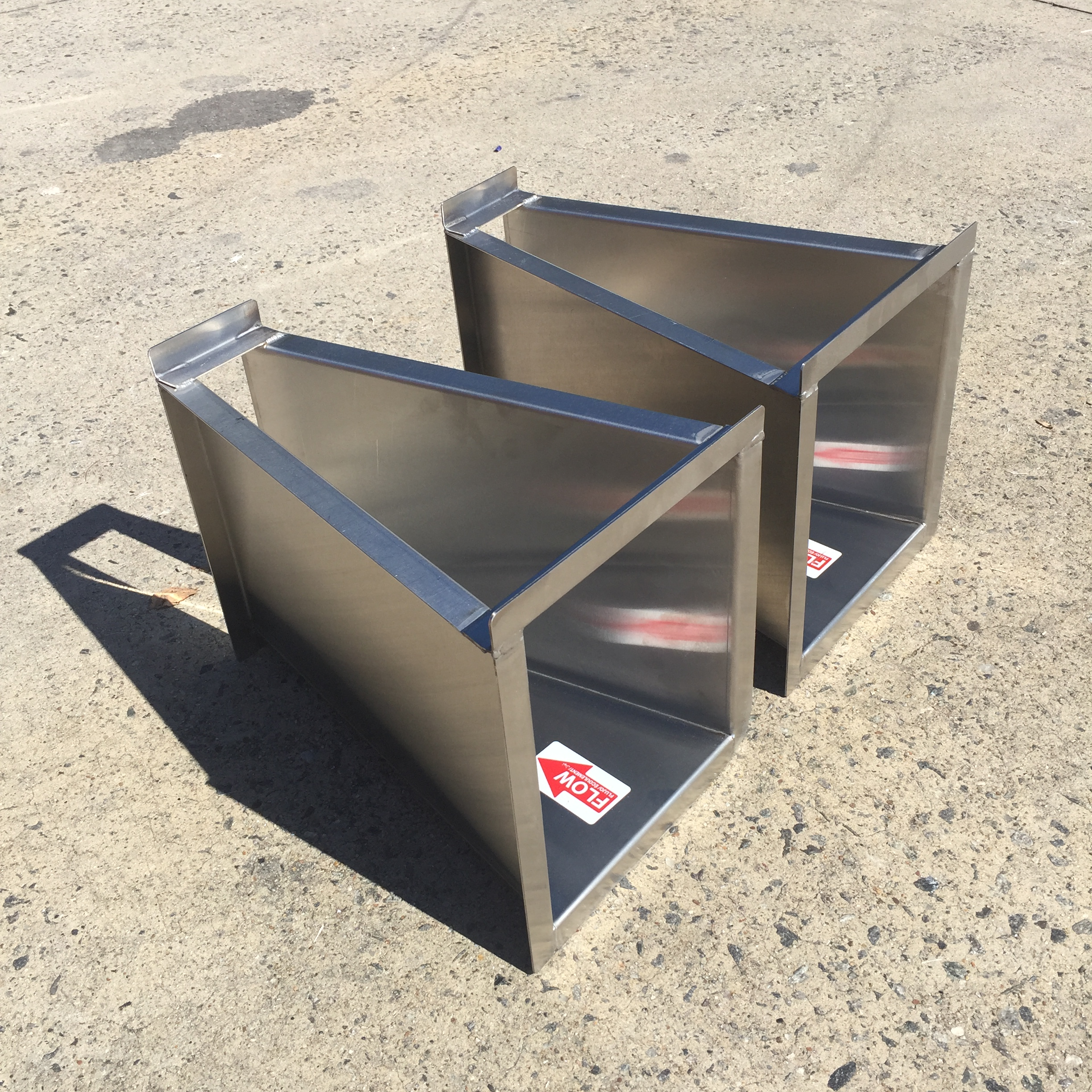
3-Inch stainless steel Montana Flumes

A Montana flume is a popular modification of the standard Parshall flume. The Montana flume removes the throat and discharge sections of the Parshall flume, resulting a flume that is lighter in weight, shorter in length, and less costly to manufacture. Montana flumes are used to measure surface waters, irrigations flows, industrial discharges, and wastewater treatment plant flows.

As a short-throated flume, the Montana flume has a single, specified point of measurement in the contracting section at which the level is measured. The Montana flume is described in US Bureau of Reclamation's Water Measurement Manual and two technical standards MT199127AG and MT199128AG by Montana State University.

As a modification of the Parshall flume, the design of the Montana flume is standardized under ASTM D1941, ISO 9826:1992, and JIS B7553-1993. The flumes are not patented and the discharge tables are not copyright protected.

A total of 22 standard sizes of Montana flumes have been developed, covering flow ranges from 0.005 cfs [0.1416 L/s] to 3,280 cfs [92,890 L/s].

Lacking the extended throat and discharge sections of the Parshall flume, Montana flumes are not intended for use under submerged conditions. Where submergence is possible, a full length Parshall flume should be used. Should submergence occur, investigations have been made into correcting the flow.

Under laboratory conditions the Parshall flume - upon which the Montana is based - can be expected to exhibit accuracies to within +/-2%, although field conditions make accuracies better than 5% doubtful.

== Free-Flow Characteristics ==
The Montana Flume is a restriction with free-spilling discharge that accelerates flow from a sub-critical state (Fr~0.5) to a supercritical one (Fr>1).

The free-flow discharge can be summarized as

$$Q = C H_a^n$$

Where

- Q is flow rate
- C is the free-flow coefficient for the flume
- H_{a} is the head at the primary point of measurement
- n varies with flume size (See Table 1 below)

Montana flume discharge table for free flow conditions:

Throat Width	Coefficient (C)	Exponent (n)
1 in	.338	1.55
2 in	.676	1.55
3 in	.992	1.55
6 in	2.06	1.58
9 in	3.07	1.53
1 ft	3.95	1.55
1.5 ft	6.00	1.54
2 ft	8.00	1.55
3 ft	12.00	1.57
4 ft	16.00	1.58
5 ft	20.00	1.59
6 ft	24.00	1.59
7 ft	28.00	1.60
8 ft	32.00	1.61
10 ft	39.38	1.60
12 ft	46.75	1.60
15 ft	57.81	1.60
20 ft	76.25	1.60
25 ft	94.69	1.60
30 ft	113.13	1.60
40 ft	150.00	1.60
50 ft	186.88	1.60

== Free-Flow vs. Submerged Flow ==
Free-Flow – when there is no “back water” to restrict flow through a flume. Only the single depth (primary point of measurement -Ha) needs to be measured to calculate the flow rate. A free flow also induces a hydraulic jump downstream of the flume.

Submerged Flow – when the water surface downstream of the flume is high enough to restrict flow through a flume, the flume is deemed to be submerged. Lacking the extended throat and discharge sections of the Parshall flume, the Montana flume has little resistance to the effects of submergence and as such it should be avoided. Where submerged flow is or may become present, there are several methods of correcting the situation: the flume may be raised above the channel floor, the downstream channel may be modified, or a different flume type may be used (typically a Parshall flume). Although commonly thought of as occurring at higher flow rates, submerged flow can exist at any flow level as it is a function of downstream conditions. In natural stream applications, submerged flow is frequently the result of vegetative growth on the downstream channel banks, sedimentation, or subsidence of the flume.

== Construction ==
Montana flumes can be constructed from a variety of materials:

- Fiberglass (wastewater applications due to its corrosion resistance)
- Stainless steel (applications involving high temperatures / corrosive flow streams)
- Galvanized steel (water rights / irrigation)
- Concrete
- Aluminum (portable applications)
- Wood (temporary flow measurement)
- Plastic (PVC or polycarbonate / Lexan)

Smaller Montana flumes tend to be fabricated from fiberglass and galvanized steel (depending upon the application), while larger Montana flumes can be fabricated from fiberglass (sizes up to 160") or concrete (160"-600").

In practice, is it usual to see Montana flumes larger than 48-inches as the need for free-spilling discharge can not usually be met, downstream scour would be excessive, or other flume types better handle the flow.

== Drawbacks ==
- Montana flumes require free-spilling discharge off the flume (for free-flow conditions). To accommodate the drop in an existing channel either the flume must be raised above the channel floor (raising the upstream water level) or the downstream channel must be modified.
- As with weirs, flumes can also have an effect on local fauna. Some species or certain life stages of the same species may be blocked by flumes due to relatively slow swim speeds or behavioral characteristics. The elevated nature of the Montana flume exacerbates this problem.
- In earthen channels, upstream bypass may occur and downstream scour will occur unless the channel is armored.and downstream scour may occur.
- Montana flumes smaller than 3 inches in size should not be used on unscreened sanitary flows, due to the likelihood of clogging.
- The Montana flume is an empirical device. Interpolation between sizes is not an accurate method of developing intermediate size Montana flumes as the flumes are not scale models of each other. The 30-inch [76.2 cm] and 42-inch [106.7 cm] sizes are examples of intermediate sizes of Montana flumes that have crept into the marketplace without the backing of published research into their sizing and flow rates.
