= Glory cloud =

Glory cloud may refer to:

- Glory (optical phenomenon), meteorological effect
  - Morning Glory cloud
- Glory of God, concept in Abrahamic religions
  - Shekhinah
  - Pillars of fire and cloud
  - Ark of the Covenant
