= Hull speed =

Speed at which the wavelength of a vessel's bow wave is equal to the waterline length

Hull speed or displacement speed (sometimes theoretical hull speed) is the speed at which the wavelength of a vessel's bow wave is equal to the waterline length of the vessel. As boat speed increases from rest, the wavelength of the bow wave increases, and usually its crest-to-trough dimension (height) increases as well. When hull speed is exceeded, a vessel in displacement mode will appear to be climbing up the back of its bow wave.

From a technical perspective, at hull speed the bow and stern waves interfere constructively, creating relatively large waves, and thus a relatively large value of wave drag. Ship drag for a displacement hull increases smoothly with speed as hull speed is approached and exceeded, often with no noticeable inflection at hull speed.

The concept of hull speed is not used in modern naval architecture, where considerations of speed/length ratio or Froude number are considered more helpful.

== Background ==
As a ship moves in the water, it creates standing waves that oppose its movement. This effect increases dramatically in full-formed hulls at a Froude number of about 0.35 (which corresponds to a speed/length ratio (see below for definition) of slightly less than 1.20 knot·ft^{−½}) because of the rapid increase of resistance from the transverse wave train. When the Froude number grows to ~0.40 (speed/length ratio ~1.35), the wave-making resistance increases further from the divergent wave train. This trend of increase in wave-making resistance continues up to a Froude number of ~0.45 (speed/length ratio ~1.50), and peaks at a Froude number of ~0.50 (speed/length ratio ~1.70).

This very sharp rise in resistance at speed/length ratio around 1.3 to 1.5 probably seemed insurmountable in early sailing ships and so became an apparent barrier. This led to the concept of hull speed.

== Empirical calculation and speed/length ratio ==
Length		Hull Speed			
metres	feet	knots	mph	km/h	m/s
3	10	4.2	4.9	7.8	2.2
5	16	5.4	6.2	10.1	2.8
7	23	6.4	7.4	11.9	3.3
10	33	7.7	8.9	14.2	3.9
15	49	9.4	10.8	17.4	4.8
20	66	10.9	12.5	20.1	5.6
30	98	13.3	15.3	24.6	6.8
40	131	15.4	17.6	28.4	7.9
50	164	17.2	19.7	31.8	8.8

Hull speed can be calculated by the following formula:

$v_{hull} \approx 1.34 \times \sqrt{L_{WL}}$

where

$L_{WL}$ is the length of the waterline in feet, and
$v_{hull}$ is the hull speed of the vessel in knots

Note that the 1.34 is not a dimensionless constant.

If the length of waterline is given in metres and desired hull speed in knots, the coefficient is 2.43 kn·m^{−½}. The constant may be given as 1.34 to 1.51 knot·ft^{−½} in imperial units (depending on the source), or 4.50 to 5.07 km·h^{−1}·m^{−½} in metric units, or 1.25 to 1.41 m·s^{−1}·m^{−½} in SI units.

The ratio of speed to $\sqrt{L_{WL}}$ is often called the "speed/length ratio", even though it is a ratio of speed to the square root of length.

== First principles calculation ==
Because the hull speed is related to the length of the boat and the wavelength of the wave it produces as it moves through water, there is another formula that arrives at the same values for hull speed based on the waterline length.

$v_{hull} = \sqrt{L_{WL}\cdot g \over 2 \pi}$

where

$L_{WL}$ is the length of the waterline in meters,
$v_{hull}$ is the hull speed of the vessel in meters per second, and
$g$ is the acceleration due to gravity in meters per second squared.

This equation is the same as the equation used to calculate the speed of surface water waves in deep water. It dramatically simplifies the units on the constant before the radical in the empirical equation, while giving a deeper understanding of the principles at play.

== Hull design implications ==
Wave-making resistance depends on the proportions and shape of the hull: many modern displacement designs can exceed their hull speed even without planing. These include hulls with very fine ends, long hulls with relatively narrow beam and wave-piercing designs. Such hull forms are commonly used by canoes, competitive rowing boats, catamarans, and fast ferries. For example, racing kayaks can exceed hull speed by more than 100% even though they do not plane.

Heavy boats with hulls designed for planing generally cannot exceed hull speed without planing.

Ultra light displacement boats are designed to plane and thereby circumvent the limitations of hull speed.

Semi-displacement hulls are usually intermediate between these two extremes.

== See also ==
- Ship resistance and propulsion – Forces in naval architecture
- Wave-making resistance – Energy of moving water away from a hull
