= Wave-making resistance =

Energy of moving water away from a hull

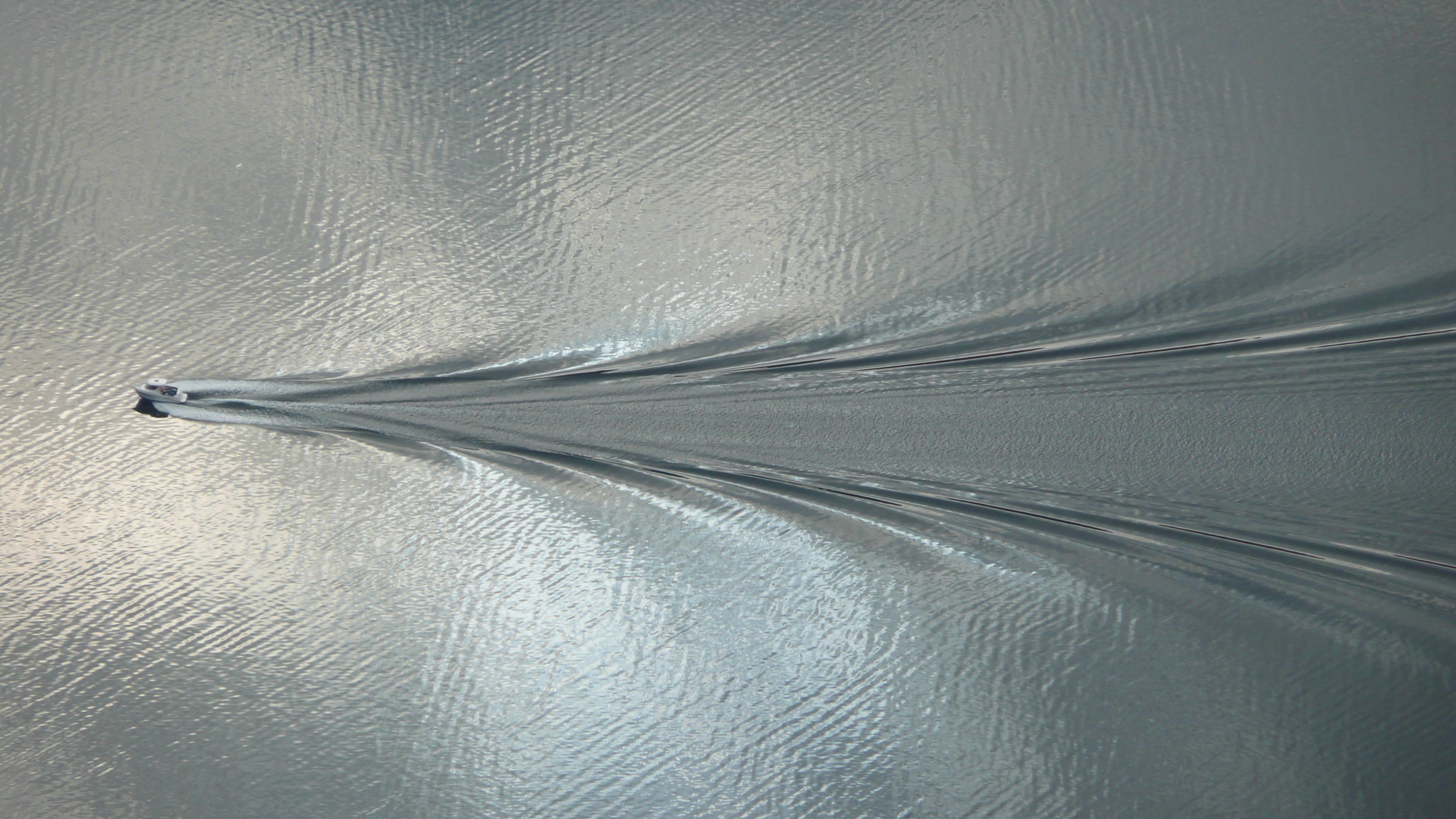
Boat creating waves in calm water.

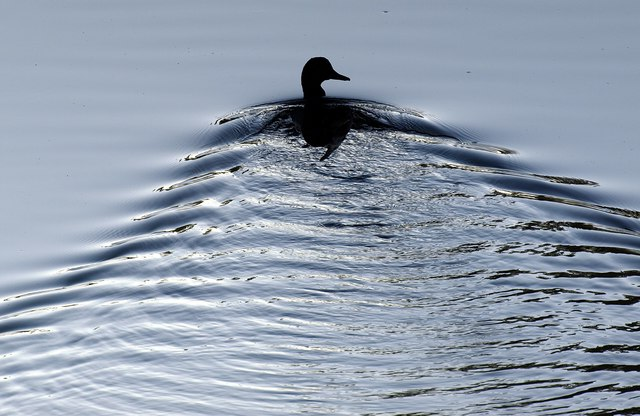
Waves in a wake of a duck.

Wave-making resistance or wave resistance is a form of drag that affects any object moving on a surface of a fluid, such as boats and ships moving on the surface of water, and reflects the energy required to push the water out of the way of that body. For example, the hull of a moving watercraft creates waves (a wake) which carry energy away and resist the motion of the watercraft. Wave resistance is only one of the components of the total resistance or drag experienced by a body moving on a surface of a fluid, others being viscous drag and pressure drag.

== Physics background ==
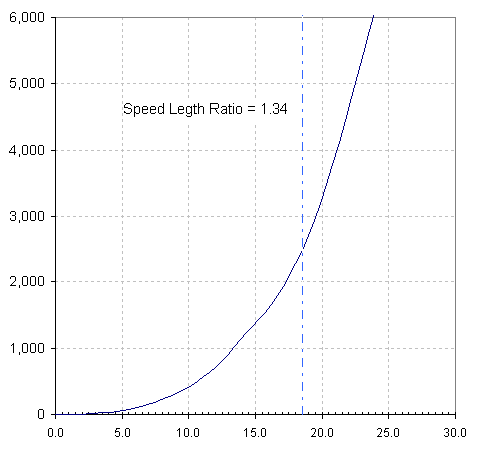
Graph of power versus speed for a displacement hull, with a mark at a speed–length ratio of 1.34

For small displacement hulls, such as sailboats or rowboats, wave-making resistance is the major source of the marine vessel drag.

A salient property of water waves is dispersiveness; i.e., the greater the wavelength, the faster it moves. Waves generated by a ship are affected by her geometry and speed, and most of the energy given by the ship for making waves is transferred to water through the bow and stern parts. Simply speaking, these two wave systems, i.e., bow and stern waves, interact with each other, and the resulting waves are responsible for the resistance. If the resulting wave is large, it carries much energy away from the ship, delivering it to the shore or wherever else the wave ends up or just dissipating it in the water, and that energy must be supplied by the ship's propulsion (or momentum), so that the ship experiences it as drag. Conversely, if the resulting wave is small, the drag experienced is small.

The amount and direction (additive or subtractive) of the interference depends upon the phase difference between the bow and stern waves (which have the same wavelength and phase speed), and that is a function of the length of the ship at the waterline. For a given ship speed, the phase difference between the bow wave and stern wave is proportional to the length of the ship at the waterline. For example, if the ship takes three seconds to travel its own length, then at some point the ship passes, a stern wave is initiated three seconds after a bow wave, which implies a specific phase difference between those two waves. Thus, the waterline length of the ship directly affects the magnitude of the wave-making resistance.

For a given waterline length, the phase difference depends upon the phase speed and wavelength of the waves, and those depend directly upon the speed of the ship. For a deepwater wave, the phase speed is the same as the propagation speed and is proportional to the square root of the wavelength. That wavelength is dependent upon the speed of the ship.

From kinematics to design implications. Having established that the interference pattern is governed by speed relative to waterline length, we can articulate the corresponding design-oriented statement and how it guides practical reduction of wave-making drag:

Thus, the magnitude of the wave-making resistance is a function of the speed of the ship in relation to its length at the waterline. In the ship wave system, a crest normally happens just after a high pressure point and trough happens just after a low pressure point in order to reduce the wave making resistance, the wave crest needs to be reduced and wave trough needs to be filled, so the general principles for reducing wave resistance involve reducing pressure just ahead of wave crest and increasing pressure just ahead of trough.

Put differently, hull forms and appendages are arranged to manipulate the near-body pressure field so that the bow- and stern-generated waves are encouraged to interfere destructively rather than constructively over the operating range of speeds.

Returning to an intuitive picture, this same dependence can be visualized as follows:

A simple way of considering wave-making resistance is to look at the hull in relation to bow and stern waves. If the length of a ship is half the length of the waves generated, the resulting wave will be very small due to cancellation, and if the length is the same as the wavelength, the wave will be large due to enhancement.

The phase speed $c$ of waves is given by the following formula:

$c = \sqrt {\frac {g}{2 \pi} l }$

where $l$ is the length of the wave and $g$ the gravitational acceleration. Substituting in the appropriate value for $g$ yields the equation:

$\mbox{c in knots} \approx 1.341 \times \sqrt{\mbox{length in ft}} \approx \frac {4}{3} \times \sqrt{\mbox{length in ft}}$

or, in metric units:

$\mbox{c in knots} \approx 2.429 \times \sqrt{\mbox{length in m}} \approx \sqrt{6 \times \mbox{length in m}} \approx 2.5 \times \sqrt{\mbox{length in m}}$

These values, 1.34, 2.5 and very easy 6, are often used in the hull speed rule of thumb used to compare potential speeds of displacement hulls, and this relationship is also fundamental to the Froude number, used in the comparison of different scales of watercraft.

When the vessel exceeds a "speed–length ratio" (speed in knots divided by square root of length in feet) of 0.94, it starts to outrun most of its bow wave, the hull actually settles slightly in the water as it is now only supported by two wave peaks. As the vessel exceeds a speed-length ratio of 1.34, the wavelength is now longer than the hull, and the stern is no longer supported by the wake, causing the stern to squat, and the bow to rise. The hull is now starting to climb its own bow wave, and resistance begins to increase at a very high rate. While it is possible to drive a displacement hull faster than a speed-length ratio of 1.34, it is prohibitively expensive to do so. Most large vessels operate at speed-length ratios well below that level, at speed-length ratios of under 1.0.

== Ways of reducing wave-making resistance ==
Since wave-making resistance is based on the energy required to push the water out of the way of the hull, there are a number of ways that this can be minimized.

=== Reduced displacement ===
Reducing the displacement of the craft, by eliminating excess weight, is the most straightforward way to reduce the wave making drag. Another way is to shape the hull so as to generate lift as it moves through the water. Semi-displacement hulls and planing hulls do this, and they are able to break through the hull speed barrier and transition into a realm where drag increases at a much lower rate. The disadvantage of this is that planing is only practical on smaller vessels, with high power-to-weight ratios, such as motorboats. It is not a practical solution for a large vessel such as a supertanker.

=== Fine entry ===
A hull with a blunt bow has to push the water away very quickly to pass through, and this high acceleration requires large amounts of energy. By using a fine bow, with a sharper angle that pushes the water out of the way more gradually, the amount of energy required to displace the water will be less. A modern variation is the wave-piercing design. The total amount of water to be displaced by a moving hull, and thus causing wave making drag, is the cross sectional area of the hull times distance the hull travels, and will not remain the same when prismatic coefficient is increased for the same length at the waterline and same displacement and same speed.

=== Bulbous bow ===
A special type of bow, called a bulbous bow, is often used on large power vessels to reduce wave-making drag. The bulb alters the waves generated by the hull, by changing the pressure distribution ahead of the bow. Because of the nature of its destructive interference with the bow wave, there is a limited range of vessel speeds over which it is effective. A bulbous bow must be properly designed to mitigate the wave-making resistance of a particular hull over a particular range of speeds. A bulb that works for one vessel's hull shape and one range of speeds could be detrimental to a different hull shape or a different speed range. Proper design and knowledge of a ship's intended operating speeds and conditions is therefore necessary when designing a bulbous bow.

=== Hull form filtering ===
If the hull is designed to operate at speeds substantially lower than hull speed then it is possible to refine the hull shape along its length to reduce wave resistance at one speed. This is practical only where the block coefficient of the hull is not a significant issue.

== Semi-displacement and planing hulls ==
A graph showing resistance–weight ratio as a function of speed–length ratio for displacement, semi-displacement, and planing hulls

Since semi-displacement and planing hulls generate a significant amount of lift in operation, they are capable of breaking the barrier of the wave propagation speed and operating in realms of much lower drag, but to do this they must be capable of first pushing past that speed, which requires significant power. This stage is called the transition stage and at this stage the rate of wave-making resistance is the highest. Once the hull gets over the hump of the bow wave, the rate of increase of the wave drag will start to reduce significantly. The planing hull will rise up clearing its stern off the water and its trim will be high. Underwater part of the planing hull will be small during the planing regime.

A qualitative interpretation of the wave resistance plot is that a displacement hull resonates with a wave that has a crest near its bow and a trough near its stern, because the water is pushed away at the bow and pulled back at the stern. A planing hull simply pushed down on the water under it, so it resonates with a wave that has a trough under it. If it has about twice the length it will therefore have only square root (2) or 1.4 times the speed. In practice most planing hulls usually move much faster than that. At four times hull speed the wavelength is already 16 times longer than the hull.

== See also ==
- Ship resistance and propulsion
- Hull (watercraft) § Shapes
- Hull speed
