= Frédéric Reech =

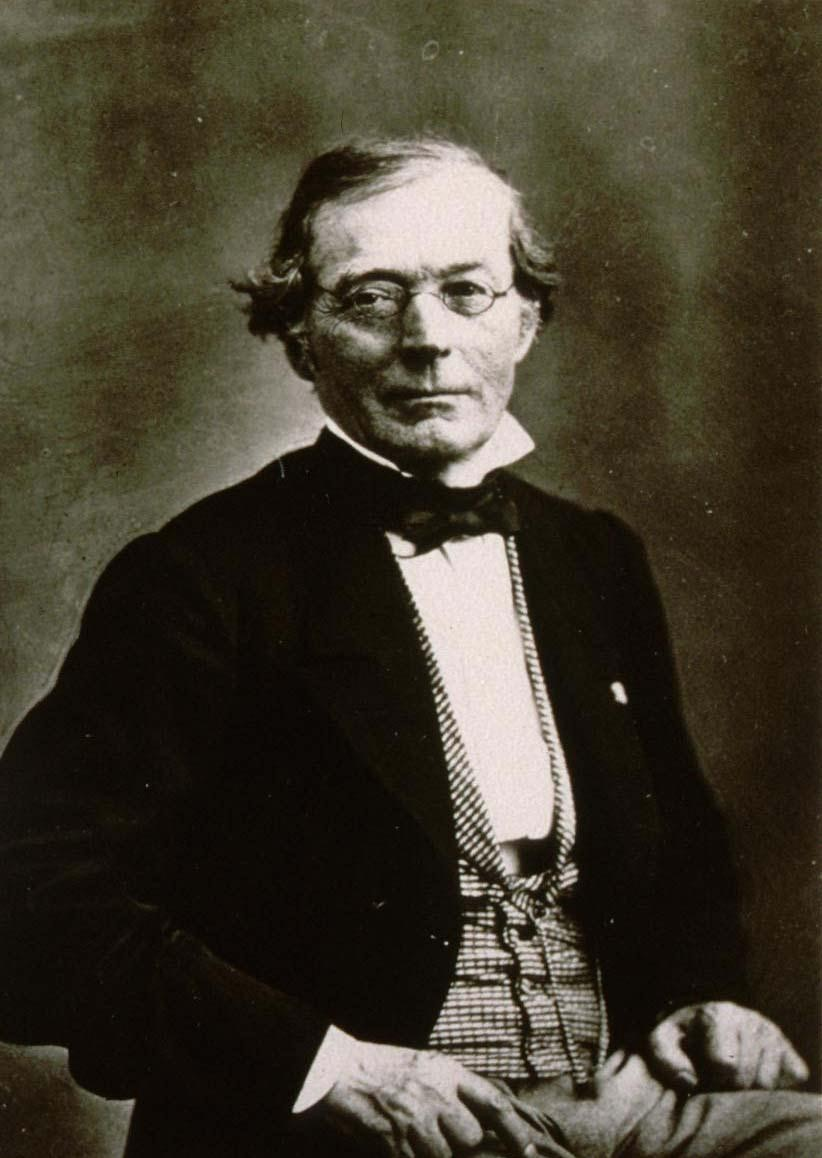

Frédéric Reech (9 September 1805 – 6 May 1884) was a French mathematician, naval engineer and professor who made contributions to thermodynamics and hydraulics. He was among the first to examine the effect of scaling of models of ships, noting the proportionality with the speed of a fluid and the inverse of the square root of its length as a law of comparison in a little-known work in 1831 which is sometimes called the Reech-Froude number. He published a number of treatises in physics including Théorie des machines motrices (1869).

Reech was born in Lambertsloch and went to the Ecole polytechnique and after graduating in 1823 he went to study maritime engineering at Brest in 1825. He worked in the navy and worked at Cherbourg and Lorient. He taught at the maritime engineering school, dealing with mechanics, thermodynamics, and hydrodynamics. After serving at the school for thirty nine years he was transferred to Paris in 1854 and also taught at Sorbonne. He was made Commander of the Legion of Honour on 12 August 1857.

In the comparison of the models of ship hulls, he noted the constant of proportionality that is now more often associated with the work of Froude but also sometimes called the Reech-Froude number. He was once described as "probably the man in the whole world most profoundly conversant with the whole mathematics and mechanics of naval architecture".

He returned in 1870 and moved to Lorient due to the German occupation of home in Alsace. He died at Lorient but was buried in Soultz-sous-Forêts near his home.
