= Ship resistance and propulsion =

Forces in naval architecture

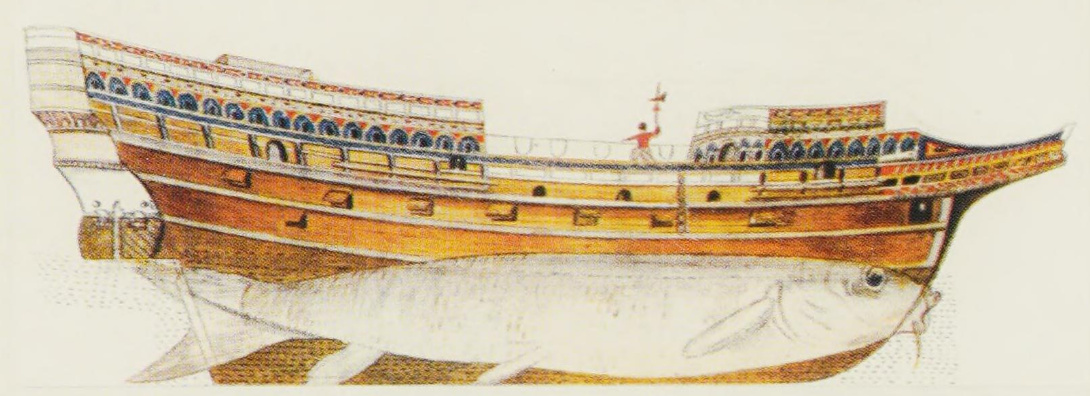
Sketch by Tudor shipwright Mathew Baker

A ship must be designed to move efficiently through the water with a minimum of external force. For thousands of years ship designers and builders of sailing vessels used rules of thumb based on the midship-section area to size the sails for a given vessel. The hull form and sail plan for the clipper ships, for example, evolved from experience, not from theory. Only with the advent of steam power and the construction of large iron ships in the mid-19th century did ship owners and builders realize that a more rigorous approach was needed.

== Definition ==
Ship resistance is defined as the force required to tow the ship in calm water at a constant velocity.

== Components of resistance ==
A stationary body in water experiences only hydrostatic pressure, which always opposes the body's weight. The total (upward) force due to this buoyancy is equal to the (downward) weight of the displaced water. If the body is in motion, hydrodynamic pressures also act on the body. For ordinary ships, which are displacement vessels, three main sources of resistance are considered: wave-making, pressure of the moving water on the form (often not calculated or measured separately), and friction of moving water on the wetted surface of the hull. These can be split up into more components:

Total resistance $R_T$
Residual resistance $R_R$	Skin friction resistance $R_{FO}$
Form effect on skin friction
Pressure resistance $R_P$	Friction resistance $R_F$
Wave resistance $R_W$	Viscous pressure resistance $R_{PV}$
Wave making resistance $R_{WM}$	Wavebreaking resistance $R_{WB}$	Viscous resistance $R_{V}$
Total resistance $R_T$

== Froude's experiments ==
Froude's method for extrapolating the results of model tests to ships was adopted in the 1870s. Another method created by Hughes introduced in the 1950s and later adopted by the International Towing Tank Conference (ITTC). Froude's method tends to overestimate the power for very large ships.

Froude had observed that when a ship or model was at her hull speed, the wave pattern of the transverse waves (the waves along the hull) have a wavelength equal to the length of the waterline. Consequently, the bow and stern both ride on one wave crest.

$V=k\sqrt{L}$

where constant (k) should be taken as: 2.43 for velocity (V) in kn and length (L) in metres (m) or, 1.34 for velocity (V) in kn and length (L) in feet (ft).

Observing this, Froude realized that the ship resistance problem had to be broken into two different parts: residuary resistance (mainly wave making resistance) and frictional resistance. To get the proper residuary resistance, it was necessary to recreate the wave train created by the ship in the model tests. He found for any ship and geometrically similar model towed at the suitable speed that:

There is a frictional drag that is given by the shear due to the viscosity. This can result in 50% of the total resistance in fast ship designs and 80% of the total resistance in slower ship designs.

To account for the frictional resistance Froude decided to tow a series of flat plates and measure the resistance of these plates, which were of the same wetted surface area and length as the model ship, and subtract this frictional resistance from the total resistance and get the remainder as the residuary resistance.

== Friction ==
In a viscous fluid, a boundary layer is formed, causing a net drag due to friction. The boundary layer undergoes shear at different rates extending from the hull surface until it reaches the field flow of the water.

== Wave-making resistance ==
A ship traversing undisturbed water sets up waves emanating mainly from her bow and stern. The waves created by the ship consist of divergent and transverse waves. The divergent waves are observed as the wake of a ship with a series of diagonal or oblique crests moving outwardly from the point of disturbance. These waves were first studied by William Thomson, 1st Baron Kelvin, who found that regardless of the speed of the ship, they were always contained within the 39° wedge shape (19.5° on each side) following the ship. The divergent waves do not cause much resistance against the ship's forward motion. However, the transverse waves appear as troughs and crests along the length of a ship and constitute the major part of the wave-making resistance of a ship. The energy associated with the transverse wave system travels at one half the phase velocity or the group velocity of the waves. The prime mover of the vessel must put additional energy into the system in order to overcome this expense of energy. The relationship between the velocity of ships and that of the transverse waves can be found by equating the wave celerity and the ship's velocity.

== Propulsion ==
Ships can be propelled by numerous sources of power: human, animal, or wind power (sails, kites, rotors and turbines), water currents, chemical or atomic fuels and stored electricity, pressure, heat or solar power supplying engines and motors. Most of these can propel a ship directly (e.g. by towing or chain), via hydrodynamic drag devices (e.g. oars and paddle wheels) and via hydrodynamic lift devices (e.g. propellers or jets). A few exotic means also exist, such as "fish-tail propulsion", rockets or magnetohydrodynamic propulsion.

== See also ==
- William Froude
