= Altostratus undulatus cloud =

Variety of cloud

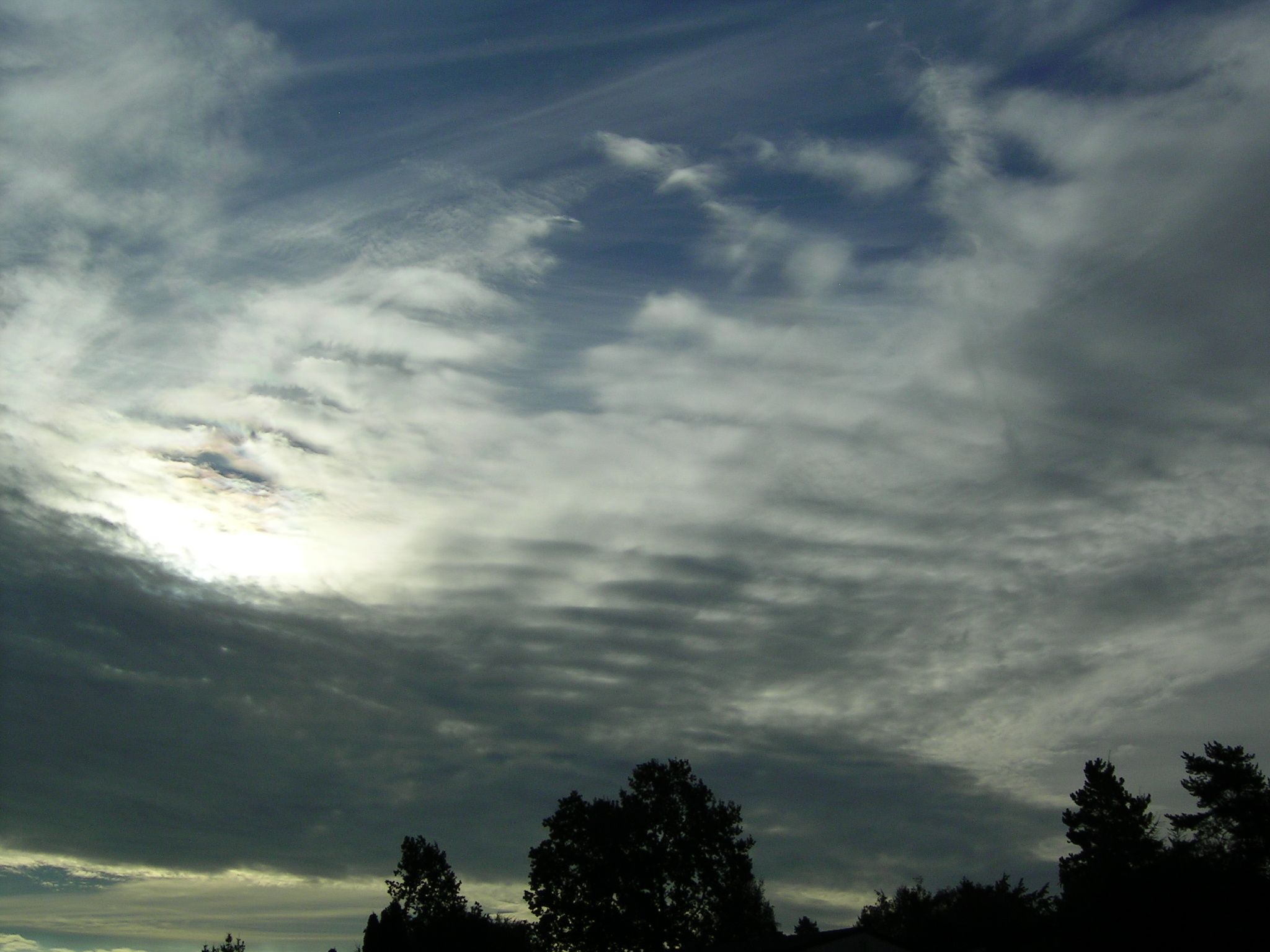
- Cirrus and Altostratus undulatus clouds
- Abbreviation: As
- Genus: Alto- (high), -stratus (layered)
- Species: undulatus (waves)
- Altitude: 2400-6100 m (8,000-20,000 ft)
- Classification: Family B (Medium-level)
- Appearance: Wavy, like ripples in a pond
- Precipitation: Uncommon Rain,snow,or drizzle

The altostratus undulatus is a type of altostratus cloud with signature undulations within it. These undulations may be visible (usually as "wavy bases"), but frequently they are indiscernible to the naked eye. These formations will generally appear in the early stages of destabilizing return flows, especially over the southern plains of the United States, when the surface temperature is still relatively cool. The wavy strips of clouds are generally near an inversion surface.

Also referred to as billow clouds, wind row clouds, or wave clouds, variations of the undulatus can be elements that have merged or single elements that have stretched through the sky.

== See also ==
- Cloud types
- Earth's atmosphere
- Undular bore
