= Morning Glory cloud =

Meteorological phenomenon

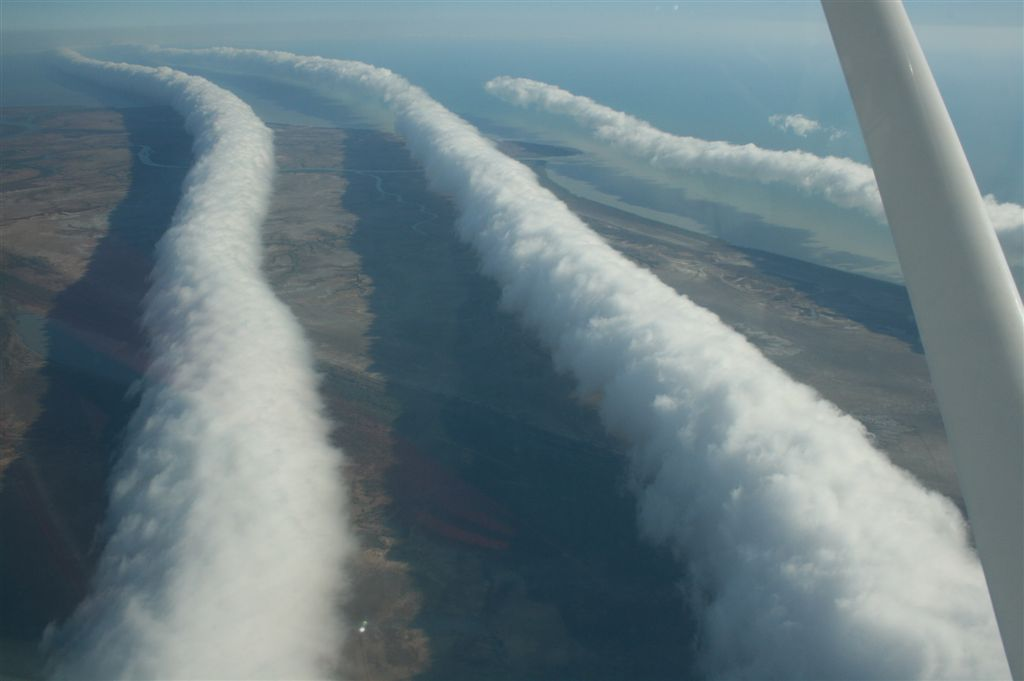
A Morning Glory cloud formation between Burketown and Normanton, Australia.

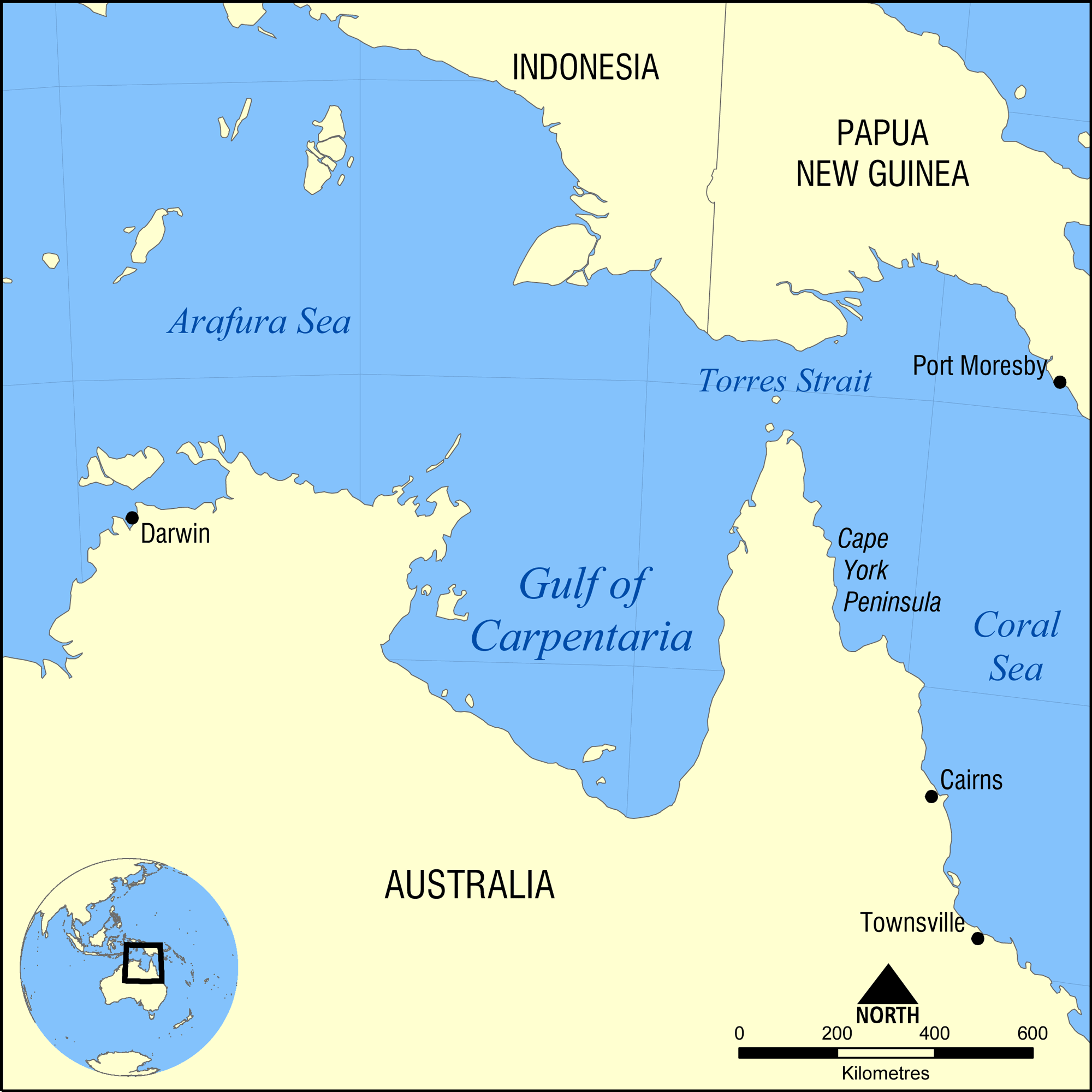
The location of the Gulf of Carpentaria.

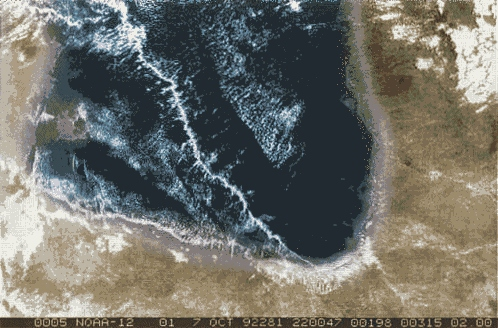
Satellite photo of morning cloud formations over the Gulf of Carpentaria. Northern part of the visible linear cloud is North Australian Squall Line, Morning Glory cloud is the very southern part of this linear cloud.

The Morning Glory cloud is a rare meteorological phenomenon consisting of a low-level atmospheric solitary wave and associated cloud, occasionally observed in different locations around the world. The wave often occurs as an amplitude-ordered series of waves forming bands of roll clouds.

The southern part of the Gulf of Carpentaria in Northern Australia is the only known location where it can be predicted and observed regularly due to the configuration of land and sea in the area.

== Description ==
Morning Glory clouds can be observed from Burketown from late September to early November. The town attracts glider pilots intent on riding this phenomenon. There are generally only a handful of well formed spectacular clouds during this period at Burketown. During the 2012 season there were only four to be seen from there, but quite a few ragged unspectacular cloud lines were seen. Often they start to break up before arriving at Burketown or pass to the north and only stay well formed over water. In an aircraft there is a significantly better chance of sighting the cloud.

A Morning Glory cloud is a roll cloud, or arcus cloud, that can be up to 1,000 kilometres (620 mi) long,1 to 2 kilometres (0.62 to 1.24 mi) high, often only 100 to 200 metres (330 to 660 ft) above the ground. The cloud often travels at the rate of 10 to 20 metres per second. Sometimes there is only one cloud, sometimes there are up to ten consecutive roll clouds. Three distinct types of Morning Glory clouds have been identified.

The Morning Glory is often accompanied by sudden wind squalls, intense low-level wind shear, a rapid increase in the vertical displacement of air parcels, and a sharp pressure jump at the surface. Cloud is continuously formed at the leading edge while being eroded at the trailing edge. Showers or thunderstorms may develop in its wake. In the front of the cloud, there is strong vertical motion that transports air up through the cloud and creates the rolling appearance, while the air in the middle and rear of the cloud becomes turbulent and sinks. The cloud quickly dissipates over land where the air is drier.

The cloud can also be described as a solitary wave or a soliton or an undular bore, which is a wave that has a single crest and moves without changing speed or shape. They have been called "the biggest waves on the planet". The wave may occur without the appearance of any clouds.

== History of exploration ==
Unusual cloud formations have been noticed here since ancient times. The local Garrwa Aboriginal people called it kangólgi. Royal Australian Air Force pilots first reported this phenomenon in 1942.

The Morning Glory cloud of the Gulf of Carpentaria has been studied by multiple teams of scientists since the early 1970s. The first studies were published by Reg H. Clarke (University of Melbourne). Multiple studies have followed since then, proposing diverse mathematical models explaining the complex movements of air masses in the region.

== Atmospheric conditions ==
One of the main contributors for the formation of the morning glory clouds is the mesoscale circulations associated with a difference in sea breezes that develop over the Peninsula and the Gulf. On the large scale, Morning Glories are usually associated with frontal systems crossing central Australia and high pressure in northern Australia. Locals have noted that the Morning Glory is likely to occur when the humidity in the area is high, which provides moisture for the cloud to form, and when strong sea breezes have blown the preceding day.

The following is a summary of the conditions that cause the Morning Glory cloud to form in the Gulf of Carpentaria (after hypothesis of R.H.Clarke, as described in 1981). First, Cape York, which is the peninsula that lies to the east of the gulf, is large enough that sea breezes develop on both sides. During the day, the breeze from the Coral Sea coast blows in from the east and the breeze from the gulf blows in from the west. The two breezes meet in the middle of the peninsula, forcing the air to rise there and form a line of clouds over the spine of the peninsula. When night comes, the air cools and descends and at the same time a surface inversion (where air temperature increases with height) forms over the gulf. The densities in this stable layer are different above and below the inversion. The air descending from the peninsula to the east goes underneath the inversion layer and this generates a series of waves or rolling cylinders which travel across the gulf. These cylinders of air roll along the underside of the inversion layer, so that the air rises at the front of the wave and sinks at the rear. In the early morning, the air is saturated enough so that the rising air in the front produces a cloud, which forms the leading edge of the cylinder, and evaporates in the back, hence forming the Morning Glory cloud. The cloud lasts until the surface inversion disappears with the heating of the day.

There are other ways in which Morning Glory clouds form, especially in rarer cases in other parts of the world, but these are far less understood.

Local weather lore in the area suggests that when the fridges frost over and the café tables' corners curl upwards at the Burketown Pub, there is enough moisture in the air for the clouds to form. Reportedly, all winds cease at ground level as the cloud passes over.

== Other reported occurrences ==
Although the Morning Glory clouds over the southern part of the Gulf of Carpentaria are the most frequent and predictable, similar phenomena have occasionally been observed elsewhere, e.g., over central United States, Canada, in the English Channel, Munich, Berlin, eastern Russia, and other maritime regions of Australia.

Morning Glory clouds have occasionally been reported on Cape Cod and in the Gulf of California off the Mexican coast. The phenomenon has also been observed from Sable Island, 180 km southeast of Nova Scotia. A Morning Glory also passed through Yarmouth, Nova Scotia, in April 2009, as well as several communities in Newfoundland in May 2022. In contrast to the Gulf of Carpentaria where the Morning Glory is visible in the morning, those in the Maritimes have all occurred during the evening. Rare examples have been observed via satellite observation over the Joseph Bonaparte Gulf in the Eastern Kimberley region of Australia as well as over the Arabian Sea. A Morning Glory cloud was observed in 2007 over the Campos dos Goytacazes bay in the state of Rio de Janeiro, Brazil. In August 2011, it happened again over Peregrino Field in South Campos Basin in Brazil. The phenomenon was also recorded on Batroun's shore (Lebanon – Middle East) in September 2004. On 20 November 2013, a Morning Glory formation formed over the greater Durban area. On 4 June 2015 a Morning Glory cloud formed over St. Cloud, FL, US. On 3 November 2016 a Morning Glory cloud formed over Appelscha, The Netherlands. On 5 February 2018 a Morning Glory cloud formed over Richmond, Virginia, US. On 30 August 2018, a Morning Glory cloud formed over Ruskin, FL, US.

== See also ==
- Gravity wave
- Hector (cloud)
