= Supercritical flow =

Flow velocity larger than wave velocity

A supercritical flow is a flow whose velocity is larger than the wave velocity. The analogous condition in gas dynamics is supersonic speed.

According to the website Civil Engineering Terms, supercritical flow is defined as follows: The flow at which depth of the channel is less than critical depth, velocity of flow is greater than critical velocity and slope of the channel is also greater than the critical slope is known as supercritical flow.

Information travels at the wave velocity. This is the velocity at which waves travel outwards from a pebble thrown into a lake. The flow velocity is the velocity at which a leaf in the flow travels. If a pebble is thrown into a supercritical flow then the ripples will all move down stream whereas in a subcritical flow some would travel up stream and some would travel down stream. It is only in supercritical flows that hydraulic jumps (bores) can occur. In fluid dynamics, the change from one behaviour to the other is often described by a dimensionless quantity, where the transition occurs whenever this number becomes less or more than one. One of these numbers is the Froude number:

- $Fr \ \stackrel{\mathrm{def}}{=}\ \frac{U}{\sqrt{gh}},$

where

- U = velocity of the flow
- g = acceleration due to gravity (9.81 m/s² or 32.2 ft/s²)
- h = depth of flow relative to the channel bottom

If $Fr < 1$, we call the flow subcritical; if $Fr > 1$, we call the flow supercritical. If $Fr \approx 1$, it is critical.

== See also ==
- Supercritical fluid
- Supercritical vs. subcritical flow
- Supersonic
- Hypersonic
- Sonic black hole
