= Hydraulic jump =

Abrupt increase in depth and decrease in speed of a stream

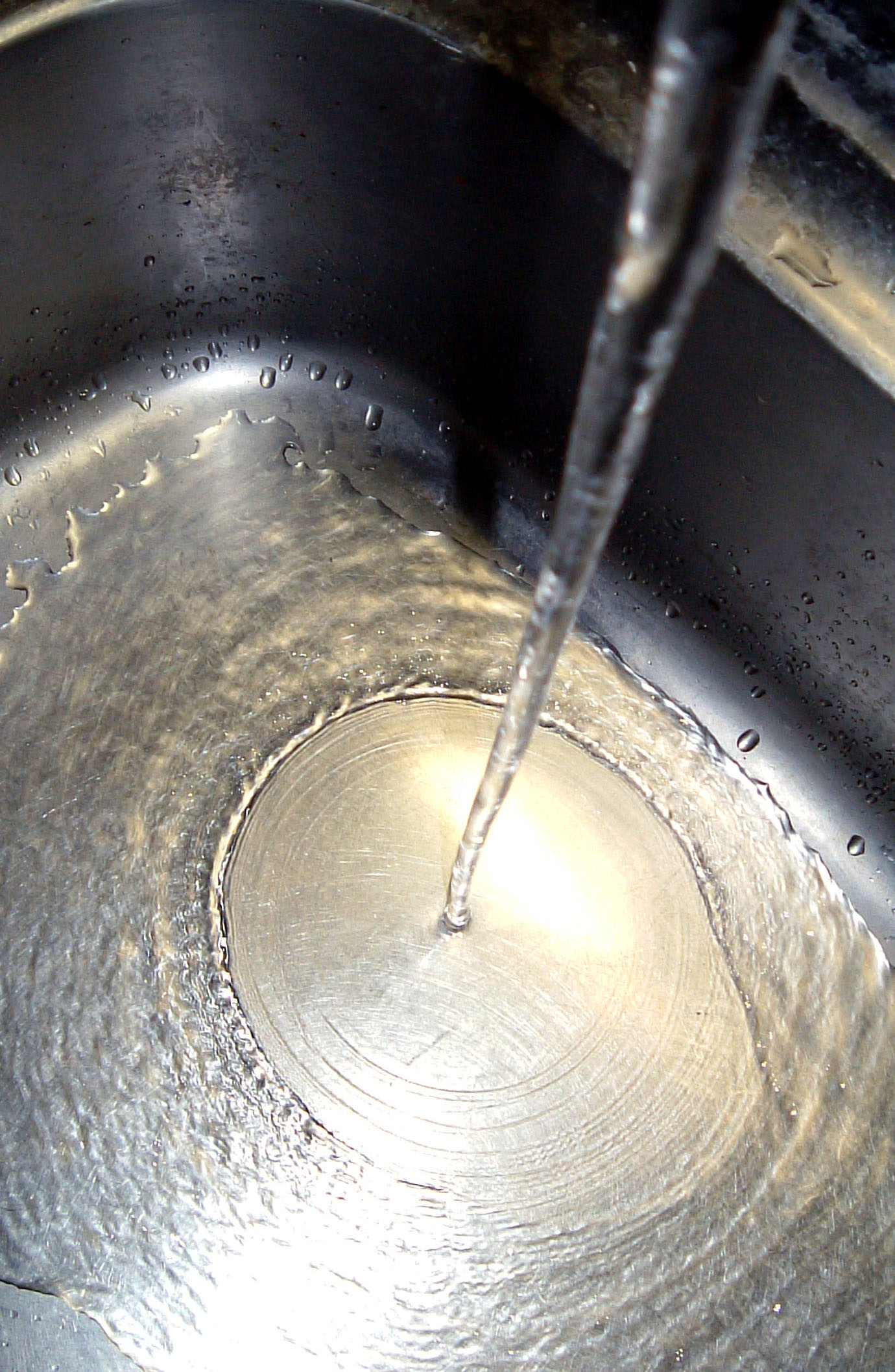
The roughly circular hydraulic jump is around the central stream of water from a tap when it hits the flat surface of a sink. The thin region in the center has high speed and the thick region beyond has low speed.

A hydraulic jump is an abrupt increase in the depth of a fast-moving liquid stream in an open channel, which is accompanied by a decrease in speed. The jump appears as a wavy or turbulent region between the high-speed upstream flow and the slower downstream flow. A common example is the circular jump formed when a tap runs into a kitchen sink.

Hydraulic jumps occur below dam spillways and in rivers. Hydraulic jumps may be stationary, as below a dam, or they may propagate as surges along a stream, as in a tidal bore. Civil engineers design spillways and stilling basins to create hydraulic jumps that dissipate the mechanical energy of water flowing over dams.

A hydraulic jump can form only when the upstream flow moves faster than shallow-water waves, so that small disturbances to the flow cannot travel upstream. For speeds only slightly above the wave speed, the transition is a rolling wave. As the flow speed increases, the transition becomes more abrupt, until at high enough speeds the front breaks and curls upstream. These regimes are characterized by the ratio of upstream speed to wave speed, which is called the Froude number.

Hydraulic jumps also occur in stratified flows, including in the atmosphere and the oceans. In rivers, they can create both recreational whitewater features and dangerous recirculating currents.

== History ==
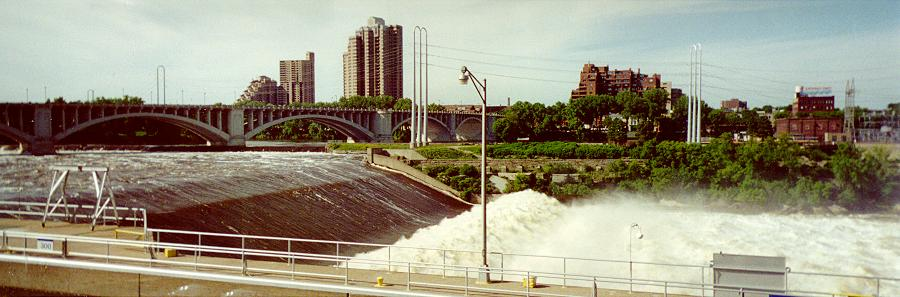
Concrete overflow spillway at Lower St. Anthony Falls on the Mississippi River, showing a pronounced hydraulic jump at its base.

As early as 1504, Leonardo da Vinci described and sketched water flows now understood as hydraulic jumps in his Codex Leicester. The first experimental investigations of hydraulic jumps were published by Giorgio Bidone in 1820. Jean-Baptiste Bélanger formulated the first modern theory of the hydraulic jump in 1841.

Experimental and theoretical studies of hydraulic jumps continued during the second half of the 19th century, but Hager described Safranez’s 1927 work as the first systematic experimental investigation of the phenomenon. Research in the 1930s established the importance of the Froude number for characterizing the flow in hydraulic jumps.

Hydraulic works had used devices such as stepped cascades to reduce the energy of flowing water since antiquity. In the early 20th century, hydraulic jumps, energy dissipators, and stilling basins became subjects of intensive study, and by the mid-20th century standard stilling-basin design guidance had been codified.

== Stationary and moving hydraulic jumps ==
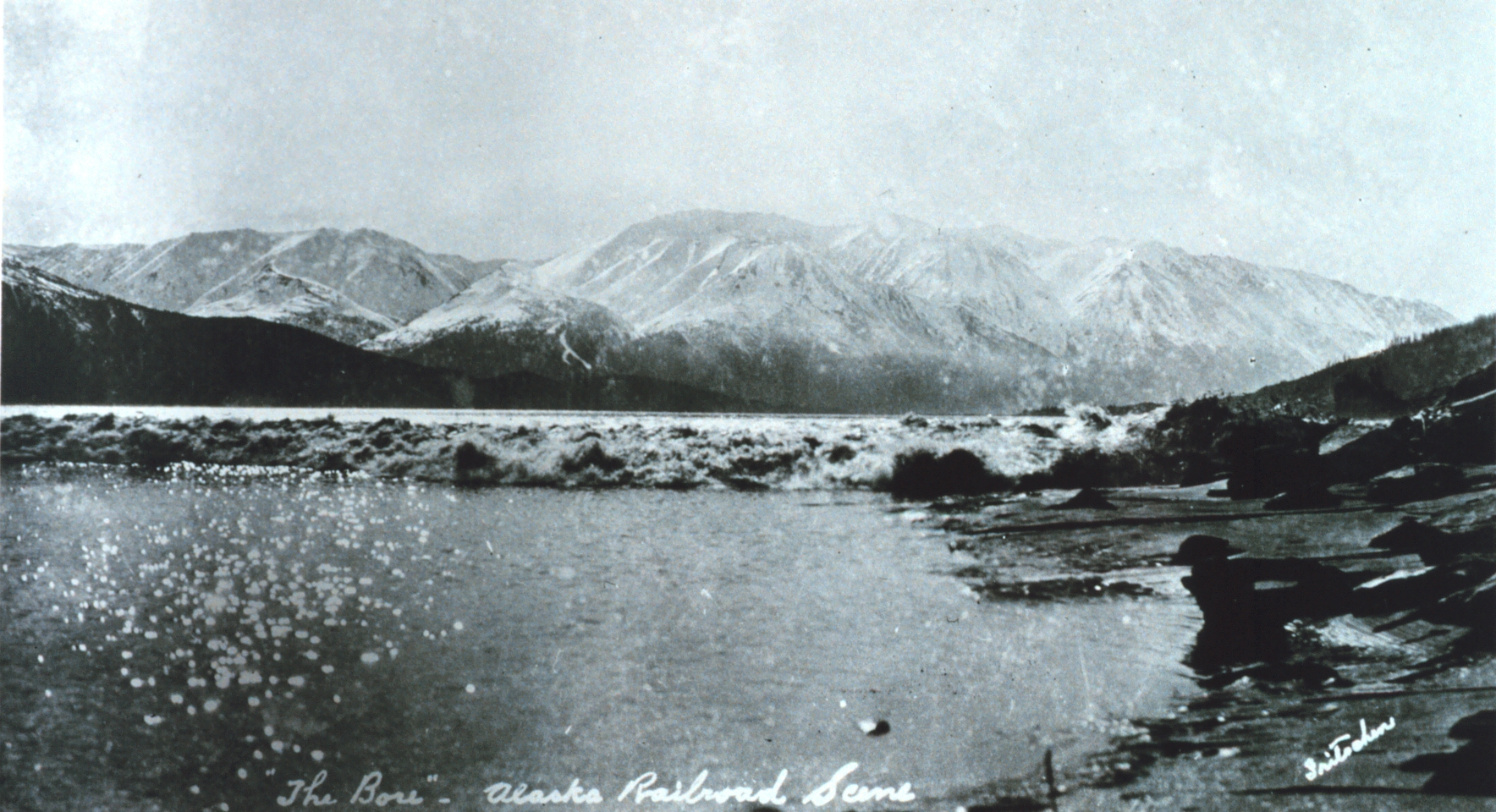
A tidal bore in Alaska showing a steep, turbulent front. The upstream water is relatively shallow and the fractional change in elevation is large.

Hydraulic jumps may also be classified according to whether the transition is stationary or propagates as a surge.

A stationary hydraulic jump occurs at a fixed location. Upstream of the jump, the flow is fast and shallow; downstream, it is slow and deep. In the transition zone, the water slows and deepens in an abrupt step or standing wave. Downstream of the jump, the flow is typically turbulent and choppy.

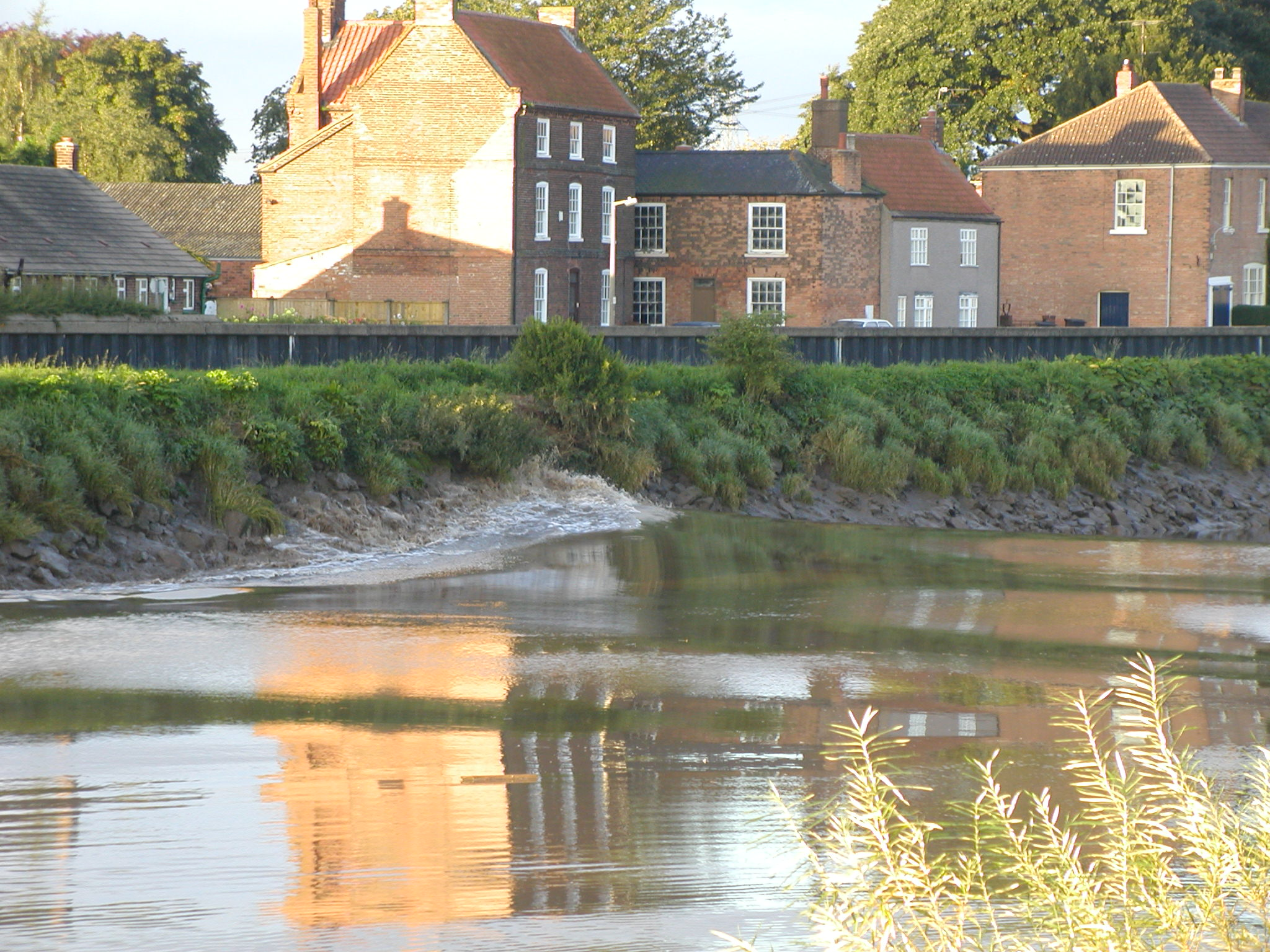
An undular front on a tidal bore. The upstream water is relatively deep and the fractional change in elevation is small.

A moving hydraulic jump, or surge, is a steep or undulating wavefront that propagates along the stream. A positive surge is a sudden increase in water depth that propagates as a wave either upstream or downstream. For example, when a dam breaks, a steep wall of water rushes downstream, and in tidal bores, a surge propagates upstream as the tide comes in.

Tidal bores occur in rivers or narrow bays when the incoming tide travels upstream against the current. A tidal bore advancing into shallow upstream water typically shows a large and steep elevation difference, whereas a tidal bore entering deep upstream water may have a small elevation difference and an undulating wavefront. In both cases, the bore moves at the speed characteristic of waves in water of the depth immediately behind the wavefront.

In a frame of reference moving with a surge, the surge is equivalent to a stationary jump.

== The Bélanger equation and the Froude number ==
The principles of conservation of mass and conservation of momentum lead to an equation relating the depths downstream and upstream of the jump. The equation, known as the Bélanger equation, agrees closely with both field and laboratory measurements.

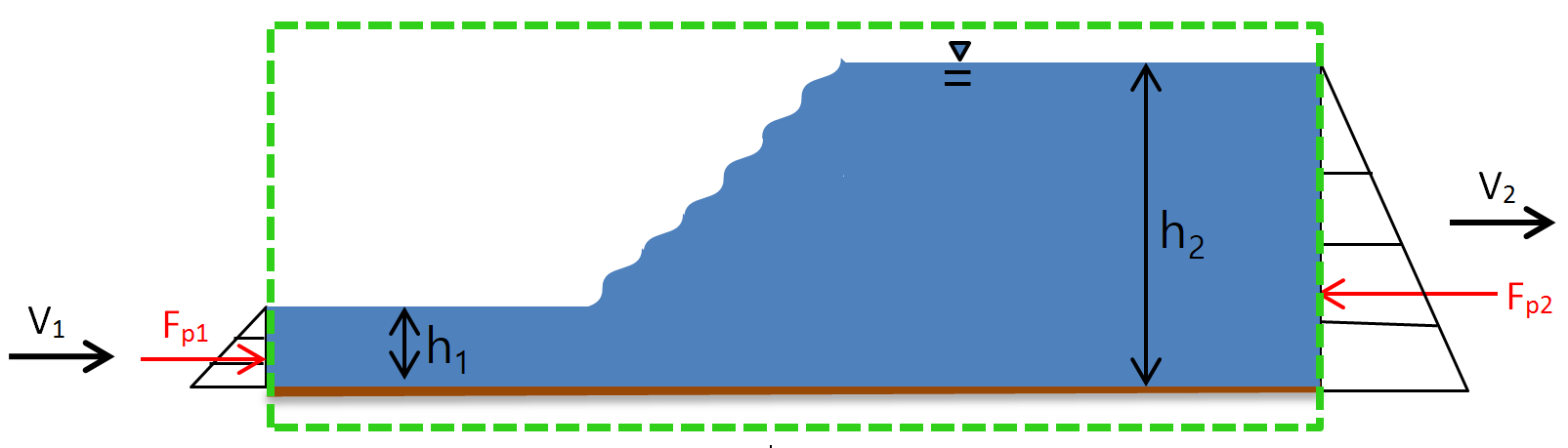
A hydraulic jump surrounded by an imaginary control surface (dotted green line) showing upstream and downstream hydrostatic forces

The Bélanger equation describes a hydraulic jump in a rectangular channel of uniform width, under idealized assumptions. The flow upstream of the jump has depth $h_1$ and an average speed $v_1$. Downstream of the jump, the depth and average speed are $h_2$ and $v_2$ (see figure). Drag forces from the surface below the jump are presumed to be negligible. The liquid has a density $\rho$, and $g$ is the gravitational acceleration.

If the flow is steady, the mass flow rate into the jump equals the mass flow rate out of the jump. Per unit width, this gives:

$$\rho v_1 h_1 = \rho v_2 h_2$$

The momentum inflow and hydrostatic pressure force upstream must equal the momentum outflow and hydrostatic pressure force downstream, so that:

$$\rho v_1^2h_1 + {1 \over 2} \rho gh_1^2 = \rho v_2^2h_2 + {1 \over 2} \rho gh_2^2$$

Combining these expressions gives the ratio $h_2/h_1$:

$${h_2 \over h_1} =\frac{ \sqrt{1+{\frac{8v_1^2}{gh_1}}}-1}{2}$$

This result is called the Bélanger equation.

The change in depth for non-rectangular cross-sections has also been studied.

=== The Froude number ===
The ratio $v_1 / \sqrt{gh_1}$ that appears in the Bélanger equation is called the Froude number of the upstream flow:

$$\text{Fr}_1 = {v_1 \over \sqrt{gh_1}}$$

The Froude number is dimensionless. In terms of the Froude number, the Bélanger equation is:

$${h_2 \over h_1} =\frac{{\sqrt{1+{{8\text{Fr}_1^2}}}-1}}{2}$$

If $\text{Fr}_1 > 1$, the equation shows that $h_2 > h_1$, corresponding to an increase in depth across the jump. For $\text{Fr}_1 < 1$, the equation gives $h_2 < h_1$, implying a decrease in depth, but this solution is not physically admissible because it would require an increase in mechanical energy across the jump, violating the second law of thermodynamics. For $\text{Fr}_1 = 1$, the depth does not change.

Thus, the hydraulic jump can occur only when $\text{Fr}_1 > 1$.

The speed of a shallow-water gravity wave is $\sqrt{gh_1}$, so the condition $\text{Fr}_1 > 1$ is equivalent to an upstream speed greater than the wave speed. This situation is called supercritical flow. The flow downstream of the jump moves slower than water waves ($\text{Fr}_2 < 1$) and is thus subcritical flow. A hydraulic jump is always a transition from supercritical to subcritical flow.

=== Analogy to shock waves in compressible flow ===
In compressible-fluid dynamics, flow with speed greater than the speed of sound is termed supersonic, while flow with speed less than the speed of sound is subsonic. The ratio of flow speed to sound speed is the Mach number, Ma. Across a shock wave, a supersonic flow (Ma > 1) abruptly changes to subsonic flow (Ma < 1). A hydraulic jump is analogous to a shock wave in that it marks a transition from supercritical flow (Fr > 1) to subcritical flow (Fr < 1), with the Froude number playing a role analogous to the Mach number.

== Hydraulic jumps in civil engineering ==
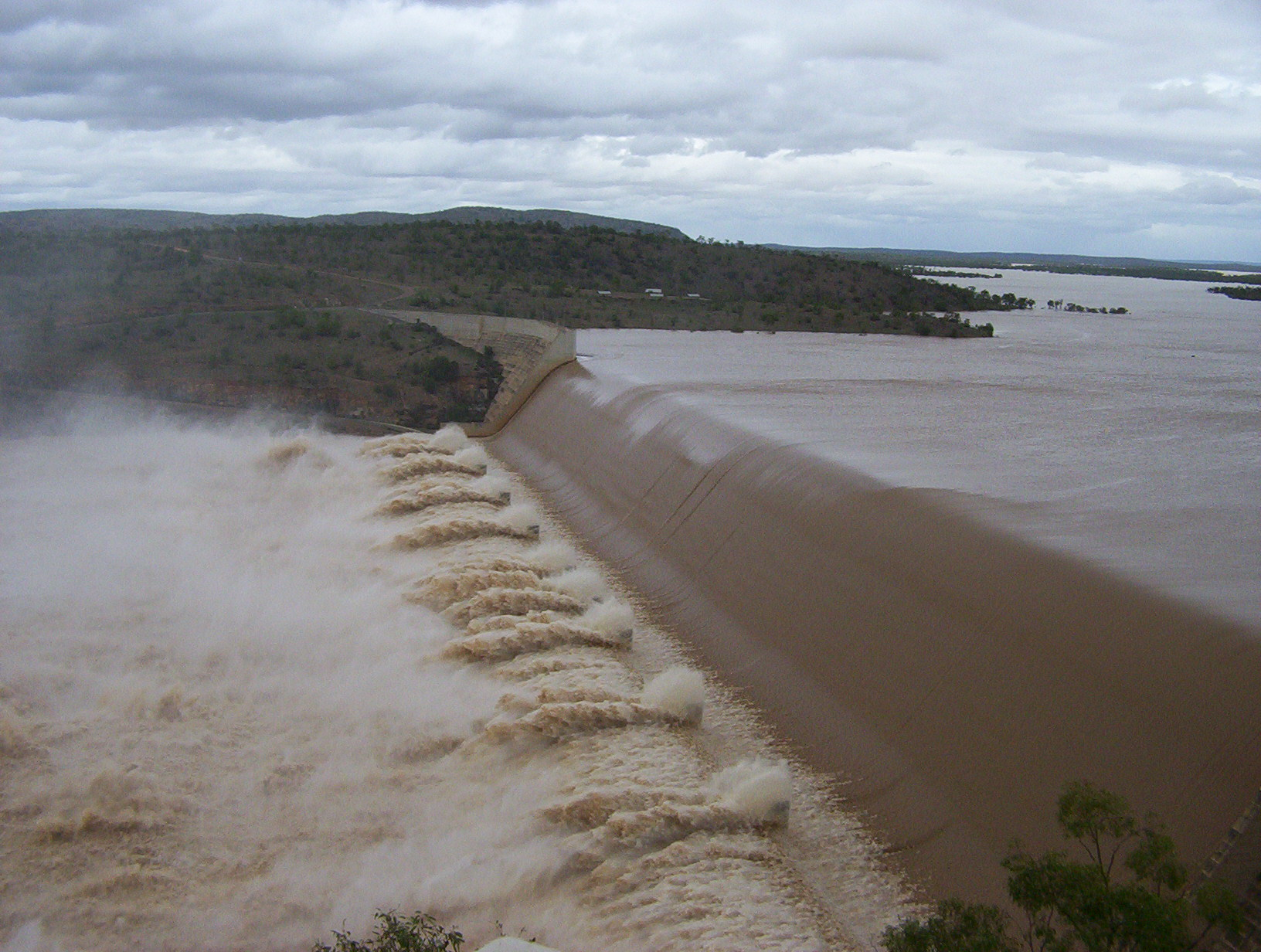
Burdekin Dam on the Burdekin River in Queensland, Australia showing a hydraulic jump induced by both downstream obstructions and a change of slope

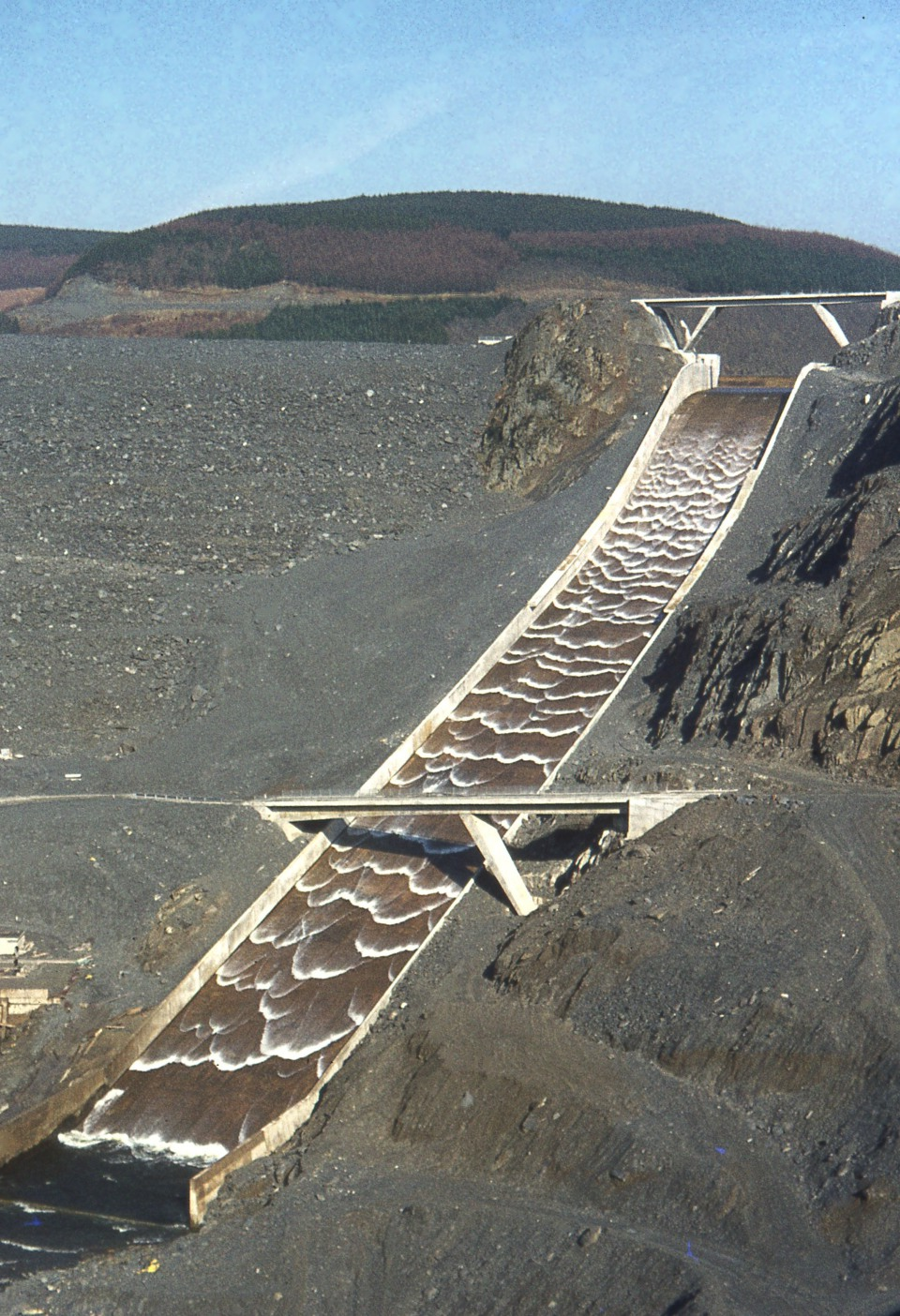
Series of roll waves moving down a spillway, where they terminate in a stationary hydraulic jump

The high kinetic energy of water flowing down a dam spillway can cause erosion of the streambed downstream, potentially undermining the structure. A hydraulic jump can dissipate much of this energy. To limit damage, this hydraulic jump should normally occur on an apron engineered to withstand hydraulic forces and to resist local cavitation and other erosion-causing phenomena.

In the design of a spillway and apron, engineers control the location of the hydraulic jump. Structural features such as slope changes or obstructions are often incorporated into the apron to induce a jump at a specific location. Alternatively, a horizontal apron may be designed so that the supercritical flow from the spillway transitions to subcritical flow as it encounters deeper downstream water. In practice, the position of the hydraulic jump is governed by both the apron geometry and the downstream water depth (tailwater), which together determine whether the flow can remain supercritical.

Engineers often use hydraulic jumps for energy dissipation below spillways and outlets. A properly designed hydraulic jump can dissipate on the order of 60–70% of the flow’s mechanical energy within the stilling basin, limiting the damage to structures and the streambed. Even with such efficient energy dissipation, stilling basins must be carefully designed to avoid serious damage due to uplift, vibration, cavitation, and abrasion.

Conservation of energy can be applied across the jump to calculate the dissipation of mechanical energy (the sum of kinetic and potential energy per unit mass of water). Expressed as loss of hydraulic head (in meters), the dissipation is:

$$\text{head loss} = \frac{(h_2 - h_1)^3}{4 h_1 h_2}$$

This equation also agrees closely with measurements. The head loss increases with the difference in downstream and upstream depth and therefore rises with the Froude number.

The following table summarizes the trend between depth change, energy dissipation, and jump characteristics with increasing Froude number. The ranges given for the jump characteristics are approximate and can overlap. The length of the hydraulic jump ranges from approximately 4 times the downstream depth for weak jumps to approximately 6.2 times the downstream depth for steady and strong jumps.

Depth change, features, and energy dissipation for rising Froude number
Froude number upstream of jump	Ratio of depth after to depth before jump	Descriptive characteristics of jump	Fraction of mechanical energy dissipated by jump
≤ 1.0	1.0	No hydraulic jump forms	none
1.0–1.7	1.0–2.0	Water surface shows undulations (“undular jump”)	< 5%
1.7–2.5	2.0–3.1	Small rollers develop on the surface, but downstream water is smooth (a “weak jump”)	5% – 15%
2.5–4.5	3.1–5.9	Oscillating jet moves up and down in jump and large waves can travel far downstream (“oscillating jump”)	15% – 45%
4.5–9.0	5.9–12.0	Stable jump; position is less sensitive to downstream depth and energy dissipation is high (“steady jump”)	45% – 70%
> 9.0	> 12.0	Rough surface and downstream waves, high dissipation (“strong jump”)	70% – 85%

== Internal hydraulic jumps ==
Most hydraulic jumps discussed in open-channel flow occur at a free surface. In stratified fluids, analogous jumps can occur at an internal density interface rather than at the air–water boundary. These internal hydraulic jumps are rapid transitions between internally supercritical and internally subcritical flow, meaning that the flow changes from faster than internal waves along the interface to slower than them. Internal jumps are often associated with strong mixing of the fluid layers.

Internal hydraulic jumps occur in a variety of geophysical settings, including two-layer flows over underwater sills and stratified atmospheric flow over mountains. In the atmosphere, they may form on the lee side of topography and are often discussed alongside mountain lee waves. A well-documented example occurs in the lee of the Sierra Nevada in California, where cloud formations can make the jump visible.

== Recreation and hazards ==
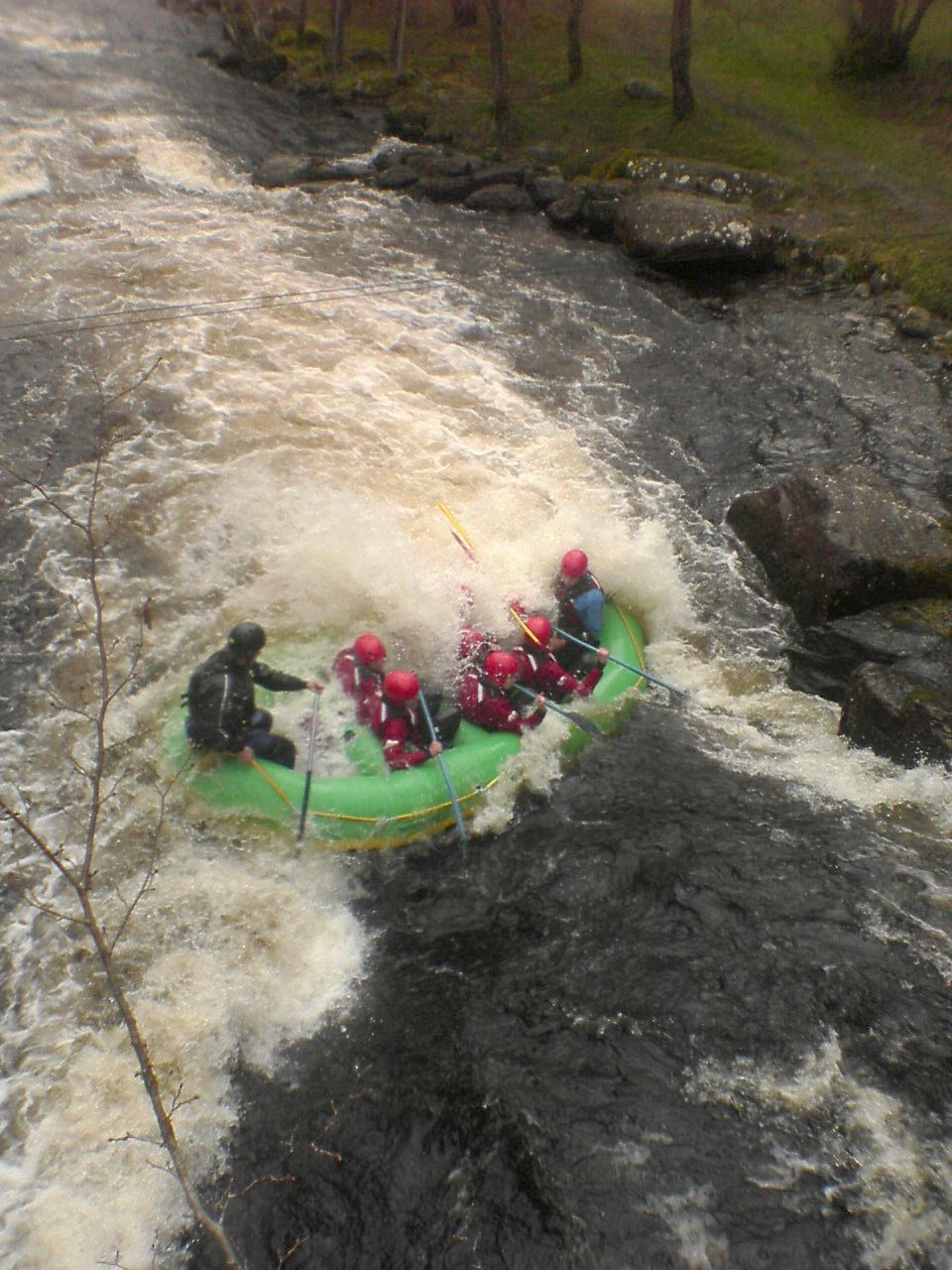
A raft encountering a hydraulic jump on Canolfan Tryweryn in Wales

Hydraulic jumps and the standing waves associated with them are used in whitewater recreation, including kayaking, canoeing, rafting, and river surfing. In artificial whitewater parks, in-stream structures are often designed to create hydraulic jumps for kayakers and other boaters. Kayakers and surfers sometimes ride tidal bores up rivers.

Hydraulic jumps can also pose serious hazards to recreational river users. Below sharp drops, and especially below low-head dams, a submerged hydraulic roller may form in which recirculating flow can trap boats, swimmers, and debris for extended periods. In whitewater paddling, highly retentive holes are often called “keepers”. Low-head dams are sometimes described in safety literature as “drowning machines”.

== Surface tension and pattern formation in thin-film jumps ==
A liquid jet striking a surface, as in a kitchen sink, creates a thin liquid film that spreads radially before undergoing a hydraulic jump. For laminar jets, the thin film and the hydraulic jump can be entirely smooth and steady. In 1993, Liu and Lienhard showed that surface tension sets the shape of these jumps. Many subsequent studies have explored the role of surface tension in such jumps. When capillary instability appears, a jump can adopt complex non-circular patterns, including polygons, three- and four-leaf clovers, bow ties, and cat’s eyes.

== See also ==
- Diablo wind
- Drop structure
- Undular bore
- Weir
