= Carmine (given name) =

- Pronunciation: Italian: [ˈkar.mi.ne] or Italian: [kar'mi.ne]
- Gender: male

Origin
- Origin: Hebrew and Latin, respectively
- Meaning: "garden" and "of song"
- Region of origin: Italy, English-speaking countries

Other names
- Related names: Carmelita, Carmelito, Carmelina, Carmelino, Carmella, Carmela, Carmelo, Carmel, Carmen, Carmina, Carmo, Carme
- The "garden" origin from Hebrew karmel, the "of song" origin from Late Latin carmīnis; the two origins are unrelated

Carmine is a male given name of Italian origins. It also has the meaning "purplish-red" from an Aramaic word qirmizī which means "crimson" in English. Notable people with the name include:

- Carmine Abate (born 1954), Italian writer
- Carmine Abbagnale (born 1962), Italian competition rower
- Carmine Agnello (born 1960), American alleged mobster
- Carmine Alfieri (born 1943), Italian fugitive
- Carmine Appice (born 1946), American drummer
- Carmine Benincasa (1947–2020), Italian art critic
- Carmine Caracciolo, 5th Prince of Santo Buono (1671–1726), grandee of Spain
- Carmine Cardamone (born 1950), American politician
- Carmine Caridi (1934–2019), American film actor
- Carmine Chiappetta (born 2003), Swiss football player
- Carmine Cirella (born 1960), Canadian ice hockey player
- Carmine Coppola (1910–1991), American composer
- Carmine Coppola (footballer) (born 1979), Italian footballer
- Carmine Crocco (1830–1905), Italian brigand
- Carmine Cucciniello (born 1988), Italian football player
- Carmine de Laurentiis, Italian mandolist
- Carmine DeSapio (1908–2004), American politician, Tammany Hall boss
- Carmine DeSopo (born 1940), American politician
- Carmine Di Giandomenico (born 1973), Italian visual artist
- Carmine Di Sibio (born 1963), American chief executive
- Carmine Esposito (born 1970), Italian footballer
- Carmine Fatico (1910–1991), American mobster
- Carmine Furletti (1926–2008), Brazilian football player
- Carmine Galante (1910–1979), American mobster
- Carmine Gallo (born 1965), American author
- Carmine Gallone (1885–1973), Italian film director
- Carmine Biagio Gatti (born 1988), Italian football player
- Carmine Gautieri (born 1970), Italian football coach
- Carmine Gentile, American politician
- Carmine Gentile (painter) (1678–1763), Italian painter
- Carmine Giordani (1685–1758), Italian composer
- Carmine Giordano (born 1982), Italian football player
- Carmine Giorgi (1910–1965), Brazilian athlete
- Carmine Giorgione (born 1991), Italian footballer
- Carmine Giovinazzo (born 1973), American actor
- Carmine Gorga (born 1935), Italian-American economist
- Carmine Gori-Merosi (1810–1886), Italian bishop
- Carmine Guida (born 1975), American musician
- Carmine Infantino (1925–2013), American comic book artist and editor
- Carmine Isacco (born 1970), Canadian soccer player
- Carmine Lombardozzi (1913–1992), American mobster
- Carmine J. Marasco (1891–1960), American politician and judge
- Carmine Marcantonio (born 1954), Canadian retired soccer player
- Carmine Mirabelli (1889–1951), Brazilian spiritual medium
- Carmine Molaro (born 1975), Italian boxer
- Carmine Nigro (1910–2001), American chess player
- Carmine Palumbo (born 1993), Italian footballer
- Carmine Pariante (born 1966), British psychiatrist
- Carmine Parlato (born 1970), Italian football manager
- Carmine Pecorelli (1928–1979), Italian journalist
- Carmine Persico (1933–2019), American mobster
- Carmine Preziosi (born 1943), Italian bicycler
- Carmine Recano (born 1980), Italian actor
- Carmine Rocco (1912–1982), Italian prelate
- Carmine Rojas (born 1953), American bassist
- Carmine Romano (1935–2011), American mobster
- Carmine Saponetti (1913–1990), Italian cyclist
- Carmine Savino (1911–1993), American politician
- Carmine Schiavone (1943–2015), Italian politician
- Carmine Sciandra (born 1952), American gangster
- Carmine Senise (1883–1958), Italian police officer
- Carmine Sessa (born 1951), Italian-American mobster
- Carmine Setola (born 1999), Italian footballer
- Carmine Starnino (born 1970), Canadian poet
- Carmine Tommasone (born 1984), Italian boxer
- Carmine Tramunti (1910–1978), Italian-American mobster
- Carmine Tucci (1933–1990), Italian ice hockey player
- Carmine Verduci (1959–2014), Italian-Canadian mobster
- Carmine Vingo (1929–2015), American boxer
- Carmine Zoccali (born 1947), Italian nephrologist

== Fictional characters ==
- Carmine, an alligator in the 2006 Disney animated film The Wild
- Carmine, the purple music race car and a character from the Disney animated TV series Little Einsteins season 2 episode Carmine's Big Race
- Carmine Falcone, a DC comics character.
- Carmine Lupertazzi, a character from the show The Sopranos
  - Little Carmine, Lupertazzi's son
- Carmine Lorenzo, the fictional airport Captain of Police in Die Hard 2 played by Dennis Franz
- Carmine "The Big Ragoo" Ragusa, a character from the show Laverne & Shirley
- Carmine, Cerise Hood's pet dire wolf from the Mattel franchise Ever After High
- Carmine, Family name in the games “Gears of War”
- Carmine Esclados, the main antagonist of the RWBY spinoff novel RWBY: After the Fall
- Carmine, a character from the video game Pokémon Scarlet and Violet's downloadable content expansion pack The Hidden Treasure of Area Zero

== See also ==
- Carmin (disambiguation), includes list of people with name Carmin
