= Carmen (given name) =

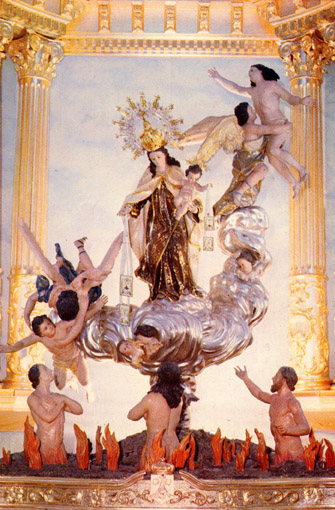
- Our Lady of Mount Carmel sculpture from Beniaján, Spain.
- Pronunciation: /ˈkɑːrmən/
- Gender: Unisex, predominantly female
- Name day: 16 July

Origin
- Origin: Hebrew and Latin, respectively
- Meaning: Song, Truthful, Poetry
- Region of origin: Mostly Spanish-speaking countries, Portuguese, Romania, Moldova, Italy, Scandinavia, the Low Countries, English, French, and German

Other names
- Nicknames: Carm, Carmie, Carcar
- Related names: Carmella, Carmela, Carmelita, Carmelo, Carmel, Carme, Carmina, Karmen, Karmin, Carman
- The "vineyard of God" origin is from Hebrew karmel; the "song" origin is from Latin carmen (3rd decl subst). The two origins are unrelated.

Carmen is a unisex given name in the Spanish language. It has two different origins, with its first root used as a nickname for Carmel, from Hebrew karmel meaning "vineyard of God", which is the name of a mountain range in Israel where the Biblical character Elijah challenged the prophets of the Tyranese god Baal. The second origin is from Latin carmen, which means "song" and is also the root of the English word "charm".

The name of the Roman goddess Carmenta based on this root comes from the purely Latin origin, as is the fragment of archaic Latin known as "Carmen Saliare". The name is generally female in Spanish (Carmen), Portuguese (Carmo), Catalan (Carme), and French and Romanian (Carmen)., with masculine features in the Italian language (Carmine).

== Spanish name ==
As a Spanish given name, it is usually part of the devotional compound names María del Carmen, Nuestra Señora del Carmen (Our Lady of Carmen), or Virgen del Carmen (in English, Our Lady of Mount Carmel), stemming from the tradition of the vision of Mary, mother of Jesus on 16 July 1251 by Simon Stock, head of the Carmelite order.

== People ==
- Carmen Aldunate (1940–2026), Chilean visual artist
- Carmen Alguindingue, Venezuelan professor and activist, appointed as ambassador to Andorra
- Carmen Aranegui (born 1945), Spanish archaeologist and university professor
- Carmen Argenziano, American actor
- Carmen Barth (1912–1985), American boxer
- Carmen Basilio, American professional boxer
- Carmen Bernand, French historian and Latin Americanist
- Carmen Blanco y Trigueros, Spanish writer, poet, journalist
- Carmen Bozello y Guzmán, Puerto Rican writer
- Carmen Bueno (disappeared 1974), Chilean missing woman
- Carmen Calisto, former Ecuadorian first lady
- Carmen Camacho (singer) (born 1939), Philippine Kundiman Diva
- Carmen Camacho (writer) (born 1976), Spanish writer of flash fiction and aphorisms
- Carmen Campagne (1959–2018), Canadian singer
- Carmen Carrera, American reality television personality, model and burlesque performer
- Carmen Cavallaro, American pianist
- Carmen Conde, Spanish poet
- Carmen Corley, American tennis player
- Carmen Cozza, American football and baseball player
- Carmen Damedoz (1890–1964), French dancer, artist's model and aviator
- Carmen Diana Deere (born 1945), American feminist economist
- Carmen Dorantes Martínez, Mexican politician
- Carmen Dragon, American conductor, composer and arranger
- Carmen Ennesch, Luxembourgish-French journalist, writer, and historian
- Carmen Espinoza-Rodriquez, American singer-songwriter
- Carmen Ejogo, British actress and singer
- Carmen Electra, American actress
- Carmen Everts (born 1968), German civil servant
- Carmen Fanzone, former Major League Baseball player and horn player
- Carmen Febres-Cordero de Ballén (1829–1893), Ecuadorian writer, poet
- Carmen Garayalde (1913–2002), Uruguayan teacher, exiled political activist, and artist
- Carmen García Bloise (1937–1994), Spanish trade unionist and politician
- Carmen Herrera, Cuban-born artist
- Carmen Hillinger, German Paralympic wheelchair fencer
- Carmen Kass, Estonian supermodel
- Carmen Labaki, Lebanese / Brazilian movie director and producer
- Carmen Laforet, Spanish author
- Carmen Lombardo, Canadian-American jazz saxophonist and vocalist
- Carmen Maciariello, American college basketball coach
- Carmen Maki, Japanese singer
- Carmen Martín Gaite, Spanish author
- Carmen Maura, Spanish actress
- Carmen McRae, American jazz singer
- Carmen Mican, Romanian handball player
- Carmen Milano, American lawyer and gangster
- Carmen Miranda, Portuguese-Brazilian samba singer and film star
- Carmen Nebel, German television presenter
- Carmen Olarte, Venezuelan voice actress
- Carmen Olmedo (1909–1985), Peruvian actress, dancer, songwriter, vedette
- Carmen A. Orechio, American politician
- Carmen Osbahr, American puppeteer
- Carmen Pata, American professional weightlifter
- Carmen Perrin (born 1953), Bolivian-born Swiss visual artist, designer, and educator
- Carmen Policy, American attorney and American football executive
- Carmen Pulver (born 1995), Swiss footballer
- Carmen Radu, former CEO of Eximbank Romania
- Carmen Rinke (born 1953), Canadian male boxer
- Carmen Rivera de Alvarado (1910–1973), Puerto Rican social worker, educator and activist
- Carmen Rizzo, American record producer
- Carmen Rodríguez (politician) (born 1949), Bolivian politician
- Carmen Rupe (1936–2011), New Zealand-Australian LGBT activist and drag-queen
- Carmen Salvino, American professional bowler
- Carmen Scardine, American football player
- Carmen Schentrup (2001–2018), one of the 17 victims who was killed in the Stoneman Douglas High School shooting
- Carmen Silva, Brazilian actress
- Carmen Silvera, British actress
- Carmen Sivoli, Venezuelan politician
- Carmen Sylva, pen name of Elisabeth of Wied, queen of Romania
- Carmen Suleiman, Egyptian singer
- Carmen Trutanich, American politician
- Carmen Inoa Vazquez (born 1942), Dominican psychologist, professor, and author
- Carmen Victoria Pérez (1941–2019), Venezuelan television hostess and broadcaster
- Carmen Vidal, Spanish cosmetologist
- Carmen Villalobos, Colombian actress
- Carmen J. Walters, American academic administrator and college president
- Carmen Zuleta, Venezuelan judge
- Carmen (born Nyoman Ayu Carmenita, 2006), Indonesian singer, member of the girl group Hearts2Hearts

== Fictional characters with the name Carmen ==
- Carmen, a recurring character on the American sitcom It's Always Sunny in Philadelphia
- Carmen, the main character in Prosper Mérimée's novella Carmen (1845), which is the basis for Georges Bizet's opera Carmen
- Carmen (Lana Del Rey song), titular character in a song by American singer-songwriter Lana Del Rey, taken from her second studio album Born to Die
- Carmen Diaz, a supporting character in Netflix's Cobra Kai in which she is the mother of Miguel Diaz and love interest of Johnny Lawrence (character)
- Carmen, a character from the movie, Happy Feet Two
- Carmen, a character from the 2002 Indonesian drama movie, Ada Apa Dengan Cinta
- Carmen, Humbert Humbert's term of endearment for the titular character of Nabokov's Lolita
- Carmen Cortez, a character from the Spy Kids trilogy
- Carmen de la Pica Morales, character on Showtime's lesbian drama, The L Word
- Carmen Diaz is an aspiring dancer, singer, and actress in the musical, Fame (musical)
- Carmen Lopez (character), a fictional character from the TV series, George Lopez
- Carmen Lowell, character from the Sisterhood of the Traveling Pants series
- Carmen Pryde, father of X-Men character Kitty Pryde
- Carmen Sandiego, character from the Where in the World is Carmen Sandiego? franchise
- Carmen Sternwood, a character in Raymond Chandler's The Big Sleep
- Carmen, supporting character of Totally Spies! in which she is the mother of super spy Alex
- Carmen, a villager in the Nintendo video game Animal Crossing
- Carmen, the main character in Colombian TV series, Always a Witch
- Carmen "Carmy" Berzatto, the main character in the American comedy-drama series The Bear (TV series)
- Carmen Agnelli, a supporting character in the Japanese light novel series Reign of the Seven Spellblades
- Carmen, a character, occurring in the Project Moon video games Lobotomy Corporation, Library of Ruina, Limbus Company, comics and novels

== See also ==
- Carmel
- Carmin (disambiguation), includes list of people with name Carmin
