= Carmen (disambiguation) =

Carmen is an 1875 opera by Georges Bizet.

Carmen may also refer to:

- Carmen (novella), an 1845 novella by Prosper Mérimée and the basis for Bizet's opera

== Arts and entertainment ==
=== Film ===
- Carmen (1913 film), by Stanner E. V. Taylor
- Carmen (1915 Cecil B. DeMille film)
- Carmen (1915 Raoul Walsh film)
- Carmen (1918 film), by Ernst Lubitsch
- Carmen (1926 film), by Jacques Feyder
- Carmen (1932 film), by Cecil Arthur Lewis
- Carmen (1942 film), by Christian-Jaque
- Carmen (1943 film), by Luis César Amadori
- Carmen (1953 film), by Giuseppe Maria Scotese
- Carmen (1983 film), by Carlos Saura
- Carmen (1984 film), by Francesco Rosi
- Carmen: A Hip Hopera, a 2001 television film by Robert Townsend
- Carmen (2003 Spanish film), by Vicente Aranda
- Carmen (2003 Russian film), by Aleksandr Khvan
- Carmen (2021 film), by Valerie Buhagiar
- Carmen (2022 film), by Benjamin Millepied

=== Music ===
- Carmen (band), a 1970s group
- Carmen (1973 Bernstein recording)
- Carmen (Barney Kessel album), 1959
- Carmen, an EP by Carmen Rasmusen
- "Carmen" (Lana Del Rey song), 2012
- "Carmen" (Stromae song), 2015
- "Carmen", a 1984 song by Malcolm McLaren from Fans, which also interpolates pieces from the opera Carmen
- "Carmen", a 1990 song by Anything Box from Peace
- "Carmen", a 2023 song by Olivia Dean from Messy
- "Carmen", a 1971 song by Ronnie Tober
- "Carmen", a 1964 guitar instrumental by Rob E.G.
- "Carmen", a 1968 instrumental by Herb Alpert and the Tijuana Brass
- Carmen: Duets & Arias, a 2010 album by Andrea Bocelli
- "Carmen Brasilia", a 1972 instrumental by Anarchic System

=== Other works ===
- Carmen (1949 ballet), by Roland Petit
- Carmen Suite (ballet), choreographed by Alberto Alonso, 1967, to music by Russian composer Rodion Shchedrin based on Bizet's opera
- Carmen (Wildhorn musical), 2008

== People ==
- Carmen (given name)
- Carmen (surname)

== Places ==
=== Philippines ===
- Carmen, Agusan del Norte
- Carmen, Bohol
- Carmen, Cebu
- Carmen, Cotabato
- Carmen, Davao del Norte
- Rosales, Pangasinan, sometimes called Carmen
- Carmen, Surigao del Sur
- Del Carmen, Surigao del Norte

=== United States ===
- Carmen, Arizona
- Carmen, Idaho
- Carmen, Oklahoma

=== Other places ===
- Carmen (municipality), Campeche, Mexico
- Carmen (district), San José Canton, Costa Rica
- Ciudad del Carmen, Campeche, Mexico
- Carmen, Uruguay
- Alto del Carmen, Atacama Region, Chile
- Karmøy (island) or Carmen, an island of Norway
- Playa del Carmen, a city in Quintana Roo state, Mexico
- Carmen de Patagones, Argentina

== Other uses ==
- Carmen (verse), the Latin word for "chant", "song", and hence "lyrics" or "poem"
- Hispano-Suiza Carmen, an electric sports car
- List of storms named Carmen
- Spanish ship Carmén, more than one Spanish Navy ship
- Carmen, a townhouse located on 33, Cathedral Street, Sliema, Malta

== See also ==
- El Carmen (disambiguation)
- Carman (disambiguation)
- Carmin (disambiguation)
- Carmine (disambiguation)
