= Carmel =

Carmel may refer to:

- Carmel (biblical settlement), an ancient Israelite town in Judea
- Mount Carmel, a coastal mountain range in Israel overlooking the Mediterranean Sea
- Carmelites, a Roman Catholic mendicant religious order

Carmel may also refer to:

== Arts, entertainment, and media ==
- Carmel (band), an English jazz/soul musical group
- Carmel (film), a 2011 film starring Josh Hutcherson and Hayden Panettiere
- Carmel: Who Killed Maria Marta?, a 2020 Argentinian true crime documentary miniseries directed by Alejandro Hartmann

== Businesses ==
- Carmel Agrexco, an Israeli exporter of agricultural produce
- Carmel Winery, an Israeli vineyard and winery
- Autocars Co. or Carmel automobile, an Israeli manufacturer of fiberglass-shelled cars

== Places ==
=== Australia ===
- Carmel, Western Australia, a suburb of Perth, Western Australia

=== Israel and Near East ===
- Carmel, Mount Hebron, an Israeli settlement in the West Bank
- Carmel City, a Druze town in Haifa, Israel
- Carmel Market, an outdoor market in Tel Aviv, Israel
- al-Karmil, a Palestinian village and modern-day successor to the biblical Carmel in Judea
- French Carmel, a neighborhood in Haifa, Israel

=== Spain ===
- El Carmel, a district in Barcelona, Catalonia

=== Philippines ===
- Carmel Mall, in Canlubang, Laguna

=== United States ===
- Carmel-by-the-Sea, California, or "Carmel"
- Carmel Highlands, California
- Carmel Mission (Mission San Carlos Borromeo de Carmelo), a Spanish mission located in Monterey County, California
- Carmel River (California), a river in Monterey County, California
- Carmel Valley (disambiguation)
- Carmel Valley Village, California
- Carmel Valley, San Diego, California
- Carmel, Indiana, the largest place with the name
- Carmel, Maine
- Carmel, New York
  - Carmel (hamlet), New York
- Carmel, Ohio
- Carmel Formation, a rock unit in Utah
- Carmel, West Virginia
- Carmel, Wisconsin

=== Wales ===
- Carmel, Anglesey
- Carmel, Carmarthenshire
- Carmel, Flintshire
- Carmel, Gwynedd
- Carmel Chapel, Penrhiwceiber, Rhondda Cynon Taf
- Carmel Chapel, Trecynon, Rhondda Cynon Taf

== People ==
- Carmel Bakurski (born 1976), Australian field hockey defender
- Carmel Kaine (1937–2013), Australian classical violinist
- Carmel Kallemaa (born 1997), Canadian rhythmic gymnast
- Carmel McCourt (born 1958), English singer
- Carmel Muscat (1961–2025), Maltese cyclist
- Carmel Myers (1899–1980), American actress
- Carmel Naughton (fl. 1980s–present), Irish philanthropist
- Carmel O'Shannessy, Australian linguistics professor
- Carmel Robichaud, politician and retired teacher in New Brunswick, Canada
- Carmel Sepuloni (born 1977), New Zealand politician
- Eddie Carmel (1936–1972), Israeli-born entertainer, popularly known as "The Jewish Giant"
- John Carmel Heenan (1905–1975), English prelate of the Roman Catholic Church
- Roger C. Carmel (1932–1986), American character actor
- Roberta Karmel (1937–2024), American attorney, law professor, and commissioner of the U.S. Securities and Exchange Commission

== Other uses ==
- Carmel & District Cricket Club, a North Wales village cricket team at Flintshire
- Carmel daisy, a flowering plant in the honeysuckle family
- Carmel Formation, a Middle Jurassic rock unit in the southwestern United States
- i840 'Carmel', a 1999 chipset for Pentium processors
- IWI Carmel, Israeli assault rifle
- Nvidia Carmel, a 2018 CPU macro design from Nvidia
- KARMEL, a mnemonic for causes of high anion gap metabolic acidosis
- Carmel Kazemi, a fictional character from the British soap opera EastEnders
- Carmel McQueen, a fictional character from the British soap opera Hollyoaks
- Storm Carmel, a 2021 storm that affected Cyprus and Israel

== See also ==
- Carmel School (disambiguation)
- Mount Carmel (disambiguation), places named after Mount Carmel, Israel
- Caramel, a confection
- Carmeleno (disambiguation)
- Carmen (given name), a diminutive nickname for Carmel
- Karmel (name), list of people with a similar name
- Karmiel
