= Carman (surname) =

Carman is a surname. Notable people with the surname include:

- Anja Čarman (born 1985), Slovenian swimmer
- Bliss Carman (1861–1929), Canadian poet
- Brynn Carman (born 1994), American pair skater
- Dillon Carman (born 1986), Canadian professional boxer and reality television personality
- Don Carman (born 1959), American baseball player
- Ezra A. Carman (1834–1909), United States Army officer
- George Carman (1929–2001), English barrister
- George F. Carman (1827–1891), American politician
- Gregory W. Carman (1937–2020), United States Representative from New York
- Harry Carman (fl. 1940s), American historian
- James Carman (1876–?), English footballer
- Jon Carman (born 1976), American football player
- Katharine Woodley Carman (1906–1992), American petroleum geologist
- Nancy Carman (born 1950), American ceramist
- Patrick Carman (born 1966), American novelist
- Phil Carman (born 1950), Australian rules footballer
- Syd Carman (1901–?), Australian rules footballer
- Taylor Carman (born 1965), American philosopher

== See also ==
- Carmen (surname)
- Carmon, surname
- Carmin (disambiguation), includes list of people with name Carmin
