= Karmen (name) =

Karmen is both a surname and a given name. Notable people with the name include:

Surname:

- Roman Karmen (1906–1978), Soviet war camera-man and film director
- Steve Karmen (born 1937), American composer

Given name:

- Karmen Sunčana Lovrić (born 1986), Croatian actress
- Karmen Mar (born 1987), Slovenian chess player
- Karmen McNamara (born 1983), Canadian triathlete
- Karmen Pedaru (born 1990), Estonian fashion model
- Karmen Stavec (born 1973), Slovene singer

== See also ==
- Carmen (given name)
- Carmen (surname)
- Karien
