= Carmelita (name) =

- Pronunciation: kär'mə-lē'tə
- Gender: female

Origin
- Origin: Spanish
- Meaning: "Carmelite"
- Region of origin: English- and Spanish-speaking countries

Other names
- Related names: Carmelito, Carmelina, Carmelino, Carmella, Carmela, Carmelo, Carmel, Carmen, Carmina, Carmine, Carmo, Carme
- Also used as a nickname for Carmel.

Carmelita is a feminine given name in Spanish, Filipino and English.

Notable people with this name include:

- Carmelita Abalos (born 1962), Filipino politician
- Carmelita Abdurahman, Filipino academic in the field of linguistics
- Carmelita Correa (born 1988), Mexican track and field athlete
- Carmelita Geraghty (1901–1966), American silent-film actress and painter
- Carmelita González (1928–2010), Mexican actress
- Carmelita Hinton (1890–1983), American educator
- Carmelita Jeter (born 1979), retired American sprinter
- Carmelita Little Turtle, Apache/Tarahumara photographer
- Carmelita Maracci (1908–1987), American dancer and choreographer
- Carmelita Namashulua (born 1962), Mozambican teacher and politician
- Carmelita Pope (1924–2019), American actress
- Carmelita Torres, Mexican human rights activist
- Carmelita Vigil-Schimmenti (born 1936), retired officer of the United States Air Force
