= Carmella =

- Gender: Female

Origin
- Origin: Hebrew
- Meaning: Garden
- Region of origin: Italy, English-speaking countries

Other names
- Related names: Carmilla, Carmelita, Carmelito, Carmelina, Carmelino, Carmela, Carmelo, Camilla, Carmel, Carmen, Carmina, Carmine, Carmo, Carme

Carmella is a female given name. Notable people with the name include:

== People ==
- Carmella DeCesare, a playmate for Playboy magazine
- Carmella Flöck, a courier for the Austrian Resistance during the Anschluss of 1938–1945.
- Carmella Marcella Garcia, Miss Continental Plus 1995
- Carmella Sabaugh, an American politician
- Carmella (wrestler), ring name of professional wrestler Leah Van Dale

== Fictional characters ==
- Carmilla, a fictional vampire written in 1871 from the novel of the same name. Written by Sheridan Le Fanu
- Carmella Cammeniti, a fictional character from the soap opera Neighbours
- Carmella Unuscione, a fictional villain associated with the X-Men

== See also ==
- Carmela (disambiguation)
- Carmelle (disambiguation)
- Caramella (disambiguation)
