= Carme =

Carme may refer to:

- Carme (given name)
- Carme (moon), a moon of Jupiter
- Carme (mythology), a figure in Greek mythology
- Carme group, a group of satellites orbiting Jupiter
- Carme, Barcelona, a village in Barcelona province, Catalonia, Spain
- "Carmè", song by Ernesto de Curtis (1875–1937)

== See also ==
- Carmen (surname)
