= El Carmen =

El Carmen may refer to:

== Argentina ==
- El Carmen, Jujuy, capital of El Carmen Department, Jujuy Province

== Bolivia ==
- El Carmen (Santa Cruz), a town in Santa Cruz Department, Bolivia

== Chile ==
- El Carmen, a commune and town in Ñuble Region, Central Chile
- El Carmen mine, an iron mine in Atacama Region, northern Chile

== Colombia ==
- El Carmen, Santander a municipality in the Santander Department
- El Carmen de Atrato, a municipality in the Chocó Department
- El Carmen del Darién, a municipality in the Chocó Department
- El Carmen, Norte de Santander, a municipality in the Norte de Santander Department
- El Carmen de Bolívar, a municipality in the Bolivar Department

== Costa Rica ==
- Carmen District, San José, a district in the San José canton

== Ecuador ==
- El Carmen Canton

== El Salvador ==
- El Carmen, Cuscatlán, a municipality in the Cuscatlán department
- El Carmen, La Unión, a municipality in La Unión Department
- Iglesia El Carmen, a church in the city of Santa Tecla, El Salvador

== Mexico ==
- El Carmen (Mexibús), a BRT station in Ecatepec de Morelos
- El Carmen, Nuevo León, a town and municipality in Nuevo León, Mexico

== Peru ==
- El Carmen (San Juan Bautista), a town in San Juan Bautista district, Ica Province, Ica Region
- El Carmen District, Chincha, a district in the Chincha Province within Ica Region

== Spain ==
- El Carmen (Madrid Metro), a Madrid Metro station
- Barri del Carme, in the historical center of the city of València

== See also ==
- Battle of El Carmen, a battle of the Chaco War
- Carmen (disambiguation)
