= Cartman (disambiguation) =

Eric Cartman is a central character from the adult animated series South Park.

Cartman may also refer to:

- Cartman (band), an Australian band 1997–2003
- Cartman (surname), a surname

== South Park ==
- Other characters in South Park with the surname Cartman
- Liane Cartman, a central character from the adult animated series South Park

== See also ==
- Carman (disambiguation)
- Carmen (disambiguation)
- Cartmanland
