= Mark Glanville =

English classical singer and writer

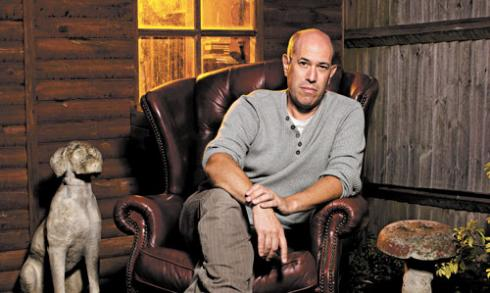
- Glanville at his old house in London, 2009
- Born: London, England
- Occupation: Singer/Writer
- Website: www.yiddishwinterreise.com

Mark Glanville (born London, England) is an English singer and writer. He grew up in West London with his father, the writer Brian Glanville.

== Writer ==
Mark chronicled his early life, including flirtations with the world of football hooliganism, studying Classics and Philosophy at Oxford University and forging an operatic career as a bass-baritone with Opera North, Scottish Opera, Lisbon Opera and New Israeli Opera among others, in his memoir The Goldberg Variations, published by HarperCollins in 2003 and shortlisted for the Wingate Prize for Jewish Literature and the National Sporting Club Award. In his memoir Glanville suggests that his interest in football violence had ended by the time of his marriage to the soprano Julia Melinek, but he later confessed to being drawn back into that world via the notorious hooligan firms of Millwall in south London. An article referencing that experience, in the Sunday Times, led to numerous almost entirely condemnatory readers comments. In the final chapter of his memoir Glanville claimed to have found his true identity as a Jew. Glanville's recent writing has focused on the literature of the Holocaust. In November 2020 he was commissioned to write a feature for the Times Literary Supplement celebrating the centenary of the great Romanian, German-language poet, Paul Celan. He has also written frequently on the Vilna Yiddish poet Abraham Sutzkever.

== Opera ==
Among his opera recordings Glanville sang the role of Armando in Donizetti's L'assedio di Calais for Opera Rara.

== Yiddish song ==
His later work as a singer moved away from the opera house towards the recital hall with the song cycle Yiddish Winterreise – A Holocaust Survivor’s Inner Journey told through Yiddish song, released on the Naxos label in 2010. Using songs from the Yiddish folk tradition, many in original arrangements by the composer/accompanist Alexander Knapp, Glanville took Schubert's Winterreise "as a symbol for the destruction of home and family". The programme was performed at the Kennedy Center in Washington, D.C. under the auspices of Pro Musica Hebraica. It was reprised in March 2024 at Kings Place for the Jewish Literary Foundation, with pianist Marc Verter.

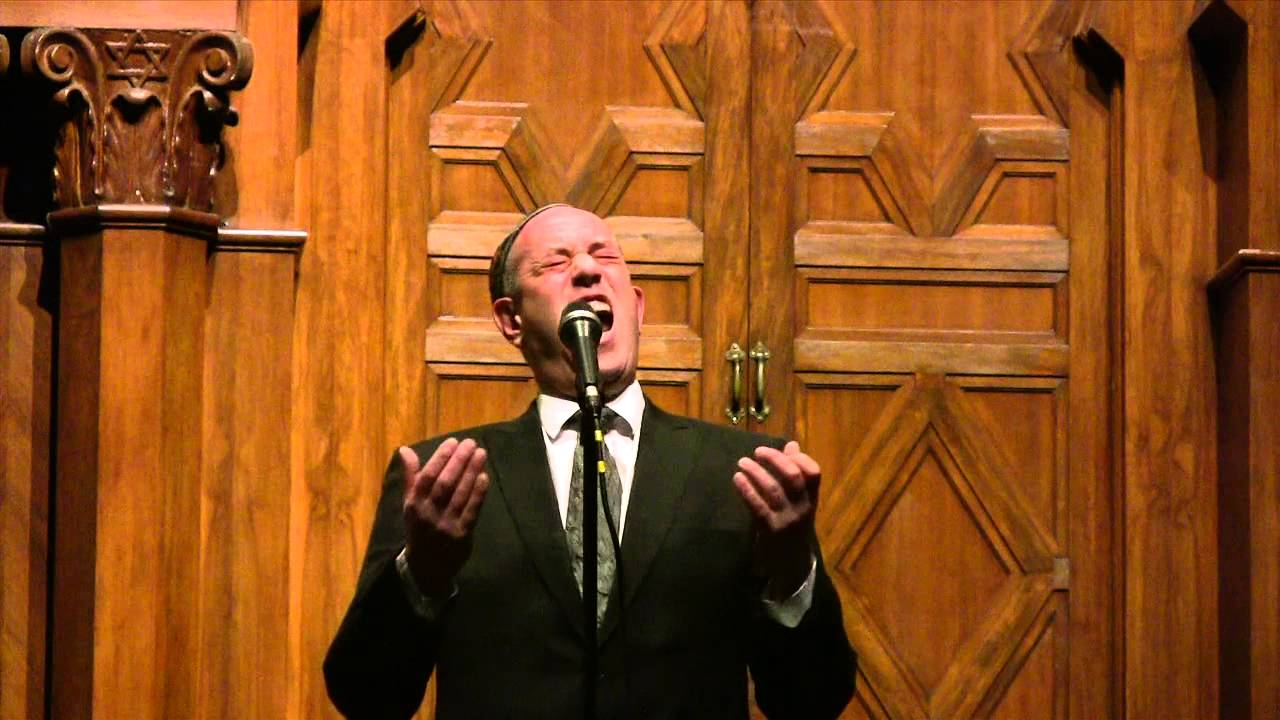
Glanville performing a Yiddish Winterreise

A second programme of Yiddish song Di Sheyne Milnerin – A Yiddish Die Schöne Müllerin was released on the Nimbus label in 2012 and performed live at Symphony Space, New York City in 2011 and St John's, Smith Square in October 2012. Glanville returned to the Kennedy Center in March 2016 to perform songs by Salomon Sulzer for Pro Musica Hebraica in the programme, 'Wandering Stars'.

== Mieczysław Weinberg ==
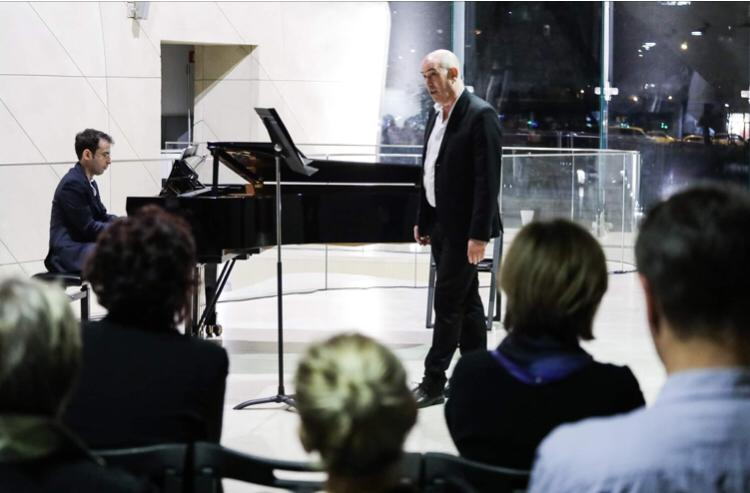
Mark Glanville and Mark Verter performing Weinberg at Polin Museum

On 8 November 2018, Mark Glanville and Mark Verter (pianist) gave their first performance of Citizen of Nowhere: A Sung Life, a programme devoted to the songs of Mieczysław Weinberg at the Martin Harris Centre, Manchester University followed by a performance at the Purcell Room on 3 February 2019. Glanville was subsequently invited to perform Weinberg songs for Israeli Opera in April 2019 and again with Marc Verter on Weinberg's 100th birthday, 8 December 2019, as part of the Polin Museum Warsaw's centennial celebrations for Weinberg which also featured Gidon Kremer and the Kremerata. 'Barbaric Verses', a new programme developed with pianist Marc Verter, inspired by the life and work of Weinberg, focused on the music and poetry of composers and writers living under totalitarian regimes. It debuted at Kings Place in February 2023 and was subsequently performed at The Sholem Asch Festival in Kutno, home to a quarter of Glanville's ancestors, in September 2023.

== Amaraterra ==
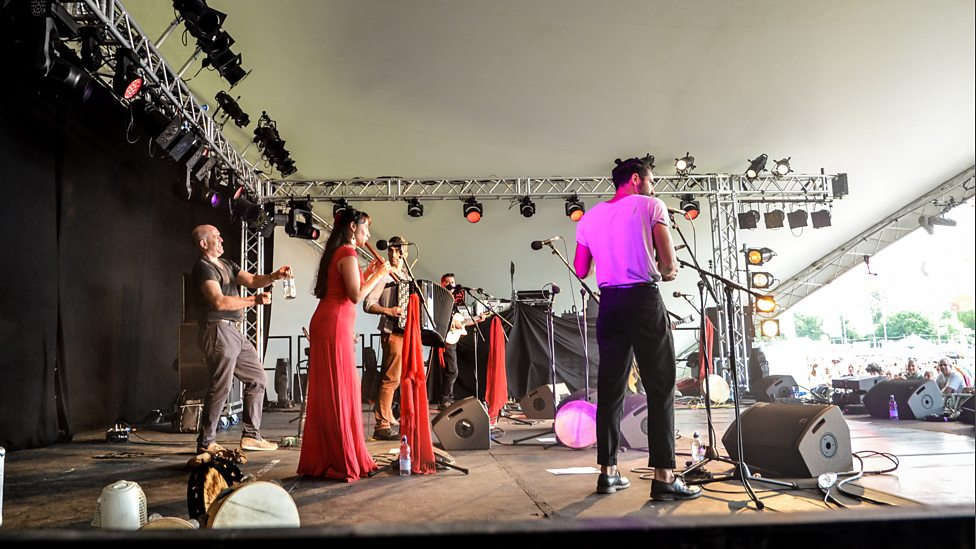
Mark Glanville playing the glass bottle with Amaraterra at WOMAD

Since 2008, Glanville has been focusing on the history and traditions of the Italian region of Apulia, and performing as a singer and ciaramella player with the first London-based pizzica and southern Italian traditional music group, Amaraterra. After appearing on BBC Radio 3's World on 3 the group were invited to perform at WOMAD in July 2016. They returned to WOMAD in 2022 to run the Malmesbury Schools Project and to perform on the Charlie Gillet stage in 2023. On 9 November 2017 they supported Sud Sound System at Brixton Jamm. On 2 July 2019 Glanville opened the Pantelleria Festival 'La Musica e il Vento' with songs from different Mediterranean traditions (including Puglia and Sicily) accompanied by Stelios Katsatsidis, accordion-player for Amareterra.

Amaraterra were at the centre of a media storm in December 2020, after claiming that their offer to appear on the BBC's 'Strictly Come Dancing' spin-off programme, 'It Takes Two', was withdrawn once they asked for a fee.

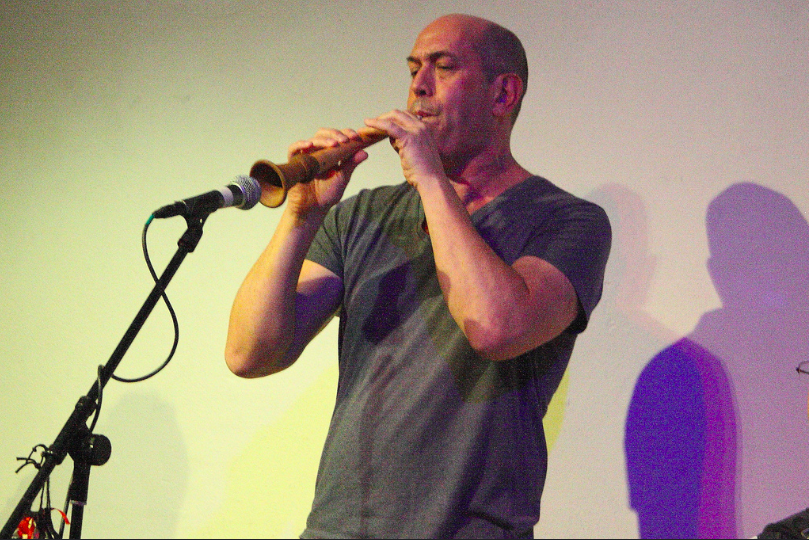
Glanville playing the Ciaramella
