= Carmen Rodríguez (disambiguation) =

Carmen Rodríguez (born 1948) is a Chilean-Canadian political and social activist.

Carmen Rodríguez may also refer to:

- Carmen Rodríguez (politician) (born 1949), Bolivian politician
- Carmen Rodríguez (fencer), (born 1972), Guatemalan fencer
