= Carman (disambiguation) =

Carman is a goddess in Irish mythology.

Carman may also refer to:

== Places ==
- Carman, Manitoba, a town in Canada
- Carman (electoral district), in the Canadian province of Manitoba
- Carman, Illinois, a town in the United States
- Carman Township, Henderson County, Illinois, a township based around Carman, Illinois

== Transportation ==
- Carman (South) Airport, an airport near Carman, Manitoba
- Carman/Friendship Field Airport, an airport near Carman, Manitoba
- Carman Subdivision, a railroad line in New York
- Carman, a driver of a heavy horse-drawn vehicle or early motorised heavy goods vehicle

== Other uses ==
- Carman (surname)
- Carman (singer) (1956–2021), American Christian singer
- Car-Man, a Russian pop band

== See also ==
- Carmen (disambiguation)
- Carmin (disambiguation)
- Cartman (disambiguation)
