= Zoccali =

Zoccali is an Italian surname. Notable people with the surname include:

- Carmine Zoccali (born 1947), Italian physician
- Manuela Zoccali, Italian astronomer
