= Carmelle =

Carmelle is a given name. Notable people with the name include:

- Carmelle Collado (born 2007), Filipina singer
- Carmelle Robert (born 1962), Quebec astrophysicist, starburst researcher and professor

== See also ==
- Carmella (disambiguation)
- Carmelo (given name)
