= Cartman (surname) =

Cartman is a surname, meaning someone who drives a cart or wagon. Notable people with the surname include:

- William Cartman (1861–1935), English first-class cricketer
- Bert Cartman (1900–1955), English footballer

== Fictional ==
- Eric Cartman, one of the four boys in the television series South Park
- Liane Cartman, Eric's mother in South Park

== See also ==
- Cartman (disambiguation)
