= Carmelo (disambiguation) =

Carmelo is a given name.

Carmelo may also refer to:

- CARMELO, a program written by Nate Silver to predict the future performance of NBA players
- Carmelo, Uruguay
- Carmelo (film), a film by Jorge R. Gutierrez
