= Carmine (surname) =

Carmine is a surname. Notable people with the name include:

- Michael Carmine (1959–1989), American actor
- Laura Carmine (born 1983), Puerto Rican-born actress

Fictional characters

- Anthony Carmine, character from Gears of War video game
- Benjamin Carmine, Anthony Carmine's younger brother in Gears of War 2
- Carmilla Carmine, character from Hazbin Hotel
- Clayton Carmine, Anthony Carmine and Benjamin Carmine's older brother in Gears of War 3
- Lizzie Carmine, daughter of the 4th unnamed Carmine brother, present in Gears of War 5

== See also ==
- Renato De Carmine (1923–2010) Italian actor
- Samuel Di Carmine (born 1988), Italian footballer
- Carmin (disambiguation), includes list of people with name Carmin
