= Caramella (disambiguation) =

Caramella is a 2010 studio album by the Italian singer Mina.

Caramella may also refer to:

- Caramella, a fictional character in the Italian comedy film Scandal in Sorrento, played by Tina Pica
- Candy Caramella, a fictional character in the French animated series Space Goofs
- Count Caramella (it. Il conte Caramella, ru. Граф Карамелла), an opera by Baldassare Galuppi
- Doto caramella, a species of gastropod within the genus Doto

== People with the surname ==
- Alberto Caramella (1928–2007), an Italian poet and lawyer
- Riccardo Caramella, Italian pianist, the first Western pianist to perform Xian Xinghai's Yellow River Concerto in China with a Chinese orchestra

== See also ==
- Caramella Girls, a Swedish musical group
- Miriam Caramella Josephine Battista (1912–1980), an American actress known for her early career as a child star in silent films
- Carmella, a given name
- Ciaramella, surname
