= Carmeleno =

Carmeleno may refer to:

- Carmeleno people, or Rumsen, an ethnic group of California
- Carmeleno language, or Rumsen, a language of California

== See also ==
- Camaleño, a municipality in Spain
- Camerlengo, an Italian title
- Carmel (disambiguation)
