= Carmon =

Carmon is a surname. Notable people with the surname include:

- Amalia Kahana-Carmon, Israeli writer
- Arye Carmon, Israeli academic
- Daniel Carmon (born 1951), Israeli diplomat
- Dominic Carmon, American Roman Catholic prelate
- Irin Carmon, Israel-American blogger
- Tim Carmon, American keyboardist
- Yigal Carmon, founder of Middle East Media Research Institute
- Yosef Carmon, Israeli actor
- Ziv Carmon, Israeli academic

== See also ==
- Carmon, Maryland
- Carman, surname
- Carmen (surname)
- Carmin (disambiguation), includes list of people with name Carmin
