= 1917 Bath riots =

Border dispute between U.S. and Mexico

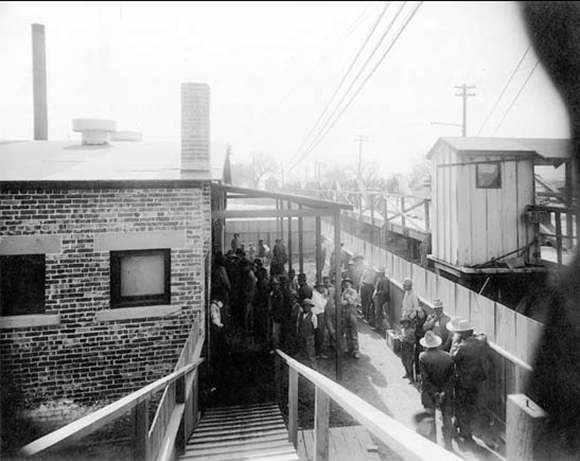
El Paso disinfection station and Mexicans waiting to be de-loused at the international bridge at the US immigration station

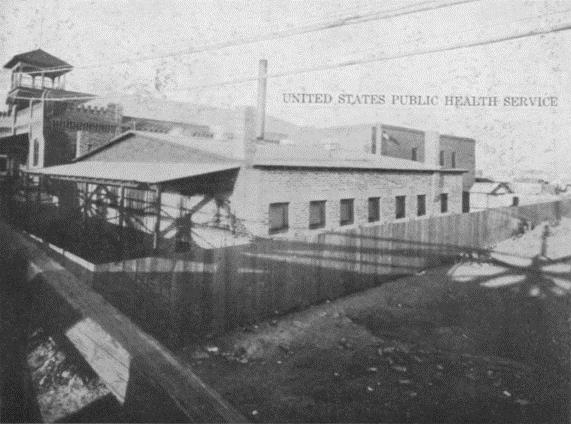
Side view of the El Paso disinfecting plant and yard of the US immigration station

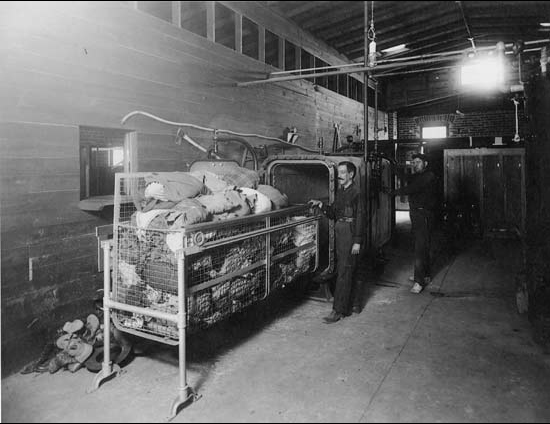
Clothing being readied for steam de-lousing at the El Paso disinfection plant of the US immigration station

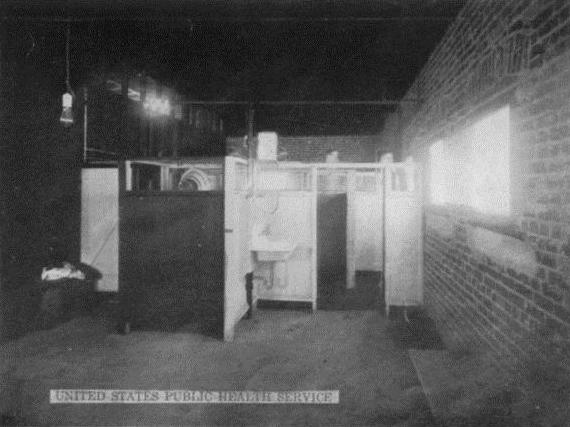
Women's baths at the El Paso disinfecting plant of the US immigration station

The 1917 Bath Riots occurred in January 1917 at the Santa Fe Street Bridge between El Paso, Texas, United States, and Ciudad Juárez, Chihuahua, Mexico. The riots are known to have been started by Carmelita Torres and lasted from January 28 to January 30 and were sparked by new immigration policies at the El Paso–Juárez Immigration and Naturalization Service office, requiring Mexicans crossing the border to take de-lousing baths and be vaccinated. Reports of nude photographs of women bathers and fear of potential fire from the kerosene baths led Carmelita Torres to refuse to submit to the procedure. Denied a refund of her transport fare, she began yelling at the officials and convinced other riders to join her. After three days, the discontent subsided, but the disinfections of Mexicans at the U.S. border continued for forty years.

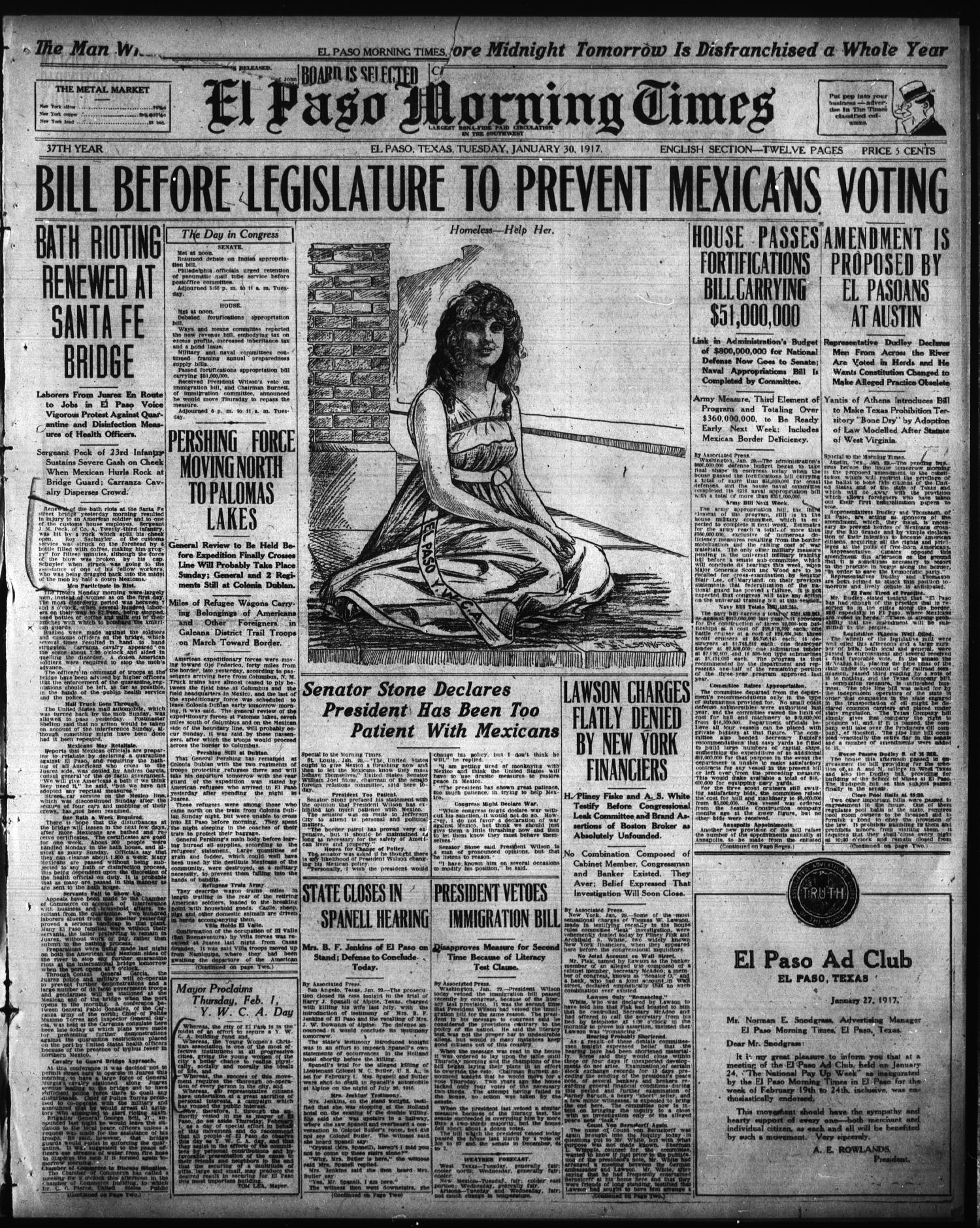
El Paso Morning Times, El Paso, Texas, January 30, 1917, Headlinedː "Bill Before Congress to Prevent Mexicans Voting" depicts the bath riots begun by Carmelita Torres at the Santa Fe International Bridge disinfecting plant at the border between El Paso and Ciudad Juárez.

== Background ==
By 1914, Venustiano Carranza had been sworn into office as Mexico's head of state ending the main fighting of the Mexican Revolution. U.S. President Woodrow Wilson, tired of the fighting and being more concerned with events unfolding in Europe and World War I, withdrew American forces from Mexico. Mexican revolutionary Pancho Villa refused to give up the fight and continued to execute border skirmishes. Between 1915 and 1917, typhus (which was sometimes reported as typhoid fever) spread from Mexico City to the provinces from Veracruz to Jalisco. In September 1916, Carranza called for a constitutional convention to end the conflict and bring peace to Mexico. The convention ended simultaneously with the end of the riots, on January 31, 1917, and subsequently the new constitution was signed on February 5.

During the same period, Thomas Calloway Lea Jr. was elected as the mayor of El Paso, Texas. Lea sent telegrams to U.S. Senators in Washington demanding a quarantine be put in place to stem the tide of "dirty lousey destitute Mexicans" who would spread typhus into El Paso. The Public Health Service Officer for El Paso, Dr. B. J. Lloyd, admitted there was little danger and opposed a quarantine, but suggested opening de-lousing plants. U.S. officials quickly adopted a policy of sanitizing Mexican immigrants at a disinfecting station in El Paso. The policy initially applied to all Mexicans entering the United States at El Paso, but soon spread to the Laredo–Nuevo Laredo crossing, and eventually along the entire U.S. Mexico border.

Historians have long connected sanitation policies along the US-Mexico border to broader public health and immigration debates during the early twentieth century. During this time period, there were concerns expressed by United States officials about the spread of diseases such as typhus, particularly within regions higher levels of border migration. Scholars such as, Alexandra Mina Stern and Natalia Molina have contended that the health measures were also driven by present-day ideologies about immigration, race, social hygiene that were customary in public law during the Progressive Era. Historian David Dorado Romo notes that public officials at El Paso consistently associated Mexican migrants with disease and unsanitary conditions during this time period, especially during the increased migration during the Mexican Revolution. Romo also goes on to document how Mayor Tom Lea frequently urged for stronger quarantine measures at the El Paso border because of the fears surrounding typhus and immigration.

The procedures of sanitation that were implemented in the El Paso border proved to be a larger effort by American officials in order to control the movement of immigrants coming to the United States. Scholars have pointed out that these procedures mainly targeted Mexican migrants who found themselves crossing the border for travel or work. These health procedures were deemed to be necessary by public officials, but some migrants and observers condemned the inspections due to just how invasive they were and the utilization of chemicals during the disinfection process. Historian David Dorado Romo asserts that Mexican migrants crossing the Santa Fe Bridge were mandated to undergo a process of stream drying, chemical fumigations, chemical inspections, and delousing before coming into the United States.

Men were separated from women and children into separate buildings, where they were stripped of all clothing and valuables. Most clothing and valuables were steamed. Other items which might be damaged by steam (like shoes, hats, or belts) were exposed to cyanogen gas. Attendants examined the nude people for lice. The officers conducting the strip searches were rumored to have photographed the nude women and shared the photos to others at bars. When lice were found on a man, the man's hair was clipped close to his head and the clippings were burned. For a woman, the hair was doused in a mixture of vinegar and kerosene, wrapped in a towel, and left on the hair for at least 30 minutes. If lice were found on re-inspection, the process was repeated. Once attendants declared the lice test had been "passed", the naked people were gathered in a bathing area and sprayed with a liquid soap made of soap chips and kerosene oil. After collecting their sanitized clothing and dressing, migrants were evaluated by a foreman, vaccinated and given a certificate that they had completed the procedure. From the disinfecting area, migrants then entered the Immigration and Naturalization Service building for processing.

== Riot ==
Around 7:30 a.m. on January 28, 1917, the riot began when inspectors attempted to remove Mexican women from their trolley, which they were riding to work. Ordered to disembark and submit to the disinfection process, 17-year-old Carmelita Torres refused, having heard reports that nude women were being photographed while in the baths. Reports had also circulated that bathers might be set on fire, as had happened the previous year when gasoline baths at the El Paso City Jail had resulted in the death of 28 inmates when a cigarette ignited bathers. She requested permission to enter without submitting to bathing and was refused. She then demanded a refund of her fare and upon refusal of a refund convinced the other women on her cable car to protest. The women began shouting and hurling stones at health and immigration officials, sentries and civilians, who had gathered to watch the disturbance. The majority of the early protesters were young, domestic workers employed in homes in El Paso but as the crowd grew to several thousand a mixture of people became involved. Four trolleys which had made early morning runs to collect workers on the Juárez side were seized and did not return to the El Paso side until mid-afternoon.

Around 10 o'clock, General Andrés G. García drove to the center of the bridge to try to quiet the mob and was only partially successful, as the mob tried to prevent his car from leaving the Mexican side. By the afternoon, when it was clear that those who had entered the baths were not being harmed, the crowds were finally dispersed by mounted soldiers on each side of the border. One cable car motorman and a mail coach driver were reported to have been beaten by rioters and several media movie makers were attacked. Despite rumors that someone had been shot, Mexican authorities denied the event and reported that no serious injuries resulted.

On the 29th rioting continued, but this time, the majority of rioters were men. Newspapers reported that the men were taking advantage of the bath disturbance to protest the Carranza regime and voice support for his rival Pancho Villa. Ciudad Juárez Police Chief Máximo Torres ordered all rioters arrested and the Mexican cavalry dispersed the rioters from the bridge. Business owners and households who were without laborers consulted with the Chamber of Commerce to resolve the issues promptly as most workers refused to come to work. Officials clarified that those who were not infected could be passed without having to bathe and that certificates were valid for a week.

By January 30, precautionary measures taken by authorities on both sides of the border had quelled the rioting. Two men and one woman were arrested at the American side of the bridge for assaulting a customs officer and an infantryman, but no further violence was reported. Policemen from Juárez monitored the southern end of the bridge crossing, a Mexican health inspector Andrés García was present to maintain respectful treatment at the disinfection plant, and street car service between the two cities was suspended. Notices had been posted in Juárez to advise that the inspectors in El Paso would accept health certificates issued by Mexican health inspectors.

== Legacy ==
=== Immigration impact ===
Though significant figures like Carmelita Torres later became linked with the resistance to border sanitation practices of delousing, the occurrences of the Bath Riots had a minor immediate effect on the policy of immigration. The Immigration Act of 1917 passed just days after the riots and introduced new restrictions on migrants entering the United States, which included restrictions like literacy tests, head taxes, and limitations on contract labor. During World War I, few restrictions on Mexican borders were provisionally relaxed due to the labor shortages that occurred in the American Southwest. With the help of businessmen, they were able to lift the 1917 immigration terms for Mexican workers, and the exemption lasted until 1921.

=== Long-term Border Practices ===
Border sanitation and fumigation procedures were ongoing for multiple decades following the riots. By the 1920's and 1930's, officials started to use additional chemical treatments, including DDT and Zyklon B in order to disinfect clothing, as well as personal belongings. Historians have recognized these delousing practices as part of a more extensive expansion of border ordinance and public health enforcement during the twentieth century. As stated by Romo, the disinfection procedures throughout the US-Mexico border continued into the 1950s, specifically during the Bracero era, where migrant laborers were subjected to chemical and fumigation spraying at border crossings. Romo asserts that the sanitation practices mirrored the continued relationship between immigration enforcement and public health inspection policies as seen throughout the twentieth century.

=== Historical Memory ===
For the large part of the twentieth century, the Bath Riots received limited historical and public attention. In 2006, Historian David Dorado Romo published Ringside Seat to a Revolution which reignited the interest of the events among historians and Chicano studies scholars. Later in 2006, National Public Radio featured a segment discussing the Bath Riots and the pivotal role that Carmelita Torres played in bringing national attention to the issue. Since then, scholars have increasingly widened their historical lens when examining the Bath Riots to the broader histories of border enforcement, immigration policy, and public health in the United States.
