= Carmel School =

Carmel School, Carmel College or Carmel High School may refer to:

== Carmel College ==
=== Australia ===
- Carmel Adventist College, a Seventh-day Adventist day college in Perth, Western Australia
- Carmel College, Thornlands, a Catholic secondary college in Redland City, Queensland

=== India ===
- Carmel College, Mala, a Christian college for girls in Mala, Kerala

=== New Zealand ===
- Carmel College, Auckland, a Catholic school for girls in Auckland

=== United Kingdom ===
- Carmel College, Darlington, a Catholic school in Darlington, England
- Carmel College, Oxfordshire, a defunct Jewish independent school in Wallingford, England
- Carmel College (St Helens), a Catholic sixth form college in Merseyside, England

== Carmel High School ==
=== India ===
- Carmel Garden Matriculation Higher Secondary School, a school in Coimbatore, Tamil Nadu
- Carmel Higher Secondary School, a Catholic school in Ramanputhoor, Tamil Nadu

=== United States ===
- Carmel High School (Carmel, California), a school in Carmel, California
- Carmel High School (Carmel, New York), a public high school in Carmel, New York
- Carmel High School (Indiana), a public high school in Carmel, Indiana
- Carmel High School (Mundelein, Illinois), a Catholic high school in Mundelein, Illinois

=== In fiction ===
- Carmel High School, a fictional school in Ohio from the TV series Glee

== Carmel School ==
=== Australia ===
- Carmel School, Perth, a Jewish day school in Perth, Western Australia

=== Hong Kong ===
- Carmel Secondary School, a secondary school in Ho Man Tin

=== India ===
- Carmel Garden Matriculation Higher Secondary School, a school in Coimbatore, Tamil Nadu
- Carmel School, Giridih, a Catholic school in Giridih, Jharkhand

=== Kuwait ===
- Carmel School (Kuwait), a Catholic school in Safat
