= Carmelo =

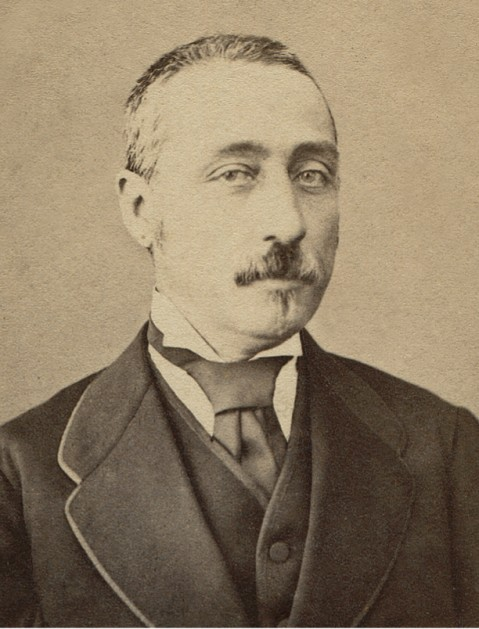
- Carmelo Sciuto-Patti
- Pronunciation: Italian: [karˈmɛːlo]
- Gender: male

Origin
- Origin: Hebrew
- Meaning: "garden"
- Region of origin: Italy, Malta, Spanish speaking countries

Other names
- Related names: Carmelita, Carmelito, Carmelina, Carmelino, Carmella, Carmela, Carmel, Carmen, Carmina, Carmine, Carmo, Carme

Carmelo is a given name. Notable people with the name include:

- Carmelo Anthony (born 1984), American basketball player
- Carmelo Antrone Lee (born 1977), Puerto Rican basketball player
- Carmelo Bene (1937–2002), Italian director, actor, philosopher, writer
- Carmelo Bentancur (born 1899), Uruguayan fencer
- Carmelo Bossi (1939–2014), Italian boxer
- Carmelo Bruzzese (born 1949), Italian mob boss
- Carmelo Cedrún (born 1930), Spanish football goalkeeper
- Carmelo Conte (born 1938), Italian lawyer and politician
- Carmelo D'Anzi (born 1956), Italian-American football coach
- Carmelo Di Bella (1921–1992), Italian football player
- Carmelo Ferraro (born 1932), Italian Roman Catholic prelate
- Carmelo Giaquinta (born 1930), Argentine bishop
- Carmelo Gómez (born 1962), Spanish actor
- Carmelo González, aka Cien Caras (born 1949), Mexican wrestler
- Carmelo González (born 1983), Spanish football midfielder
- Carmelo Lazatin Sr. (1934–2018), Filipino politician
- Carmelo Lazatin Jr. (born 1969), Filipino politician, son of Carmelo Sr., half-brother of Carmelo II
- Carmelo Lazatin II (born 1970), Filipino politician and businessman
- Carmelo Hayes (born 1994), American professional wrestler
- Carmelo Marrero (born 1981), American martial artist
- Carmelo Martínez (born 1960), Puerto Rican baseball player
- Carmelo Micciche (born 1963), French football striker
- Carmelo Miceli (1958–2025), Italian football player and manager
- Carmelo Mifsud Bonnici (born 1960), Maltese minister and Member of Parliament
- Carmelo Neto (born 2001), Brazilian politician
- Carmelo Pace (1906–1993), Maltese composer
- Carmelo Torres (1927–2003), Mexican matador and author
- Carmelo Samonà (1926–1990), Italian Hispanist and author
- Carmelo Valencia (born 1984), Colombian football player
- Carmelo Yuste Yuste (born 1984), Spanish footballer
