= Spanish ship Nuestra Señora del Carmén =

Various Spanish Navy ships

Four ships of the Spanish Navy have borne the name Nuestra Señora del Carmén, after Our Lady of Mount Carmel, the patron saint of the Spanish Navy:

- Spanish ship Nuestra Señora del Carmén (1699), a 30-gun ship of the line launched in 1699.
- Spanish ship Nuestra Señora del Carmén (1713), a 60-gun ship of the line launched in 1713.
- Spanish ship Andalucía (1730), a 62-gun ship of the line launched in 1730 and wrecked in 1740 which also carried the invocation name Nuestra Señora del Carmén.
- Nuestra Señora del Carmén, a 34-gun sailing frigate launched in 1770 and captured by the British in 1800; subsequently served in the Royal Navy as HMS Carmen.
- Spanish frigate Nuestra Señora del Carmén, a Concepción-class screw frigate in commission from 1862 to 1893, renamed Carmén in 1868.

== See also ==
- Spanish ship Carmén
- Spanish ship Nuestra Señora del Carmén y San Antonio, a 70-gun ship of the line launched in 1711.
