= Carmen (1973 Bernstein recording) =

1973 studio album by Bernstein

Studio album by Leonard Bernstein
- Released: 1973
- Recorded: September 1972
- Studio: Metropolitan Opera House
- Genre: Opera
- Language: French
- Label: Deutsche Grammophon
- Producer: Thomas Mowrey

Carmen is 1973 studio recording of Georges Bizet's complete opera Carmen, conducted by Leonard Bernstein and featuring the Metropolitan Opera Orchestra and a principal cast led by Marilyn Horne as Carmen and James McCracken as Don José. The recording was made for Deutsche Grammophon and won a Grammy Award for Best Opera recording. is notable and debated for its use of the original spoken dialogue (opéra comique style) rather than the sung recitatives that were common at the time.

== Background and production ==
The recording followed the highly successful new production of Carmen that opened the Metropolitan Opera's 1972–73 season. Bernstein was passionate about the opera and championed the use of the authentic original score, which employed spoken dialogue between musical numbers and restored music that had often been omitted in traditional performances. This approach emphasized the work's classification as an opéra comique and highlighted its raw, naturalistic drama. This approach was also based on a new critical edition of the opera by Fritz Oeser.

The New York Times noted that the production was likely the most expensively produced Carmen on disc. The recording sessions took place in September 1972 at the Manhattan Center in New York City. The production team aimed to use early quadraphonic (four-channel) recording technology to create an immersive, theatrical sound experience for home listeners. The recording featured the Metropolitan Opera Orchestra, but the Manhattan Opera Chorus was used instead of the Met's own chorus due to union disputes.

== Cast ==
The principal cast was largely the same as the critically acclaimed stage production at the Met:

- Carmen: Marilyn Horne (Mezzo-soprano)
- Don José: James McCracken (Tenor)
- Escamillo: Tom Krause (Baritone)
- Micaëla: Adriana Maliponte (Soprano)
- Zuniga: Donald Gramm (Bass)
- Moralès: Raymond Gibbs (Baritone)
- Frasquita: Colette Boky (Soprano)
- Mercédès: Marcia Baldwin (Mezzo-soprano)

== Reception and awards ==
Critical response to the recording was mixed, with reviewers differing sharply in their assessments of Bernstein's musical choices. One reviewer for The New York Times described the recording as the most provocative version of Carmen, noting that it departed from routine interpretations and was deeply infused with Bernstein's personality. The reviewer observed that “Bernstein, it seems to me, has constantly sought for this paradoxical ideal and here he achieves it with glorious results.” Bernstein employed slower tempos, which some criticized and others considered "revelatory." Another New York Times reviewer offered a more critical assessment, arguing that the decision to use the dialogue version did not encourage elegance or intimacy. Instead, the performance was characterized as “a big, brassy, symphonic reading, impressive as such but a bit blustering.” A reviewer for Gramophone magazine was more sharply critical, describing the recording as an “unedifying experience” and noting that the singers were often subordinated to the orchestra and the conductor's performance.

Upon release, the recording was an immediate commercial success, selling over 100,000 copies.

Though controversial for its unconventional approach, the recording has been rereleased by DG and New York Times critics included the recording as one of Bernstein's best recordings. It went on to win the Grammy Award for Best Opera Recording in 1973.
