= Carmine Gentile (painter) =

Italian painter and potter

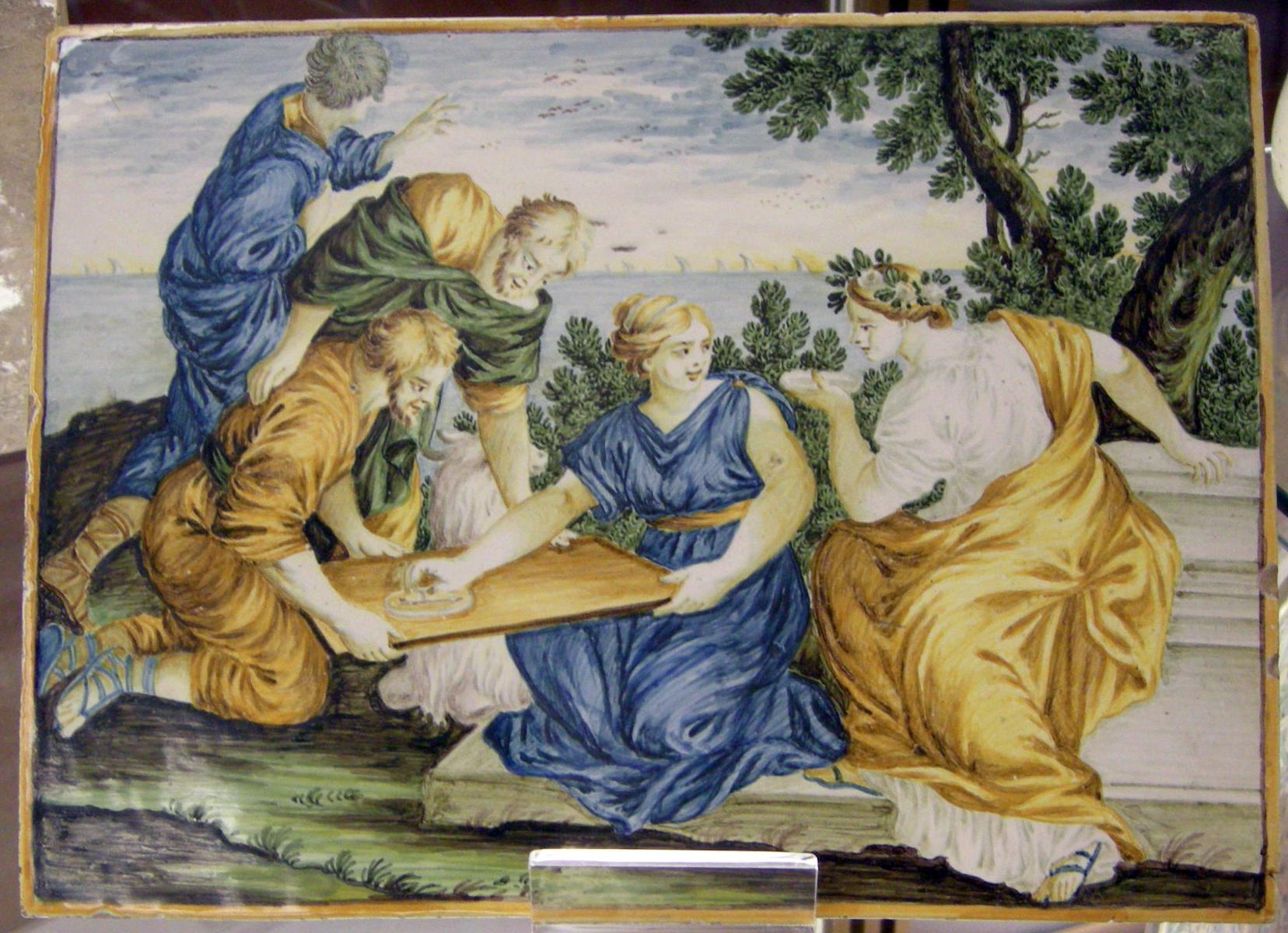
Maiolica Castelli, Carmine Gentili, Allegory of Accademia degli illuminati, XVIII sec.

Carmine Gentile (16 July 1678 - 11 July 1763) was an Italian painter and potter of maiolica in Castelli, Abruzzo, Kingdom of Naples. He trained with Carlo Antonio Grue, the son of Francesco Grue. His sons Giacomo il Giovane (born 1717) and Berardino (1727-1813) were also maiolica painters. Giacomo il Vecchio lived 1768-1813.
