= Carmen Olarte =

Venezuelan voice actress

Carmen Olarte is a retired Venezuelan voice actress who was the voice of Amelia Wil Tesla Seyruun in Slayers and Meloso in Almendrita in the Latin American version of these anime's. She lives in Washington, D.C.

== Filmography ==
=== Anime ===
- Amelia - Slayers
- Kathy - Goal FH
- Meloso - Almendrita

=== Animation ===
- Fifi - Tiny Toons
- Pimientosa - Histeria!
- Jake - Tazmania
- Meg - Mega Babies
- Super Girl - New Adventures of Superman
- Jay Jay - Jay Jay the Jet Plane
