= Carmine Quartet =

Hungarian string quartet

The Carmine String Quartet (Carmine Vonósnégyes) was a string quartet founded by Varga Veronika, joined by another three Hungarian women. After one personnel change the members of the Quartet are

- Véber Judit (first violin)
- Varga Veronika (second violin)
- Kis Veronika (viola)
- Czékmány Szilvia (cello)
