= Carmen Ennesch =

Luxembourgish-French journalist, writer, and historian

Carmen Ennesch (22 May 1902 – 19 February 2000) was a Luxembourgish-French journalist, writer, and historian. She is known as the first female Luxembourgish journalist.

== Early life and education ==
Carmen Ennesch was born on 22 May 1902 in Aachen, Germany, the daughter of the engineer and writer Alphonse Ennesch. After completing her baccalauréat at the Lycée de Jeunes Filles in Luxembourg in 1921, she studied law and economics in Austria, Belgium and Germany before obtaining a degree in social and political science from the University of Frankfurt-am-Main in 1923. Her thesis focussed on the wage structures of metallurgical workers and miners. After marrying Pierre Paul Desmulie she became a French citizen and moved to Paris in 1939, but refused to comply with contemporary social traditions and give up working once married.

== Career ==
At the end of the 1920s, Ennesch began working as a journalist. She was a correspondent for the Journal d'Esch and Tageblatt, from 1932 to 1990, and from 1934 worked as a correspondent for the Toulouse daily newspaper La Dépêche du Midi. Her articles covered political, historical, and feminist topics, and appeared in many Parisian newspapers, but also in periodicals such as Saarbrücker Zeitung, Cahiers d’études cathares, Die Luxemburgerin, L’Action féminine, Luxembourg, Journal des professeurs, Les Cahiers luxembourgeois, the radical paper L'Ere nouvelle, and the Belgian socialist newspaper Le Peuple. She also presented shows on RTL Radio Lëtzebuerg and France Culture.

As a writer and journalist, Ennesch focused on feminism, socialism, the Cathars, and political and social engagement. She also authored biographies of Rosa Luxemburg and Vittoria Colonna. Her biography of Odette de Champdivers appeared in serial form in Femmes d’aujourd’hui in 1933 and 1934. In the studies La Personnalité de la femme dans la conception socialiste (1932), and Aux sources du féminisme (1934), Ennesch analysed the feminist movement and its history.

Her first book, Au-dessus du ressentiment franco-allemand (1932) was written in favour of a Franco-German alliance with a view to a socially unified Europe, and found its origins in the friendship between Ennesch and Andrée Viénot-Mayrisch, a militant socialist. Émigrations politiques d’hier et d’aujourd’hui (1946) looked at different political emigrations over time. Mosaïque bulgare was not only a travelogue but also an economic analysis and philosophical study of the Bogomil faith.

Given her regular stays in Toulouse, where the Christian, Arab, Jewish, Iberian, and Occitan cultures and religions had peacefully cohabited in the 12th century, Ennesch was particularly interested in the philosophy, life and history of the Cathars. The results of her research were published in L’Épopée albigeoise (1961) and in Les Cathares dans la cité (1969). The two books were united in the collection De l’épopée albigeoise aux Cathares parmi nous (1985).

Ennesch's legacy as a researcher, writer, and pioneer of female journalism was honoured with an exhibition at the Luxembourg National Archives on the 100th anniversary of her birth in 2002, Carmen Ennesch: la présentation d’un legs: le fonds Carmen Ennesch FD 111. The National Archives in Luxembourg not only preserve the archives of Carmen Ennesch, but also her library. Ennesch was also a member of SELF / S.E.L.F. - Société des écrivains luxembourgeois de langue française.

== Works ==
- Au-dessus du ressentiment franco-allemand, 1932
- La Vie et la Mort de Rosa Luxembourg, 1935
- Émigrations politiques d’hier et d’aujourd’hui, 1946
- La Vie comblée de Vittoria Colonna. La grande inspiratrice. L'unique amour de Michel-Ange, 1947
- L’Épopée albigeoise, 1961
- Les Cathares dans la cité, 1969
- Mosaïque bulgare. Impressions d'un pays socialiste, 1970
- De l’épopée albigeoise aux Cathares parmi nous, 1985
