= Karmel (name) =

Karmel (/ˈkar.mɛl/) is a surname and a masculine given name. It is reported as one of the surnames used by the Jews in Ireland. In the Dictionary of American Family Names (2003) it is described as a surname of the Jews from Poland. The same publication cites its origin as the Polish work karmel (Polish: caramel). Notable people with the name include:

== Surname ==
- Alex Karmel (1931–2015), American writer
- Annabel Karmel (born 1957), British writer
- Ian Karmel (born 1984), American stand-up comedian and writer
- Miriam Karmel, American writer
- Peter Karmel (1922–2008), Australian economist
- Pip Karmel (born 1963), Australian filmmaker
- Roberta Karmel (born 1937), American lawyer and legal scholar

== Given name ==
- Karmel Kandreva (1931–1982), Arbëresh writer and poet
