= Carmen Pata =

American weightlifter

- Born: Oshkosh, Wisconsin, U.S.
- Occupation: Competitive Weightlifter
- Years active: 2001-Present

Carmen Pata is a professional weightlifter, having competed in Olympic-style weightlifting, or Olympic weightlifting and Strongman since 2001. Carmen Pata has won numerous awards in Strongman competitions, Pan American Games, World Masters Games, and the U.S. National Meet, including a 1st-place finish at the 2013 PanAm Games in Chicago, a 1st-place finish at the U.S. National meet in 2012 in Savannah, Georgia, and was recognized as Minnesota's Strongest Man in 2010. Carmen Pata is still highly competitive in the +105 kg weight class.

== Background ==
Carmen Pata grew up in Oshkosh, Wisconsin, being a three sport athlete of soccer, basketball, and track until his junior year, when he was introduced to football. From there, Carmen Pata excelled in the sport of football due to his intelligence and his willingness to work to become the best. Pata first came to UWRF from Oshkosh and played football for the Falcons from 1996-99. He started his football career at UWRF as a defensive lineman, but moved to the offensive line later. The Oshkosh Lourdes High School graduate was named to the first All-WIAC team after his senior season at UWRF.

When Pata first came to River Falls he wanted to be a professional football player. But in 1998, while still a student, then football defensive coordinator and strength coach Tom Journell, gave Pata a chance to work in the athletic performance arena. Pata first helped with the Falcon softball and men's basketball teams. In 2001 he had a dual role as an athletic performance coach and assistant football coach. In 2006 he became UWRF's full-time athletic performance coach. Pata has loved coaching ever since, as he is able to help young adults achieve dreams they never thought they could and it allows him to continue his ancestry of engineers, which is an interesting statement, since his schooling and profession have nothing to do with engineering.

== Competition ==
=== Competition guidelines ===
The sport is controlled by the International Weightlifting Federation (IWF). Based in Budapest, it was founded in 1905. The two competition lifts required in Olympic-style weightlifting are: the snatch and the clean and jerk. Each weightlifter receives three attempts in each, and the combined total of the highest two successful lifts determines the overall result within a bodyweight category. Bodyweight categories are different for women and men. A lifter who fails to complete at least one successful snatch and one successful clean and jerk also fails to total, and therefore receives an "incomplete" entry for the competition. The clean and press was once a competition lift, but was discontinued due to difficulties in judging proper form.

=== Weightlifting career ===
Pata began his competitive weightlifting after his playing years for the UW- River Falls football team. He began in the spring of 2001 as a way to stay in shape and continue to be competitive at a high level. He started training for the Strongman competitions, while still coaching for the UWRF football staff. He began with small regional competitions throughout the state of Minnesota, winning multiple top 3 regional finishes, until he finally broke through the ranks and won the coveted award of Minnesota's Strongest Man in 2010. From there, Carmen Pata's name erupted onto the national and international weightlifting scene, as he won the U.S. National meet in Savannah, Georgia, in March 2012. Pata won with a total weight of 572 pounds (242 in the Snatch and lift and 330 in the Clean and Jerk) to qualify him for the Pan American Games in Chicago, Illinois that summer. From the U.S. National meet, Carmen Pata went on to the Pan American Games in Chicago in 2013 and won the entire event at the +105 kg weight class with a total weight of 643 pounds (286 pounds in the snatch and lift and 357 pounds in the clean and jerk).

Pata has experienced major success in Olympic Weightlifting for how relatively new he is to the sport and he attributes it to his years of Strongman and his willingness to learn and grow. Pata's tear through the ranks continued for the next couple of years, as he has notched a 3rd-place finish at the 2014 Pan American games in the Dominican Republic, a 2nd-place finish at the 2013 U.S. National Meet in New Jersey, a 3rd-place finish at the 2014 Masters World Games in Italy.

== Coaching and mentoring ==
=== Coaching career ===
Carmen Pata was the head Strength and Conditioning coach at the University of Wisconsin-River Falls from 2006 to 2023 after five years as an assistant football coach and strength coach. Pata loved coaching ever since, as he was able to help young adults achieve dreams they never thought they could, and it allows him to continue his ancestry of engineers, as he was now a 5th generation engineer.

=== Notable athletes coached ===
- Owen Schmitt (NFL)
- Richard Melzer (NBA)
- Joel Yogerst (Arena Football)
- Ollie White and Ben Gressmer (Portugal Basketball League)
- Jordan Crockett (2015 200m Outdoor National Champion)
- 10 NSCA All-Americans

=== Former staff members ===
- Kevin Schmalzried (St. Louis Cardinals Organization)
- Wayne Tuckson (Syracuse University)
- Andy King (San Francisco Giants organization)
- David Kapping (University of Minnesota)
- Beau DeBruin (Owner of Big Impact Fitness)
- Jason Laube (Owner of Cutting Edge Fitness)
