= Carmel, West Virginia =

Unincorporated community in West Virginia, United States

- Unincorporated community
- Location within West Virginia Location within the United States
- Coordinates: 39°19′50″N 79°16′41″W
- Country: United States
- State: West Virginia
- County: Preston
- Elevation: 2,602 ft (793 m)
- Time zone: UTC-5 (Eastern (EST))
  - Summer (DST): UTC-4 (EDT)
- Area codes: 304 & 681
- GNIS feature ID: 1556730

Carmel is an unincorporated community in Preston County, in the U.S. state of West Virginia.

== History ==
A post office called Carmel was established in 1880, and remained in operation until 1912. The community most likely takes its name from Mount Carmel in Western Asia.
