= Ciaramella =

Ciaramella is an Italian surname. Notable people with the surname include:

- Alberto Ciaramella (born 1947), Italian computer engineer and scientist
- Massimo Ciaramella (born 1970), Italian baseball player

== See also ==
- Caramella (disambiguation), includes a list of people with the surname Caramella
