= Carmel School (Kuwait) =

Carmel School Kuwait (CSK)

Location
- (Kuwait) Safat; Kuwait
- Coordinates: 29°16′42″N 47°58′28″E

Information
- Type: Private
- Motto: EXCELSIOR
- Established: 1969; 57 years ago
- Principal: Sr. Saritha Monteiro A.C
- Grades: LKG-12
- Gender: Co-educational
- Language: English
- Sports: Football, Volleyball, Basketball, Chess, Table Tennis, Badminton
- Website: Carmel School Kuwait and Student Profile

Carmel School, Kuwait is a private Catholic school of all religious denominations in Kuwait. The school was established in 1969 by the Sisters of the Apostolic Carmel, who have several educational establishments across the Middle East, Africa and Asia. The school was first established in Salwa and later shifted to Khaitan. It is managed by the nuns of the Apostolic Carmel.

== Certificates ==
The school is recognized by the Ministry of Education, Kuwait and affiliated to the National Council of Educational Research and Training, New Delhi.

== Language ==
Lessons are conducted in English; Hindi is the compulsory second language till the fourth grade, after which French is offered as an option. Arabic is taught as a third language to 1st graders till the 8th grade.
