= Carmel Chapel, Penrhiwceiber =

Chapel in Rhondda Cynon Taf, Wales

Coordinates: 51.6710°N 3.3643°W

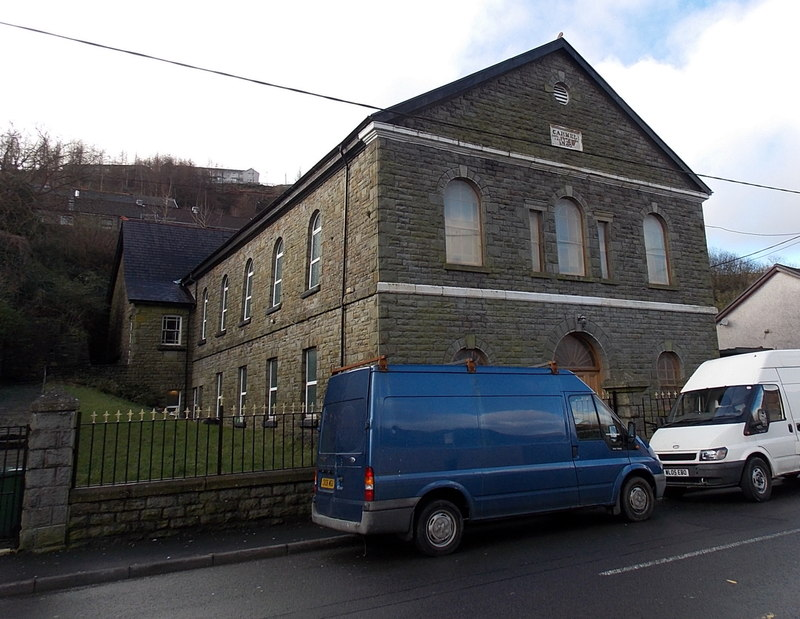
Carmel chapel in Penrhiwceiber

Carmel, Penrhiwceiber is an Independent chapel in Penrhiwceiber, Glamorgan, Wales. Services at Carmel were conducted in the Welsh language.

== Early history ==
The history of the church can be traced to the 1870s when prayer meetings and Sunday Schools were held in various chapels locally. Plans to open the first chapel were agreed on 12 November 1880 and the chapel was built over a matter of months and opened on 9 July 1881.

Robert Thomas, a native of Ffestiniog, was minister from 1882 until 1905, when he died aged 52. Thomas was active in public life and spent twelve years as a member of the Pontypridd Board of Guardians.

The chapel has suffered from subsidence caused by mining subsistence. This was later rectified by the National Coal Board. The chapel remains open.

== Bibliography ==
- Jones, Alan Vernon (2004). Chapels of the Cynon Valley. Cynon Valley Historical Society. ISBN 0953107612.
