= Carmel: Who Killed Maria Marta? =

2020 Argentine documentary miniseries

- Spanish: Carmel ¿quién mató a María Marta?
- Genre: True crime Documentary
- Written by: Alejandro Hartmann; Sofía Mora; Lucas Bucci; Tomás Sposato
- Directed by: Alejandro Hartmann
- Country of origin: Argentina
- Original language: Spanish
- No. of seasons: 1
- No. of episodes: 4

Production
- Executive producers: Mariela Besuievsky; Vanessa Ragone
- Running time: 55–60 minutes
- Production company: Haddock Films

Original release
- Release: November 5, 2020

Carmel: Who Killed María Marta? is a 2020 Argentine true crime documentary miniseries directed by Alejandro Hartmann.

It was written by Alejandro Hartmann, Sofía Mora (who was in charge of the investigation), Lucas Bucci and Tomás Sposato. The showrunner and producer was Vanessa Ragone.

The miniseries tells the story of the 2002 still-unsolved death of María Marta García Belsunce and the controversial criminal case that followed, known as the García Belsunce Case, which received large media coverage. Each one of the four episodes focuses on an aspect of the investigation, exploring different investigation lines and suspects, including interviews with journalists who covered the crime, the prosecutor of the criminal case, family members and friends.

The series was filmed at the Carmel Country Club, the gated community in Pilar, Buenos Aires, where the crime took place, as well as Bariloche and Buenos Aires. It premiered worldwide on Netflix on November 5, 2020.

== Subject matter ==
María Marta García Belsunce (born April 24, 1952) was an upper-class Argentine sociologist, daughter of Adolfo García Belsunce (a well-known jurist) and Luz María Blanca Luisa Galup. She devoted her last days to social causes, working with NGOs such as Red Social and becoming the vice-president for Missing Children Argentina.

On October 27, 2002, María Marta García Belsunce was found dead in her house, part of the Carmel Country Club, an upper-class gated community in Pilar, Buenos Aires. This led to what was known as the García Belsunce Case. During the first days of the investigation, it was believed to be an accidental death caused by a fall in the bathtub. But a month and a half later, as new forensic reports were ordered, it was found that María Marta had been killed by five shots to the head.

Some of the lines of investigation included a link with the Juárez Cartel, a failed robbery, and a fight García Belsunce had with her husband.

Her widower, Carlos Carrascosa, was prosecuted and jailed for five years on homicide charges. The victim's brother, Horacio García Belsunce, and her half-brother, John Hurtig, were also prosecuted on cover-up charges, but were later acquitted. Overall, two trials were held, with thirteen people prosecuted. A new trial will be held to prosecute Nicolás Pachelo, the victim's neighbor.

== Persons featured ==
The series chronicles the case mainly through interviews with Rolando Barbano and Pablo Duggan, journalists who covered the case. These are supported by interviews with family members and friends involved in the case who give their perspectives on it, as well as the case prosecutor Diego Molina Pico. The miniseries also feature writers Guillermo Martínez and Claudia Piñeiro, who analyze the social impact of the case.

=== Journalists ===
- Rolando Barbano
- Pablo Duggan

=== Victim ===
- María Marta García Belsunce (archive images)

=== Family members ===
- Carlos Carrascosa (widower)
- Horacio García Belsunce (brother)
- Irene Hurtig (half-sibling)
- John Hurtig (half-brother)
- Guillermo Bártoli (brother-in-law)

=== Lawyers ===
- Diego Molina Pico (prosecutor)
- Diego Ferrari (Carlos Carrascosa's lawyer)
- Gabriel Becker (Gauvry Gordon's lawyer)

=== Other trial witnesses ===
- Nicolás Pachelo (Carmel Country Club neighbor, accused of murdering the victim)
- Juan Ramón Gauvry Gordon (first paramedic to be at the crime scene)
- Santiago Biasi (second paramedic to be at the crime scene)
- Sergio Binello (Carmel Country Club neighbor)
- Beatriz Michelini (masseur who used to attend the victim)

== Episodes ==
| No. | Title | Directed by | Original release date |
|---|---|---|---|
| 1 | "Un domingo lluvioso" "A Rainy Sunday" | Alejandro Hartmann | November 5, 2020 |
| 2 | "Cinco balas y un pituto" "Five Bullets and a "Thingy"" | Alejandro Hartmann | November 5, 2020 |
| 3 | "El juicio" "The Trial" | Alejandro Hartmann | November 5, 2020 |
| 4 | "Contar una historia" "To Tell a Story" | Alejandro Hartmann | November 5, 2020 |
