= Carmelita Torres =

Mexican human rights activist

Carmelita Torres was a "red-haired Mexican woman" known for starting the 1917 Bath riots on the Mexico–United States border between Ciudad Juárez, Chihuahua, and El Paso, Texas. At the time of the riots, she was 17 years old and working as a maid in the United States.

== 1917 Bath riot ==
=== Background ===
A new policy from the U.S. required all workers to be bathed in a kerosene mixture to kill lice that may have been carrying typhus due to an outbreak in a few major Mexican cities, including Ciudad Juárez. In addition, all workers were stripped and inspected and their clothes were steam dried. Tensions were high due to the fact that several Mexican prisoners in El Paso had recently been burned to death while being covered in gasoline and because the US health personnel running the inspections were found to have been secretly photographing the women they had stripped and posting the photos in local bars.

=== Riot ===
On January 28 at 7:30 a.m., Torres resisted the process and refused to go through it. She was asked to get out of her trolley and to begin the process. Instead, she convinced 30 other Mexican women to get out and protest with her. When others saw their resistance they joined in by protesting as well. Within an hour, there were more than 200 women blocking the entrance to El Paso. By the end of the demonstration, there were several thousand protesters. Once the officers tried to break up the crowd, the demonstrators threw rocks at them. They laid in front of trains and vehicles. When police aimed their guns into the crowd, they responded by yelling louder. The police were unable to break them up and she was arrested. After her arrest, she went missing. Until this day, it is not known what happened to her.

== Legacy ==
A migrant home across the Stanton Street Bridge in El Paso, called Casa Carmelita, is being named after her. Sergio Troncoso wrote a short story, "Carmelita Torres," in A Peculiar Kind of Immigrant's Son (Cinco Puntos Press), his collection of linked short stories on immigration, which describes what might have happened to her and why she should remain important to scholars and readers long after her death.
