= Carmel Valley =

Carmel Valley can refer to several places:

- Carmel Valley, California, an unincorporated community in Monterey County, California
- Carmel Valley Village, California, an unincorporated community in Monterey County, California
- Carmel Valley AVA, an American Viticultural Area in Monterey County, California
- the valley of the Carmel River, in Monterey County, California
- Carmel Valley, San Diego, a suburban planned community in the city of San Diego, in San Diego, California
