= Nancy Carman =

American ceramist (born 1950)

Nancy Carman (born 1950) is an American ceramist.

Born in Tucson, Carman has also been active in San Francisco during her career. She earned her bachelor's degree from the University of California, Davis in 1972, following with a master of fine arts degree from the University of Washington in 1976; she also studied at the San Francisco Art Institute. Her work, largely figural in nature, is generally autobiographical. She received an Individual Craftsman's Grant from the National Endowment for the Arts in 1979, and is represented in the collection of the Renwick Gallery of the Smithsonian American Art Museum.
