= Carmine (disambiguation) =

Carmine is a pigment of a bright-red color.

Carmine may also refer to:

- Carmine (color), deep red colors
- Carmine (given name)
- Carmine (surname)
- Carmine, Texas
- Carmine Church, Carrara, Italy
- Carmine Lake, a livery of LMS
- Carmine Quartet, the chamber music group
- Indigo carmine, a salt of indigo
- Northern carmine bee-eater
- Southern carmine bee-eater

== See also ==
- Carmin (disambiguation)
