= Carme, Spain =

Carme
- Municipality
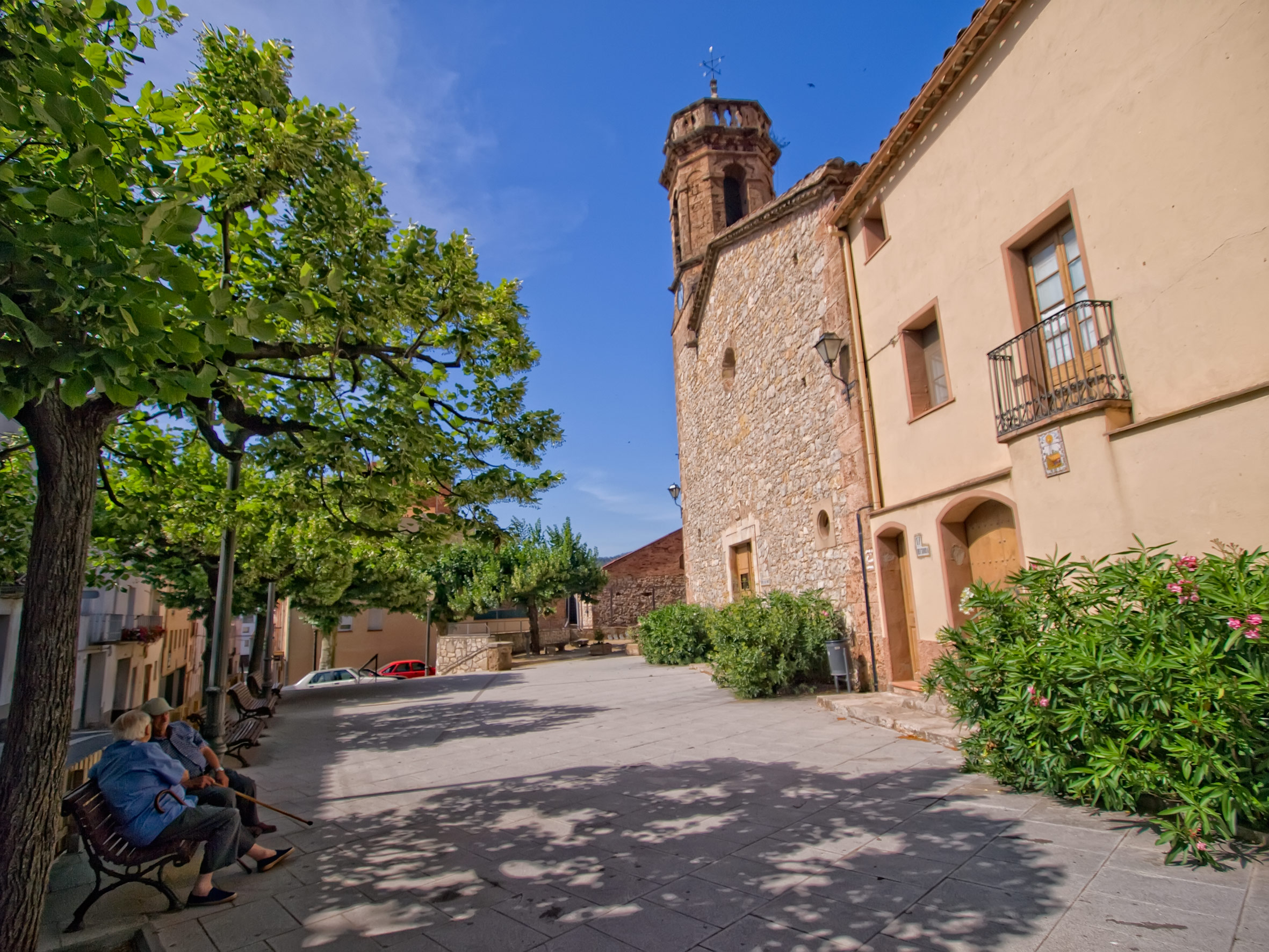
- Sant Martí church square

- Coat of arms

- Location in Catalonia Carme (Spain)
- Coordinates: 41°32′0″N 1°37′18″E
- Country: Spain
- Community: Catalonia
- Province: Barcelona
- Comarca: Anoia

Government
  - Mayor: Jordi Sellarès Poch (2015)

Area
  - Total: 11.7 km^{2} (4.5 sq mi)

Population (2025-01-01)
  - Total: 847
  - Density: 72.4/km^{2} (187/sq mi)
- Website: www.carme.cat

Carme (Catalan pronunciation: [ˈkaɾmə]) is a municipality in the comarca of the Anoia in Catalonia, Spain. The town is in the middle of a valley, which is surrounded by the Orpinell range (751 m.) and the other by the Collbàs range (544 m.). The village is at the bottom of the valley and is surrounded by forests. The capital of the region of Anoia, Igualada, is just ten kilometers from the village, while other municipalities like La Pobla de Claramunt or Capellades are about five kilometers from the village. Currently the village has approximately 800 inhabitants, but in holiday seasons this figure may be slightly increased.

== History ==
It is believed the town was founded at the end of the Middle Ages, although the first historical documents of the town speak of the late seventeenth century. At the time of the Arab conquest and during the same average age (10th and 11 centuries), much of Cataloniawas partially occupied by Arabs. This caused the middle of the country to form a series of fortifications in order to monitor the progress of Arabs to Europe today. This set of fortifications are known as the border castles and correspond to a fictitious line drawn through the current central Catalonia allowing visually dominate a vast territory and defend it quickly and efficiently. Some castles then be visited on route "border castles of the Middle Ages" along the Catalan territory. The Anoia region is one of the most preserved castles and small fortresses, and allows for a very similar to the reality of that time. One of the best preserved and restored castles is the La Pobla de Claramunt, located five kilometers from the town of Carme.

At the beginning of the 18th century, Carme underwent a major demographic and economic growth and during that growth, a new religious temple was built. Currently, this is the village church, where they celebrate the traditional local and national festivals of the village, along with religious activities.

== Climate ==
Carme's climate is due to its location and topography. It has many hot summers (25–40 °C) and very cold winters in extremely cold. Half of the rainfall is concentrated in the autumn but also in spring it rains frequently. In winter snow thickness episodes live media, so despite not having much altitude valley was cold and the accumulated snow level down in this area compared to other towns like La Laguna.

== See also ==
- Riera de Carme - a local river
