= Spanish ship Carmén =

Various Spanish Navy ships

Two ships of the Spanish Navy have borne the name Carmén, after Mount Carmel:

- Spanish ship Carmén (1730), a 64-gun ship of the line launched in 1730 and scrapped in 1764.
- Spanish frigate Nuestra Señora del Carmén, a Concepción-class screw frigate in commission from 1862 to 1893, renamed Carmén in 1868.

== See also ==
- Spanish ship Nuestra Señora del Carmén
