= Carmella Flöck =

Austrian resistance member (1898–1982)

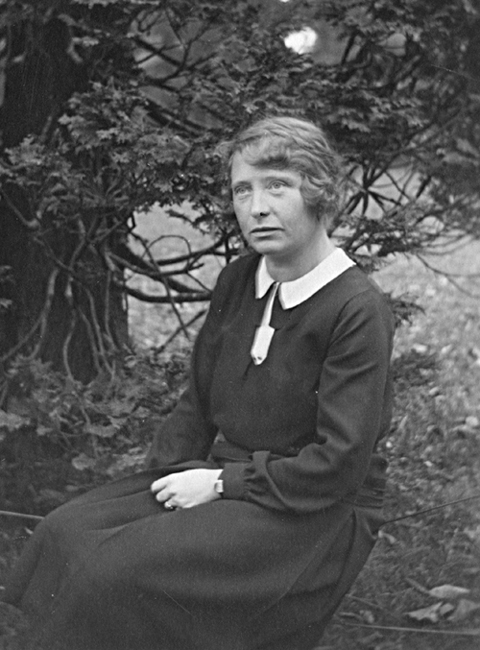
Carmella Flöck in the 1920s

Carmella Flöck (28 October 1898 – 20 December 1982) was a courier for the Austrian Resistance during the Anschluss of 1938-1945. She was a survivor of the Ravensbrück concentration camp.

== Life ==
Carmella Flöck was born in Innsbruck as an extramarital child, the daughter of a tailor, Juliane Flöck, in Innsbruck. After being at an elementary school (Mädchenbürgerschule) and a trade school (Ursulinen) in Innsbruck, she worked from 1915 to 1923 at a bank. After a downsizing of the bank, she lost her job and was then doing temporary jobs. During this time her mother adopted another girl as a foster child. Flöck grew into the role of being her sister's mother as she was 24 years younger than her. In 1925, Flöck became an office worker at the National Association of Catholic Workers of Tyrol. This Christian workers association was modeled after Pope Leo XIII's Enzyklika Rerum Novarum. Flöck worked lastly in a leading position at the office until it was taken over by the national socialists on 11 March 1938, who then dissolved it. Flöck began secretarial work in 1938 for the architect Franz Baumann. She remained critical towards the national Socialist regime and was therefore recruited by an acquaintance into a resistance movement. She recruited new members for this resistance group and was working as a courier. The group was betrayed and she was arrested on 10 October 1942. After several months in Innsbruck prison, she was taken to the Ravensbrück concentration camp on 20 February 1943. Her inmate number was 17046. Flöck survived the concentration camp despite a typhus infection. After the liberation, she returned to Innsbruck and worked at the organization for victims of the national socialist regime in Tyrol and from 1949 as secretary to the state politician Hans Gamper.

== Awards ==
Flöck received the Ehrenzeichen des Landes Tirol (1958) as well as the Ehrenzeichens für Verdienste um die Befreiung Österreichs (1977).

== Work ==
After her retirement in 1961, Flöck recorded her memories between 1965 and 1970. She kept the manuscript to herself until her death. In 2012 her manuscript was first published in the form of a book.
