= Katharine W. Carman =

American geologist

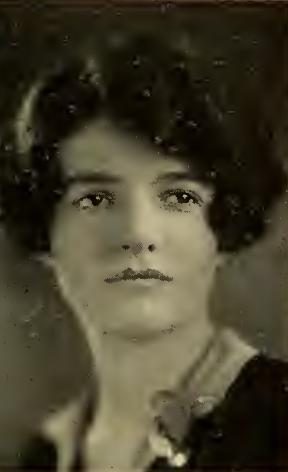
- Katharine Woodley Carman, from the 1927 yearbook of Wellesley College
- Born: Katharine Woodley Carman; 1906; New York City
- Died: 2008 (aged 102)
- Occupation: Geologist

Katharine Woodley Carman (1906 – 2008) was an American petroleum geologist. In a 1938 profile, she was described as "the only woman geologist in the United States employed by an oil company to work in the field exploring for oil".

== Early life and education ==
Carman was born in New York City, and raised in Colorado and in Evanston, Illinois, the daughter of George Washington Carman and Ruth Anne (Woodley) Carman. Her father was president of an investment brokerage; her mother was a Northwestern University graduate. She graduated from Evanston High School in 1923 and from Wellesley College in 1927. She completed a PhD at the Massachusetts Institute of Technology in 1933, with a dissertation titled "The Shallow-Water Foraminifera of Bermuda."

== Career ==
Carman was a micropaleontologist in the petroleum industry. She was an analyst for the Petroleum Administration Board from 1934 to 1936, and was based in Texas and Nebraska as a geologist for the Felmont Corporation from 1936 to 1939. She was exploration manager for North Central Oil Corporation from 1939 to 1941. In 1943, she returned to the Petroleum Administration for wartime planning and economic analysis. Her expertise was cited and her testimony was read into the record of several Congressional committees, including a 1942 Senate hearing on mineral resources and public lands.

Carman was the Illinois district geologist for the Great Lakes Carbon Corporation from 1943 to 1946. Beginning in 1946, she was a partner in the Buckhorn Oil Company, based in Indiana. She lived in Colorado in the 1950s.

== Publications ==
- "Some Foraminifera from the Niobrara and Benton formations of Wyoming" (1929)
