= Karmen McNamara =

Canadian triathlete

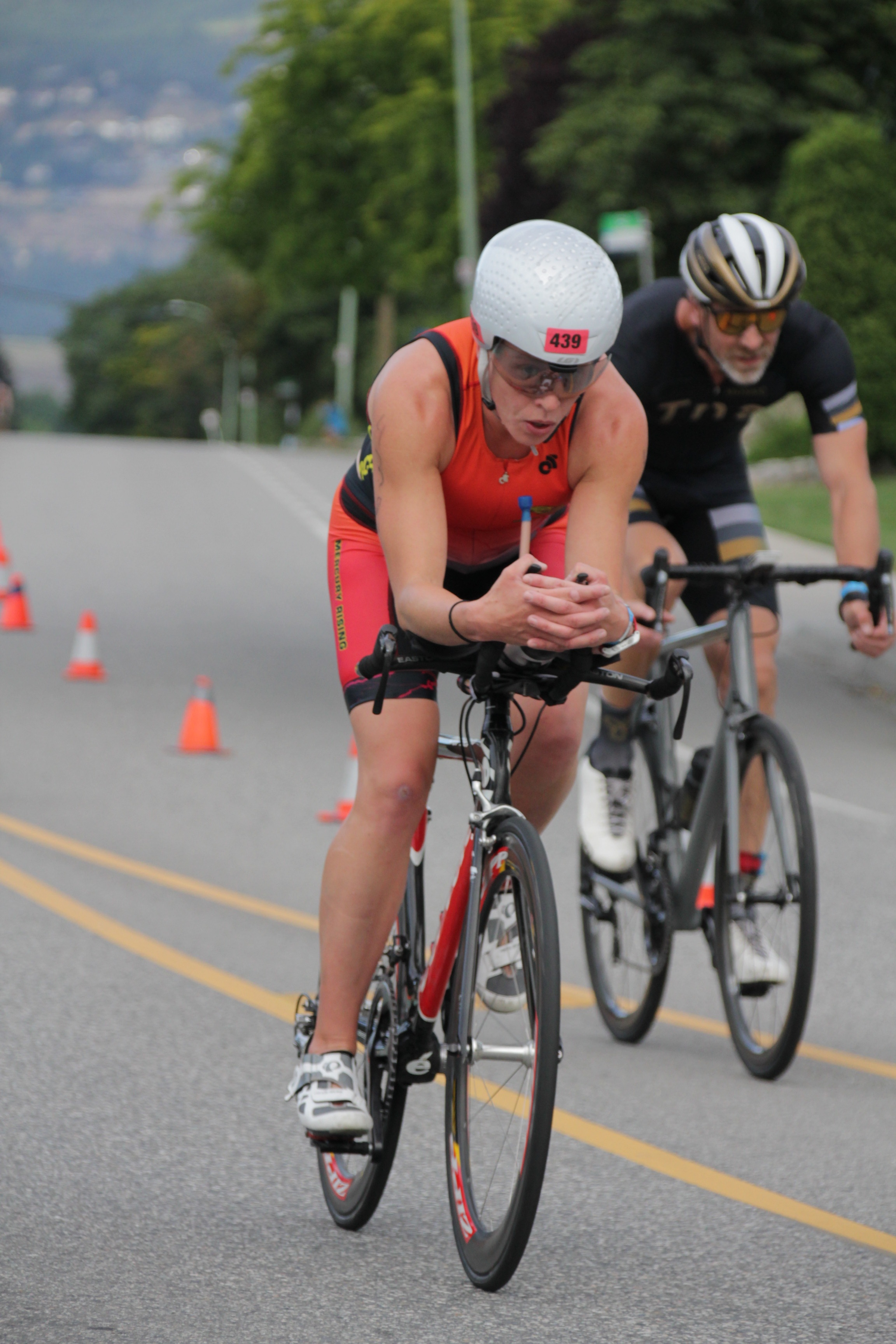
- McNamara at the Canadian National Championships in July 2019

Personal information
- Nationality: Canadian
- Born: October 12, 1983 (age 42) Red Deer, Alberta
- Occupation: Triathlete
- Height: 157.5 cm (5 ft 2.0 in)
- Weight: 130 lb (59 kg)
- Life partner: Robert James (Jim) Rabb
- Other interests: Advocacy for persons with disabilities and mental illness.
- Website: http://www.karmenmcnamara.com/

Sport
- Sport: Triathlon

Karmen McNamara (born October 12, 1983) is a retired Canadian triathlete. She was previously CEO of The Kindness Factory. McNamara is the founder and General Manager of Help Ukraine Vancouver Island Society, a non-profit organization that supports Ukrainian refugees on Vancouver Island, in Canada. She is also known for her advocacy work with people with disabilities.

McNamara is a recipient of the 2025 Honorary Citizen award from the City of Victoria.

She was named as one of Vancouver Island's most Inspiring Women for her work in theatre, with Help Ukraine Vancouver Island, and as a Para-lympic guide.

== Help Ukraine Vancouver Island Society (2022-present) ==
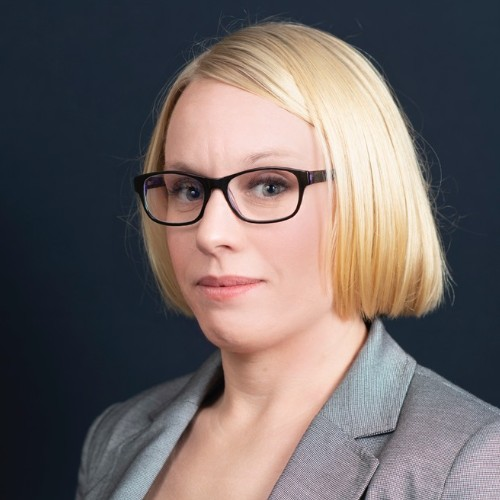

McNamara's work to support Ukrainian refugees on Vancouver Island began in March 2022 in response to a sense of paralysis from other, more established, organizations. Under her leadership, the organization quickly grew to be known as the leading agency for assisting Ukrainians on Vancouver Island, and a model for other agencies to follow.

The non-profit organization has assisted over 1500 Ukrainian refugees as of january 2024. HUVI's work includes providing weekly groceries to over 200 families through their 7 weekly Food Share events, running a hosting program, housing-match program, peer support program, as well as providing welcome baskets to every new Ukrainian family, and offering online English classes for all levels. Help Ukraine Vancouver Island Society also ran a children's day camp "Camp Sunflower" for 9 weeks in the summer of 2023.

== Theatre (1992-Present) ==
McNamara began acting at the age of 9, and has been involved in theatre as an actor, director, designer, and stage manager throughout Western Canada.

McNamara received a diploma in acting from Red Deer College, and a Bachelor of Arts in Drama from the University of Saskatchewan.

In Calgary, she co-founded Liquid Meld Theatre, where she directed several shows, including a touring production of ‘’Zanna Don't’'.

In January 2024, McNamara co-directed the world premiere of the play "A Dictionary of Emotions in Wartime" with Ukrainian director Diana Budiachenko. She was featured as one of Vancouver Island's most inspiring women. The show was re-mounted in November 2025 at the STAND festival in Vancouver.

Upcoming:

“White Christmas: The Musical” (VOS) at McPherson Playhouse November 28-December 7, 2025.

“Jack and the Beanstalk: The Panto” (St. Luke’s Players) at St. Luke’s Hall December 12, 2025 – January 1, 2026.

== The Kindness Factory (2020-2022) ==
In March 2020, McNamara founded a non-medical mask shop called The Kindness Factory. She was employed as its CEO. The Kindness Factory closed in September 2021 due to the lack of need for non-medical masks.

== Crystal Pool (2018-2025) ==
McNamara is known for her advocacy work surrounding access to recreation for people with disabilities and mental illness through the Victoria Cool Aid Society.

In 2018, she penned an open letter to Victoria City Council in support of access to a barrier-free recreation facility known as Crystal Pool and Fitness Centre. She addressed Council on November 22, 2018, and published a follow-up letter on July 2, 2019.

McNamara was the spokesperson for the Let's Get Crystal Clean campaign that saw the residents of Victoria vote in 2025 in favour of replacing the pool.

== Triathlon ==
McNamara won the 2019 Canadian National Championships in Kelowna, British Columbia for Standard Distance triathlon.

McNamara raced for Team Canada at the International Triathlon Union World Championships in 2014 and 2015.

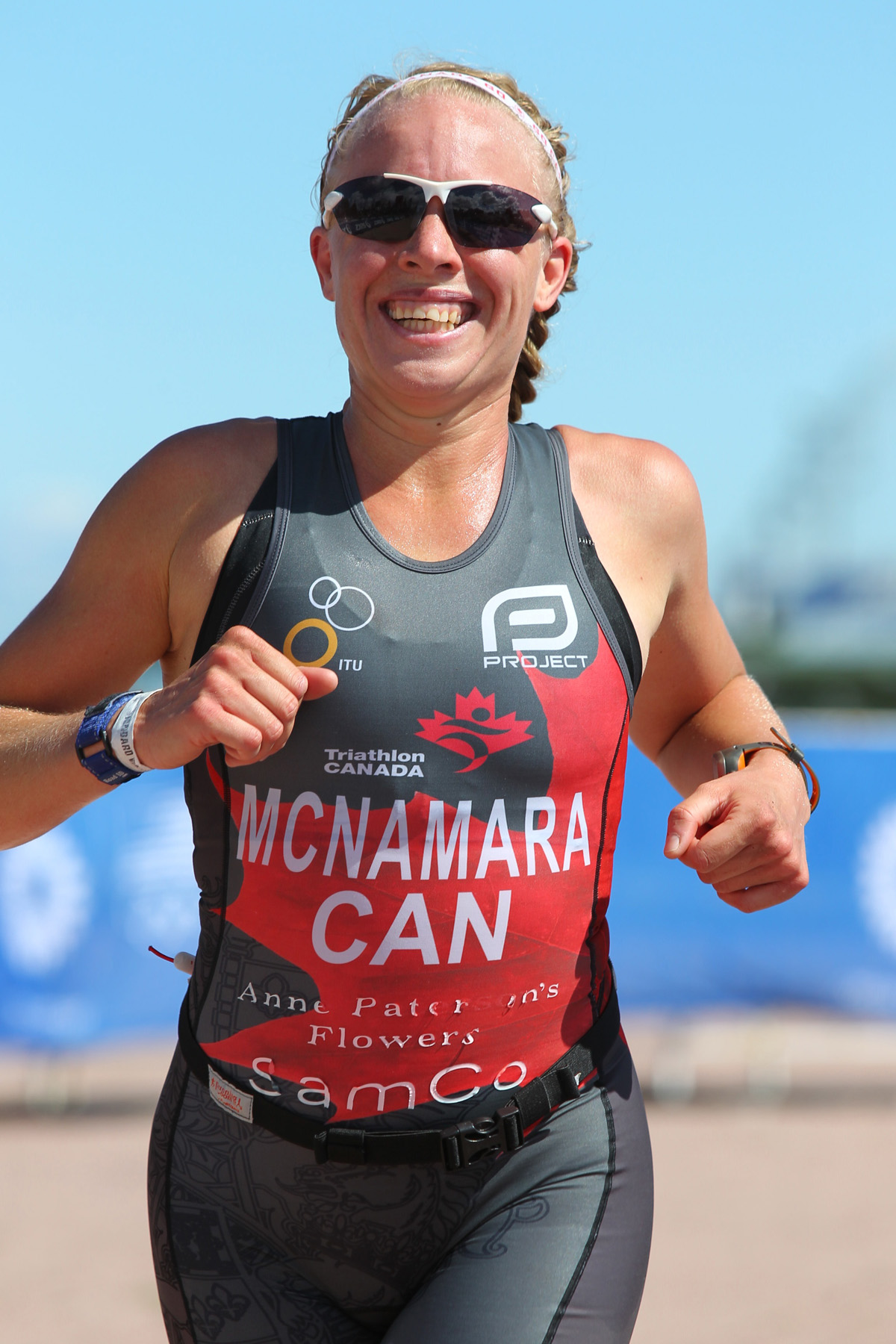
ITU World Championships 2015

McNamara was the 2015 British Columbia Provincial Sprint Triathlon Champion.

McNamara raced her first triathlon in 2012, placing 14th in her division at the SheRox San Diego Triathlon. She trained under coach Clint Lien with the Mercury Rising Triathlon club in Victoria, British Columbia, Canada.

== Results ==
Year	Race	Division Place	Time
2019	Canadian National Championships (Standard)	1	2:15:00
2019	Ironman 70.3 Victoria	8	5:17:37
2015	ITU Edmonton Standard Triathlon	2	2:39:34
2015	BC Sprint Triathlon Provincial Championships	1	1:17:32
2015	Ironman 70.3 Victoria	40	5:59:34
2015	ITU Worlds Championships Standard Triathlon	69	2:39:54
2014	Vulcan Tinman Sprint Triathlon	2	1:00:27
2014	Chinook Half Iron Triathlon	6	7:01:41
2014	Turner Valley Sprint Triathlon	2	1:11:34
2014	Kelowna Apple Standard Triathlon	15	2:47:32
2014	ITU Worlds Championships Sprint Triathlon	45	1:24:40
2013	Vulcan Tinman Sprint Triathlon	5	1:06:14
2013	ITU Edmonton Olympic Triathlon	16	3:12:11
2013	Magrath Sprint Triathlon	2	1:36:17
2013	Tri Rock San Diego Sprint Triathlon	46	1:34:36
2012	Innisfail Sprint Triathlon (Relay)	7	1:31:57
2012	San Diego SheRox Sprint Triathlon	14	1:18:31

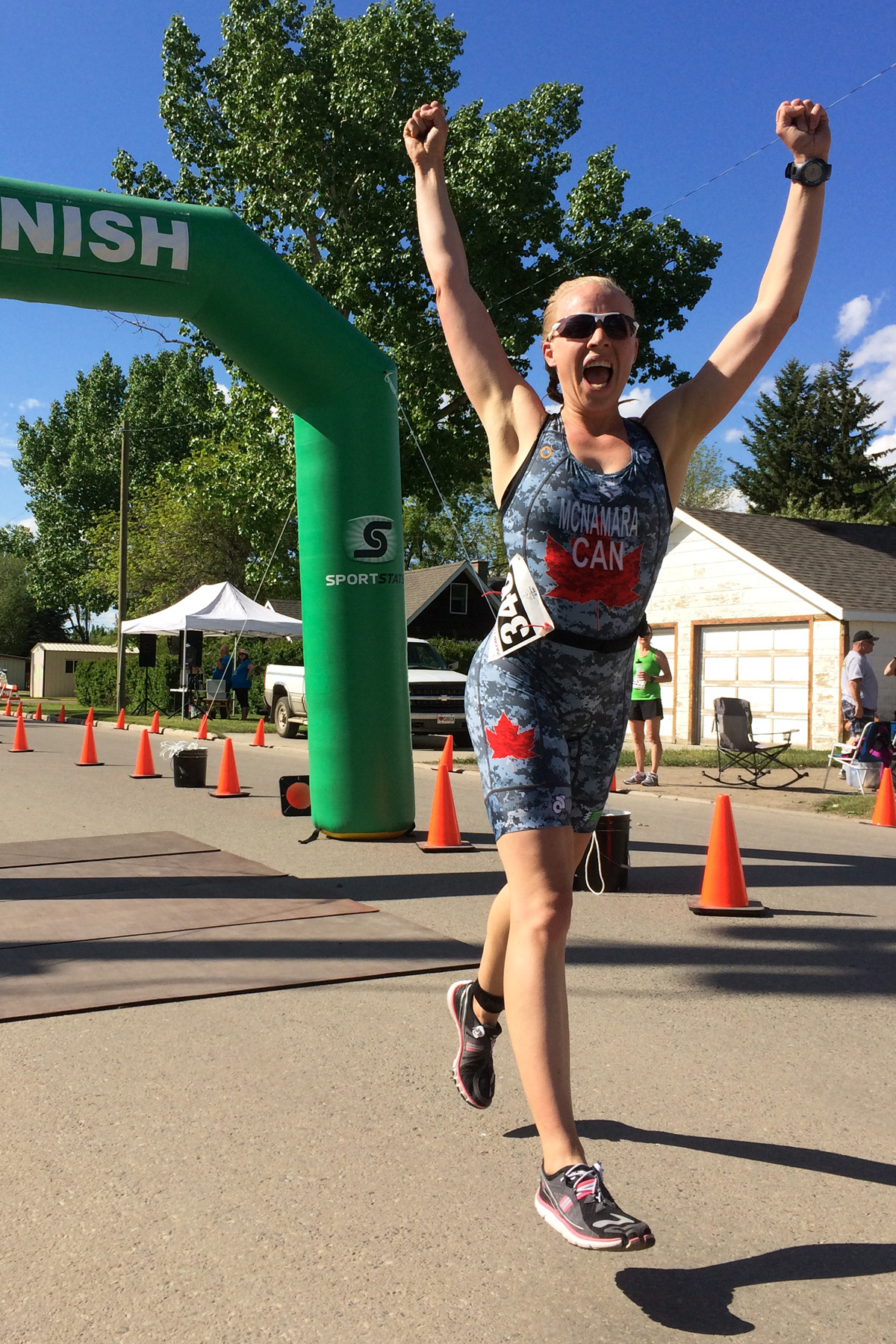
Vulcan, 2014

Source: karmenmcnamara.com (Retrieved November 24, 2016)
