= El Carmen, Santa Cruz =

Coordinates: 17.8494°S 63.25°W

El Carmen (Santa Cruz)
- Town
- Interactive map of El Carmen (Santa Cruz)
- Country: Bolivia
- Time zone: UTC-4 (BOT)

El Carmen (Santa Cruz) is a town in Bolivia. In 2009 it had an estimated population of 19,382.
