= Carmine Tucci =

Italian ice hockey player

Personal information
- Nationality: Italian
- Born: 27 December 1933 Bolzano, Italy
- Died: 25 February 1990 (aged 56) Sault Ste. Marie, Ontario, Canada

Sport
- Sport: Ice hockey

Carmine Tucci (27 December 1933 – 25 February 1990) was an Italian ice hockey player. He competed in the men's tournament at the 1956 Winter Olympics.
