= Carmen Aranegui =

Spanish archaeologist

Carmen Aranegui Ph.D.
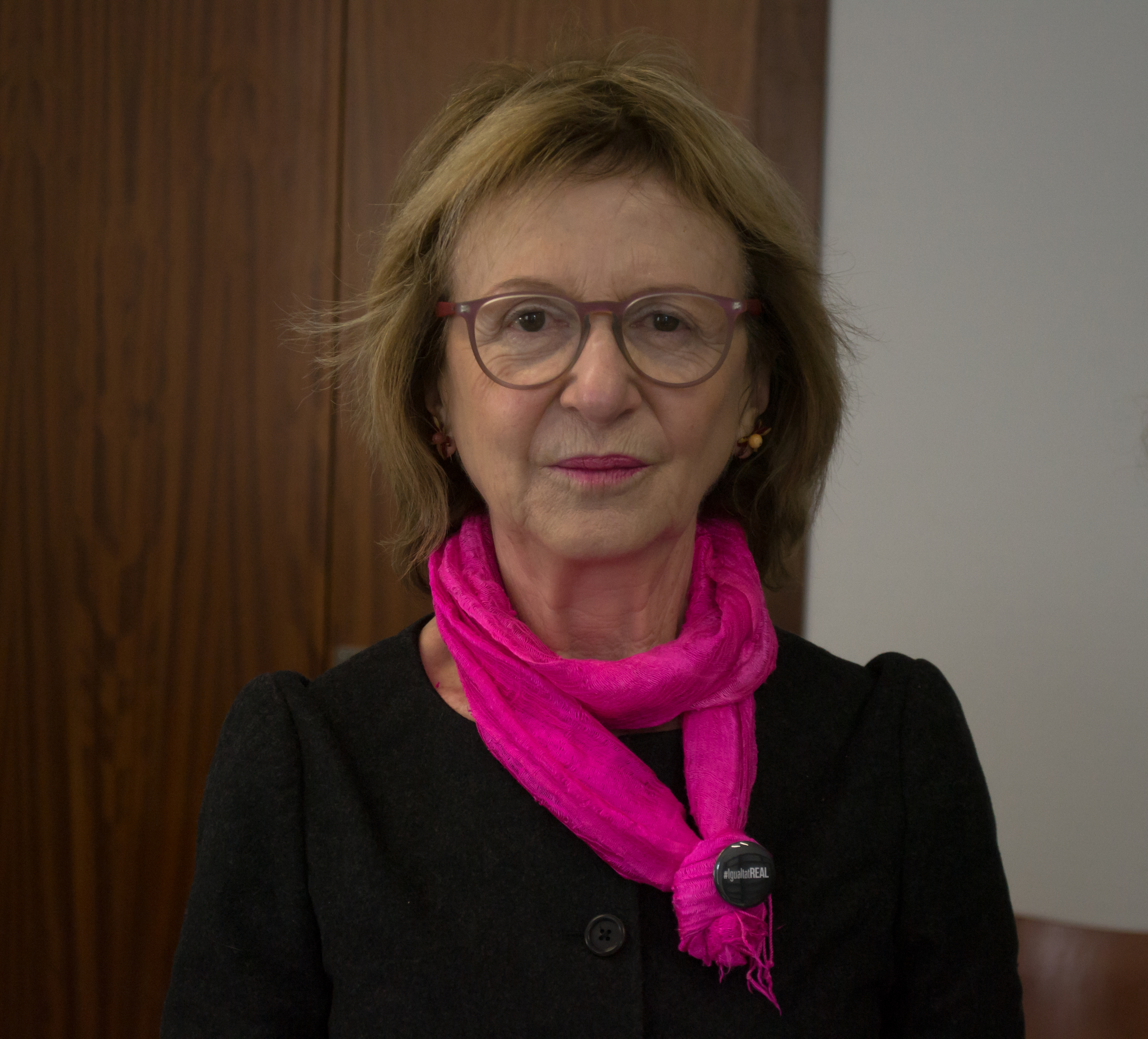
- Carmen Aranegui Gascó (2017)
- Born: 1945 (age 80–81); Valencia, Spain
- Education: University of Valencia
- Awards: Lluís Guarner Prize
- Scientific career
- Fields: Archaeology
- Workplaces: University of Valencia
- Doctoral advisor: Miquel Tarradell

Carmen Aranegui Gascó (born 1945 in Valencia) is a Spanish archaeologist and university professor. In 2019, the Generalitat Valenciana awarded the Lluís Guarner Prize to Aranegui for "her professional merits in the field of archaeology and for her career in historical research."

== Biography ==
Carmen Aranegui Gascó was born in Valencia, Spain in 1945.

She began teaching archaeology at the university in 1970.

She received her doctorate in 1972, from the University of Valencia, where she has been a professor of Archaeology since 1986. She is currently an emeritus professor.

Aranegui is the author of works such as Sagunto. Oppidum, emporio y ayuntamiento romano (2004), and Los iberos ayer y hoy. Archaeologies and cultures (2012). She is also the scientific editor of the archaeological memoirs of the excavations of Grau Vell, Sagunto, and Lixus, among other works. She excavated the port of Sagunto since 1974, also directing the archaeological study of the restoration and rehabilitation project of the Roman theatre of said city and its surroundings. Between 1995 and 2009, she carried out excavations at the archaeological site of Lixus, near Larache, Morocco. She has also carried out excavations in Oliva, Ifac, La Serreta, Segaria and Cabezo Lucero.

== Awards ==
The Generalitat Valenciana awarded the Lluís Guarner Prize to Aranegui in 2019 for "her professional merits in the field of archaeology and for her career in historical research."
