= William Cartman =

English cricketer

William Henry Cartman (20 June 1861 – 16 January 1935) was an English first-class cricketer, who played three matches for Yorkshire in 1891.

Born in Skipton, Yorkshire, England, Cartman was a right-handed batsman, he scored 129 runs at an average of 14.33, with a best of 49 in a losing cause against Liverpool and District on his debut. He also appeared in a first-class game for L Hall's Yorkshire XI in 1891, with Yorkshire's Second XI in 1893.

Cartman was a free-scoring batsman in club cricket, who lived most of his live in Skipton. He was professional at Skipton C.C. for a time and, in 1884 against Keighley Albion, he scored 150 (with R. H. Sidgwick 205 not out) in their total of 485. He was professional for two years at Enfield C.C., in Lancashire. Captain of Skipton R. U. club, he kept the Brick Hall Hotel, headquarters of the club in the early 1890s.

He died in Skipton aged 73, in January 1935.
