= Carmine Zoccali =

Italian nephrologist and clinical investigator

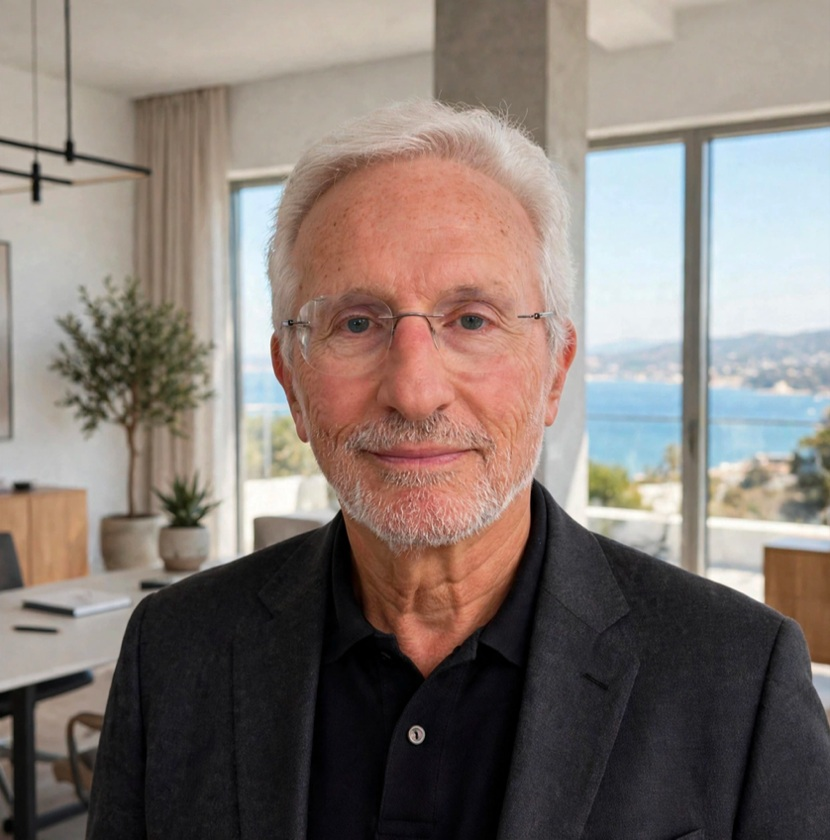
- Born: Jan 27th 1947 (age 79)
- Citizenship: Italian
- Education: University of Rome, University of Pisa
- Known for: Cardiovascular Risk in Chronic Kidney Disease (CKD), Risk factors for CKD progression, Endothelial dysfunction and hypertension in CKD and in End Stage Kidney Disease (ESKD), Epidemiology of kidney diseases
- Scientific career
- Fields: Nephrology, dialysis, epidemiology, hypertension
- Workplaces: past director CNR (National Research Council of Italy)-Clinical Physiology Institute (Clinical Epidemiology of Renal Diseases and Hypertension Unit). past director Nephrology, Dialysis and Transplantation Division, Garnde Ospedale Metropolitano, Reggio Calabria, Italy Associated Investigator, Institute of Biology and Genetic Medicine (BIOGEM), Ariano Irpino, Italy President, Associazione Ipertensione, Nefrologia, Trapianto (IPNET), Reggio Calabria, Italy Associated Investigator, Renal Research Institute, New York, USA.

Dr Zoccali is an Italian nephrologist and a clinical investigator. He has contributed to research in several fields, most notably hypertension and cardiovascular complications in chronic kidney disease (CKD), CKD progression and the clinical epidemiology of kidney diseases at large. He is known for his studies on cardiovascular risk in CKD and dialysis patients. He was among the earliest investigators that focused on the relevance of endothelial dysfunction and inflammation for the high risk of cardiovascular disease in these populations. In this research area, he was the first to link endogenous inhibitors of the nitric oxide system with death and cardiovascular disease. and the first to document a relationship between sympathetic over-activity and these outcomes Dr Zoccali is a practicing specialist in Nephrology, with a national qualification for the full professorship in Nephrology. He is also a specialist in hypertension, certified by the European Society of Hypertension (ESH).

== Education ==
He received his education in medicine from the University of Rome where he graduated in 1971. He then specialized in Nephrology at the Pisa University. His nephrology mentor was Professor Quirino Maggiore, the investigator who, in the sixties, proposed a special low-protein diet (the Giovannetti-Maggiore diet) for the control of uremic symptoms and invented cold dialysis in the early eighties. Dr Zoccali was trained in clinical research in hypertension at the Medical Research Council (MRC) BP Unit in Glasgow (1981-1982) and in Epidemiology and Biostatistics at the Rotterdam University where he attended several Erasmus Summer School courses in 1989–1993.

== Career ==
He was a Clinical Research Fellow at the Glasgow BP Unit (1981-1982) where he worked with Dr Jehoiada Brown, Antony Lever, Jan Robertson, Stephen Ball and Peter Simple on several projects on hypertension. Back in Italy, he worked at the main hospital of Reggio Calabria as vice-director of the Renal Unit. In 1991 he became Director of the Division of Nephrology at Grande Ospedale Metropolitano of Reggio Calabria, which he directed till April 2014 and, from 1994 to 2002, Director of the CNR - Center of Clinical Physiology associated with the same Division. Presently dr. Zoccali is an Associated Investigator, Institute of Biology and Genetic Medicine (BIOGEM), Ariano Irpino, Italy; President, Associazione Ipertensione, Nefrologia, Trapianto (IPNET), Reggio Calabria, Italy; Associated Investigator to the Renal Research Institute (RRI), New York, USA, and has several ongoing international collaborations. Dr Zoccali has authored more than 1000 publications listed in PubMed which have been cited >80,000 times. As of August 24^{th} 2026, his h-index is 144 (86 from 2021) and evolving. On the same date, he is ranked as the top European expert in CKD (the 6th on a world scale) and Chronic Kidney Failure (the 11th on a world scale) by Expertscape, a ranking system of expert physicians. He is above the 97,5th percentile among investigators evaluated by ResearchGate In an analysis by Ioannidis et al. across twenty-seven scientific fields, from physics and astronomy to clinical medicine, between January 1st, 1996 until December 31st, 2017 he was among the 4000 most productive scientists during this period. In Italy, he is ranked as the 26th clinical scientist by Via Academy an independent ranking system of academicians in Italy.

Dr Zoccali was chairman of the European Renal Association - European Dialysis and Transplant Association (ERA-EDTA) Registry (2003-2009) and served the same society as president for the triennium 2017-2020 He is Editor Emeritus of Nephrology Dialysis Transplantation. Past-member of the Scientific Advisory Board of the ERA-EDTA and the ERA-EDTA European Best Practice Committee. He was the founding Editor of NDT- Educational, the online educational resource of the same society. He was also President of the Italian Society of Nephrology from 2006 to 2008.

He is presently an active editorial board member of the Clinical Journal of the American Society of Nephrology, (CJASN) Hypertension, Journal of Hypertension, American Journal of Kidney Diseases, American Journal of Nephrology (Associated Editor), Clinical Kidney Journal, the European Journal of Clinical Investigation (section Editor for Kidney Diseases), Nephron, Clinical Nephrology, Turkish Journal of Nephrology and the Portuguese Journal of Nephrology and Hypertension. He served as an editorial board member of other nephrology journals, including the Journal of the American Society of Nephrology (JASN), Kidney International, Journal of Nephrology (as Deputy Editor).

== Awards ==
Dr Zoccali has received the 2003 National Kidney Foundation International Award, the 2009 International Dorso Award, the 2018 Richard Yu award of the Hong Kong Society of Nephrology and the 2019 Gabriele Monasterio award of the Italian Society of Nephrology. He is a distinguished fellow of ERA-EDTA, the American Society of Nephrology and the National Kidney Foundation, and an honorary member of the Spanish and Polish societies of Nephrology. In 2018 he was named Doctor Honoris Causa of the University of Oviedo, and in 2019 had the same recognition by the University of Patras (2019).
