= Carmen (surname) =

Carmen is a surname. Notable people with the name include:

- Eric Carmen (1949–2024), American singer, songwriter
- Ira Carmen (born 1934), American professor
- Jean Carmen (1913–1993), American actress
- Jeanne Carmen (1930–2007), American model and actress
- Jewel Carmen (1897–1984), American actress
- Julie Carmen (born 1954), American actress
- Loene Carmen (born 1973), American actress
- Marie Carmen (born 1959), Canadian singer and actor
- Phil Carmen (born 1953), Swiss musician and producer
- Richard Carmen (born 1968), American actor
- Sybil Carmen (1896–1929), American actress and dancer

== See also ==
- Carman (surname)
- Carmon, surname
- Carmin (disambiguation), includes list of people with name Carmin
