= Carmen Rodríguez (politician) =

Bolivian politician (born 1949)

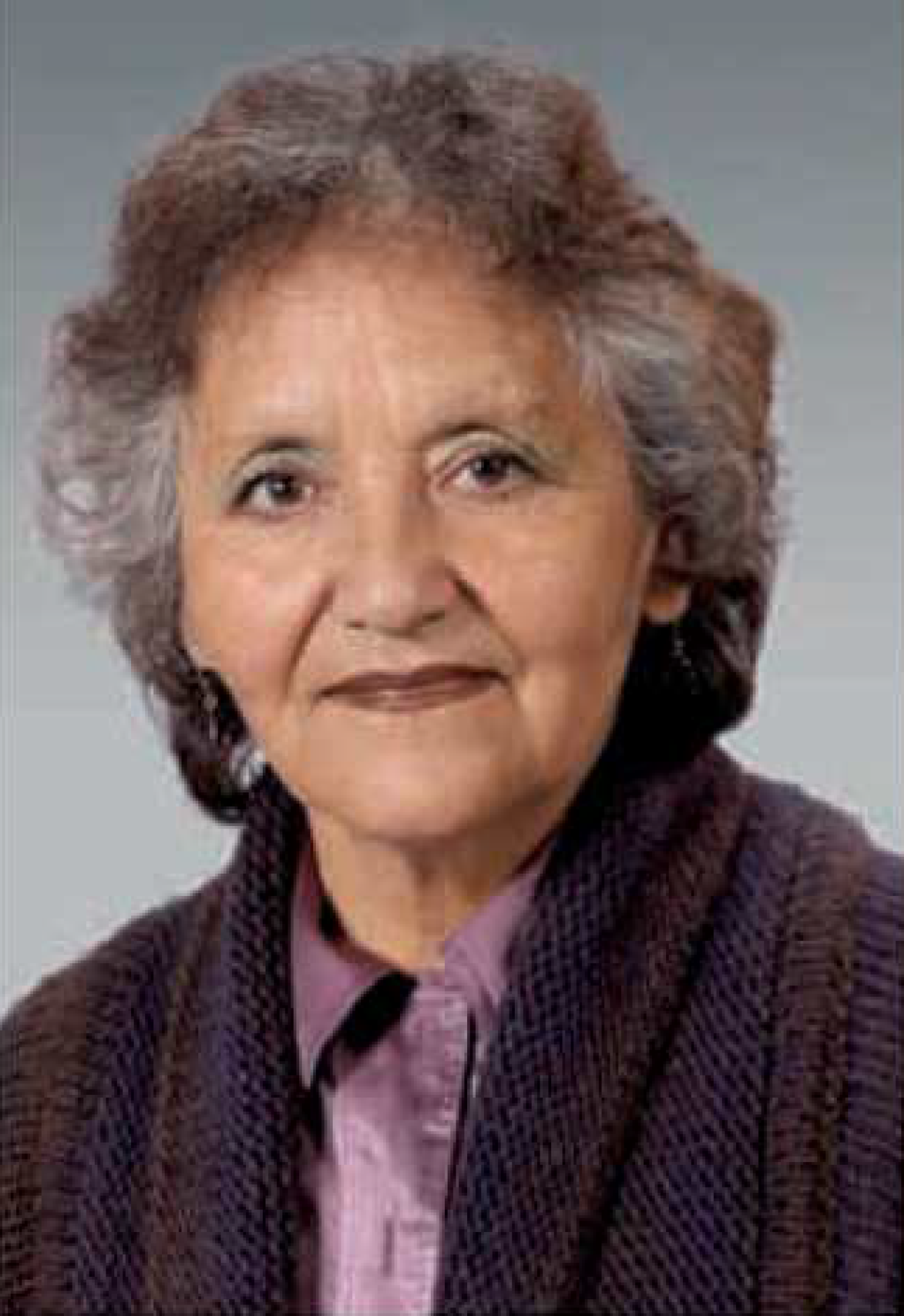
- Official portrait, 2014

Member of the Chamber of Deputies from La Paz
- In office 19 January 2010 – 18 January 2015
- Substitute: Elías Quelca
- Preceded by: Félix García
- Succeeded by: Toribia Pomacusi
- Constituency: Party list

Personal details
- Born: Carmen Leonor Rodríguez Bolaños; 15 July 1949 (age 77) La Paz, Bolivia
- Party: Movement for Socialism
- Education: Higher University of San Andrés
- Occupation: Economist; politician; trade unionist

Carmen Leonor Rodríguez Bolaños (born 15 July 1949) is a Bolivian economist, politician, and trade unionist who served as a party-list member of the Chamber of Deputies from La Paz from 2010 to 2015.

Raised in the mines of Quechisla, Rodríguez studied economics at the Higher University of San Andrés, during which time she involved herself in student activism. After leaving university, she dedicated herself to a long career in the private sector, only assuming positions in trade unionism after retirement. She held roles within the National Confederation of Retirees and was executive of the Light, Strength, Telephones National Federation of Retirees from 2008 to 2010.

In 2009, Rodríguez was nominated for a seat in the Chamber of Deputies, a product of the solid alliance between the Movement for Socialism and the country's leading retirees unions. Elected to represent La Paz, she primarily performed her parliamentary duties from the lower chamber's Social Policy Commission until the conclusion of her term in 2015. She was not nominated for reelection.

== Early life and career ==
=== Early life and education ===
Carmen Rodríguez was born on 15 July 1949 to Carlos Rodríguez and Elena Bolaños. Although born in La Paz, Rodríguez spent the majority of her childhood residing in the mining community of Quechisla, Potosí, where her father was employed as a mineworker in the service of the Quechisla Mining Company, a subsidiary of the Bolivian Mining Corporation. Her mother, likewise, also worked in the mines as a rural school professor. Rodríguez received only a primary education, completing up to fifth grade as part of the first class of students to attend Quechisla's newly founded schoolhouse.

In 1965, Rodríguez left her family and moved back to La Paz to pursue higher education. She studied economics at the Higher University of San Andrés, where she became active in the student movement, first as a member of various student centers before later acceding the Local University Federation, where she performed secretarial tasks. Her involvement in student activism came during a period of political radicalism for the movement, oriented toward left-wing politics and social struggle. At a time of dictatorial rule in the country, such activism was often met with reprisals, and Rodríguez even endured arrest at one point.

=== Career and trade unionism ===
Shortly after leaving university, Rodríguez returned to the mines, where she briefly worked as a mathematics professor. Realizing the job wasn't for her, she moved back to La Paz and dedicated herself to a career in business, first as an employee for a local textile company, then as a member of the mutual organization La Primera, and finally as a worker at the La Paz Telecommunications Cooperative (COTEL).

Rodríguez's entry into union activity did not occur until after she retired, an atypical circumstance, given the relative youth of most individuals who initiate trade union careers. She first joined the COTEL Retirees Federation before later becoming a member of the National Confederation of Retirees, where she focused her efforts on activities relating to social control, overseeing the work of state-run hospitals to ensure they met basic standards for her sector. By 2008, Rodríguez had risen to the position of executive of the Light, Strength, Telephones National Federation of Retirees, a position she held until early 2010.

== Chamber of Deputies ==
=== Election ===
Since the 2005 elections, the union sector representing retirees and pensioners had aligned itself with the ruling Movement for Socialism (MAS-IPSP), a pact that procured positions for affiliated members on the party's parliamentary lists. In 2009, the National Confederation of Retirees' political arm selected Rodríguez as their candidate for that year's general election, through which she acceded to a seat in the Chamber of Deputies in representation of La Paz.

=== Tenure ===
In parliament, Rodríguez's work focused on legislating from the lower chamber's Social Policy Commission. She held seats on the commission's committees for four of the five years she was in office, serving on the Social Welfare Committee for one term and on the Labor Committee for three, including chairing said body from 2012 to 2013.^{[§]} During her tenure, non-contributory pension coverage in Bolivia reached ninety-seven percent of the retired population – the highest in the region. At the end of her term, Rodríguez was not nominated for reelection.

=== Commission assignments ===
- Plural Justice, Prosecutor's Office, and Legal Defense of the State Commission
  - Ordinary Jurisdiction and Magistracy Council Committee (2013–2014)
- Social Policy Commission
  - Labor and Employment Law Committee (2010–2012; Secretary: 2012–2013)
  - Social Welfare and Protection Committee (2014–2015)

== Electoral history ==
Electoral history of Carmen Rodríguez
Year	Office	Party	Votes			Result	Ref.
Year	Office	Party	Total	%	P.	Result	Ref.
2009	Deputy	Movement for Socialism	1,099,259	80.28%	1st	Won	(Note: Presented on an electoral list. The data shown represents the share of the vote the entire party/alliance received in that constituency.)
Source: Plurinational Electoral Organ | Electoral Atlas

Chamber of Deputies of Bolivia
Preceded by Félix García	Member of the Chamber of Deputies from La Paz; 2010–2015	Succeeded by Toribia Pomacusi
