= Carme (given name) =

- Pronunciation: EN: kär'mē; CAT: kär'mā; GAL: kär'mē.
- Gender: female

Origin
- Origin: Hebrew and Greek, respectively
- Meaning: "garden" and "harvester"
- Region of origin: Spain, English-speaking countries

Other names
- Related names: Carmelita, Carmelito, Carmelina, Carmelino, Carmella, Carmela, Carmelo, Carmel, Carmen, Carmina, Carmine, Carmo
- The "garden" origin is from Hebrew karmel; the "harvester" origin is from Greek Karmē; the two origins are unrelated

Carme is a feminine given name of two separate origins. The first is a Galician and Catalan form of Hebrew karmel, "garden". The second is from Greek Karmē, whose name means "she who cuts the grain", from keirein, "to cut".

== People ==
- Carme Figueras, a Catalan politician
- Carme Laura Gil, a Catalan professor
- Carme Pinós, a Catalan architect
- Carme Riera, a Catalan professor
- Carme Ruscalleda, a Catalan chef

== Other ==
- Carme (mythology), a figure in Greek mythology.

== See also ==
- Carle, surnames
- Carle (given name)
- Karmei Tzur
- Carmen (given name)
