= Carmin =

Carmin may refer to:

- "Carmín" (song), song from Romeo Santos album Golden
- Isaac H. Carmin (1841–1919), American soldier
- Carmín Vega (born 1955), Puerto Rican singer and comedian

== See also ==
- Carman (disambiguation)
- Carmen (disambiguation)
- Carmine (disambiguation)
