= Norbert Holtkamp =

German-American physicist and Fermilab director

8th Director of the Fermilab
- In office January 12, 2026 – Present
- Preceded by: Young-Kee Kim (interim)
- Scientific career
- Education: Technical University of Darmstadt
- Known for: Accelerator Physics
- Fields: Physics
- Workplaces: SLAC National Accelerator Laboratory; Fermilab; Oak Ridge National Laboratory; ITER Organization; Hoover Institution

Norbert Holtkamp is a German-American physicist and science administrator. In December 2025, he was appointed the Director of Fermi National Accelerator Laboratory (Fermilab), effective January 2026.

He previously served as the Deputy Laboratory Director of SLAC National Accelerator Laboratory at Stanford University, where he led the LCLS-II X-ray laser upgrade project. He also served as Principal Deputy Director-General of the ITER fusion project in France.

== Education ==
He earned the equivalent of a Master's degree in physics from the Free University of Berlin and a PhD in physics from the Technische Universität Darmstadt.

== Career ==
=== Early Career and DESY ===
Holtkamp began his career at the Deutsches Elektronen-Synchrotron (DESY). From 1992 to 1998, he was head of the research group responsible for the operation of injector linear accelerators. He also led a research group developing a normal-conducting S-Band Linear Collider concept.

=== Fermilab (1998–2001) ===
In 1998, Holtkamp joined Fermi National Accelerator Laboratory (Fermilab). He was involved in the commissioning of the Main Injector. He also led a multi-laboratory study commissioned by the Fermilab Directorate on the technical feasibility of a high-intensity neutrino source based on a muon storage ring (often referred to as a "Neutrino Factory").

=== Oak Ridge National Laboratory (SNS) ===
In 2001, Holtkamp moved to Oak Ridge National Laboratory (ORNL) to serve as the Director of the Accelerator Systems Division for the Spallation Neutron Source (SNS). Holtkamp received the 2008 Gersh Budker Prize for his role in the project.

=== ITER Organization ===
In 2006, Holtkamp was nominated as the Principal Deputy Director-General of the ITER Organization, an international nuclear fusion megaproject based in Cadarache, France. He served as the Project Construction Leader for the tokamak reactor design.

=== SLAC National Accelerator Laboratory ===
Holtkamp joined SLAC in 2010. He was Deputy Laboratory Director between 2014 and 2022 and led the LCLS-II (Linac Coherent Light Source II) project.

=== Hoover Institution ===
Prior to his return to Fermilab, Holtkamp was also a Science Fellow at the Hoover Institution at Stanford University.

=== Return to Fermilab ===
On December 15, 2025, the University of Chicago and Universities Research Association announced Holtkamp's appointment as the next Director of Fermilab, succeeding interim director Young-Kee Kim. He assumed the role of director on January 12, 2026.

== Awards and honors ==
- 2008: Gersh Budker Prize, European Physical Society (EPS) Accelerator Group
- Fellow of the American Physical Society
