= RepoForge =

RepoForge (formerly RPMforge) is a repository of software packages for Red Hat Enterprise Linux and derivatives such as CentOS and Scientific Linux. It provides many packages in the rpm package format to these distributions. RepoForge also has many RPM packages available for old distributions like Red Hat 6 and earlier, after they are no longer supported by their vendors. Their repository can be accessed via package management products like apt-get and yum; up2date does not work any more due to expired SSL keys.

RepoForge is "dead" since July 2016 in the sense that no development occurs (this process started long before that with the introduction of the EPEL (Extra Packages for Enterprise Linux) repositories), but it is still accessible on the Web. Large parts have also been archived elsewhere.

Nowadays system is outdated and new updates were uploaded for a long time
