= Lia Merminga =

Greek-Canadian-American physicist

7th Director of the Fermilab
- In office April 18, 2022 – January 13, 2025
- President: Joe Biden
- Preceded by: Nigel Lockyer
- Succeeded by: Young-Kee Kim (interim)

Personal details
- Born: Nikolitsa Merminga
- Scientific career
- Education: University of Michigan
- Known for: Accelerator Physics
- Fields: Physics
- Workplaces: SLAC National Accelerator Laboratory; Thomas Jefferson National Accelerator Facility; TRIUMF; Fermilab
- Thesis: A study of nonlinear dynamics in the Fermilab Tevatron (1989)
- Doctoral advisor: Lawrence W. Jones, Donald A. Edwards

Nikolitsa (Lia) Merminga is a Greek-born accelerator physicist. In 2022, she was appointed director of Fermi National Accelerator Laboratory, the first woman to hold the position. She has worked at other national laboratories in Canada and the United States.

== Education ==
Merminga grew up in Greece, where she attended all-girl middle and high schools. By the time she was sixteen years old, she knew she wanted to be a physicist, having been inspired by her family members, a high school physics teacher, and a biography of Marie Curie. She received her undergraduate degree from National and Kapodistrian University of Athens in 1983, where she studied physics. She then moved to the United States to pursue a PhD in physics at the University of Michigan. There, she completed a Master's of Science in Physics and a Master's of Science in Mathematics and worked with doctoral advisors Lawrence W. Jones and Donald A. Edwards. She completed her thesis, A Study of Nonlinear Dynamics in the Fermilab Tevatron, using data from Fermilab's Tevatron particle accelerator and completed her PhD in 1989.

== Career ==
After completing her PhD, Merminga held a postdoctoral position at SLAC National Accelerator Laboratory in the accelerator theory group. In 1992, she joined Thomas Jefferson National Accelerator Facility as a member of the Center for Advanced Studies of Accelerators (CASA). In 2002, she became director of CASA's beam physics group, her first managerial position. In 2008, she joined Canada's TRIUMF laboratory as head of their accelerator program, one of the most senior scientific positions in Canada. There, she oversaw the design and construction of an accelerator that produced rare isotopes for use in medicine and nuclear physics. She returned to SLAC in 2015, when she became that lab's Associate Director for Accelerators and a professor at Stanford University. Around the same time, she took on another leadership role as a member of the U.S. Department of Energy's inaugural Energy Sciences Leadership Group from 2016 to 2017. Merminga returned to Fermilab in 2018 as director of the lab's Proton Improvement Plan II (PIP-II) project, the first particle accelerator project with major contributions by other countries to be hosted in the United States.

On 5 April 2022, it was announced that Merminga had been appointed as the next director of Fermilab. In addition to her role at Fermilab, as of February 10, 2023, Merminga serves as a member of the Board of Trustees at Illinois State University.

On 13 January 2025 it was announced that Merminga stepped down as director of Fermilab, effective immediately. Young-Kee Kim was named as interim director.

== Awards and honors ==
- Elected as a Fellow of the American Physical Society (APS), in 2006, after a nomination from the APS Division of Physics of Beams, "for leadership in designing and developing energy recovery linacs, and applications to light sources and electron-ion colliders"
- Minerva BC Women In™ Science Community Leadership and Excellence Award, 2013
- Member of the U.S. Department of Energy's inaugural Energy Sciences Leadership Group, 2016-2017
