= Patricia McBride (physicist) =

American physicist

- Born: United States
- Education: Yale University (PhD), Carnegie Mellon University (Bs)
- Known for: CMS Deputy Spokesperson (2018-2020) at CERN
- Scientific career
- Fields: Particle physics
- Workplaces: Fermilab

Patricia L. McBride is an American particle physicist working with the CMS collaboration at the LHC. On February 9, 2022, she was elected Spokesperson for CMS starting Fall 2022.

Dr. McBride studied physics in college at Carnegie Mellon. She received her PhD from Yale University and did a postdoc at Harvard University. She started working at Fermilab in 1994 where she participated in many experiments and had various leadership roles. Patricia has been a part of the CMS collaboration since 2005, working as head of the CMS Center at Fermilab from 2012 to 2013 and, later, as U.S. CMS operations program manager. In 2014, she became head of the Fermilab Particle Physics Division, where she served for four years.

She has served on many national and international committees, and was the chair of the Division of Particles and Fields of the American Physical Society (APS), the U.S. Liaison Committee of the International Union of Pure and Applied Physics (IUPAP) and the IUPAP C11 Commission for Particles and Fields. She is currently a member of the AURA NCOA Management Oversight Council, J-PARC International Advisory Committee and AUI Visiting Committee for NRAO. She was elected as a Fellow of the American Physical Society and a Fellow of the American Association for the Advancement of Science in 2009.
