= Piermaria Oddone =

Peruvian-American particle physicist

Pier Oddone
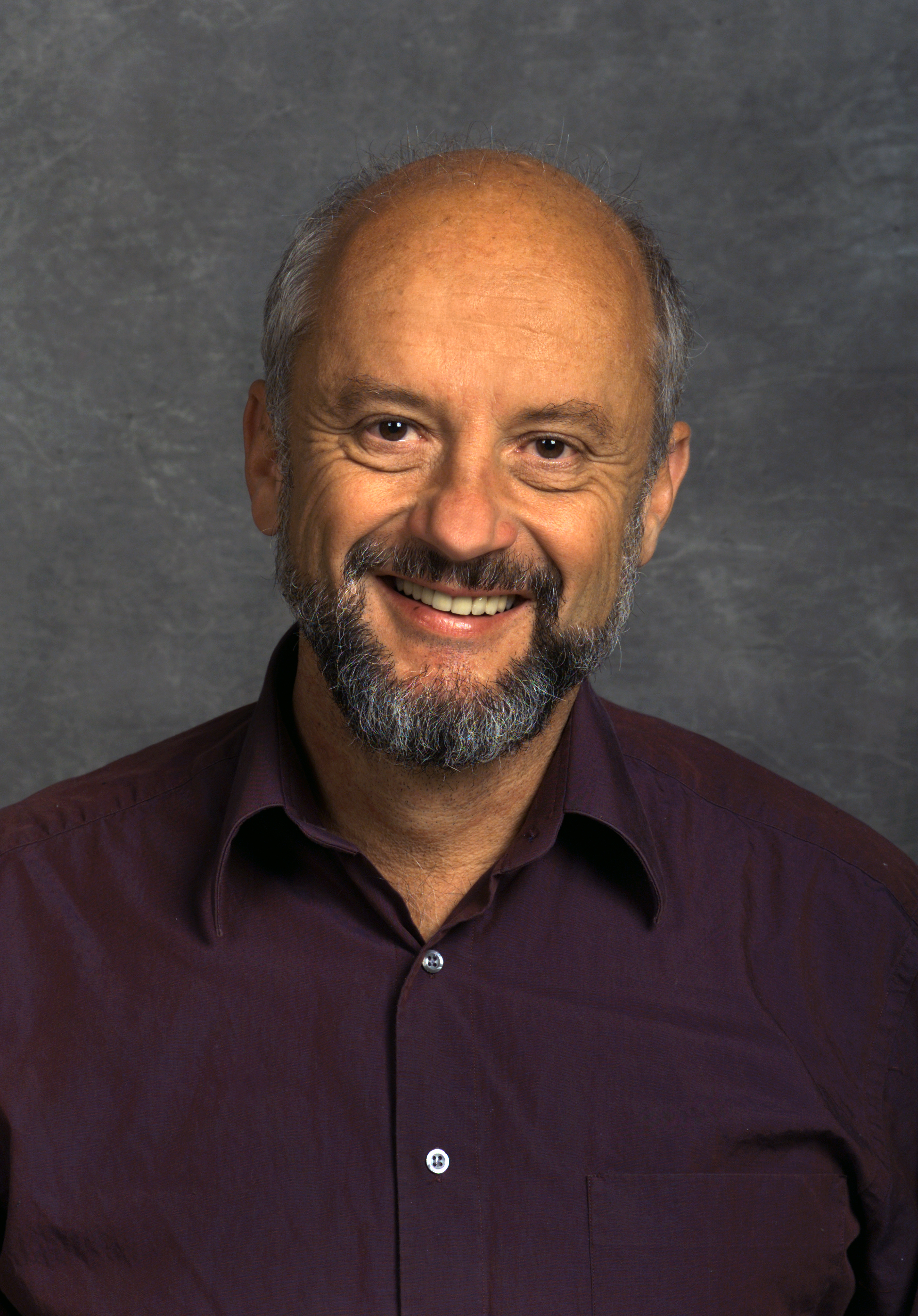
- Pier Oddone

5th Director of the Fermilab
- In office July 1, 2005 – July 1, 2013
- President: George W. Bush; Barack Obama
- Preceded by: Michael S. Witherell
- Succeeded by: Nigel Lockyer

Personal details
- Born: Piermaria Jorge Oddone; 26 March 1944 (age 82) Arequipa, Peru
- Education: Massachusetts Institute of Technology (BS); Princeton University (PhD)

Piermaria Jorge Oddone (born March 26, 1944, in Arequipa, Peru) is a Peruvian-American particle physicist.

Oddone earned his bachelor's degree in physics at the Massachusetts Institute of Technology in 1965 and a PhD in physics from Princeton University in 1970.

From 1972, Oddone worked at the US Department of Energy’s Lawrence Berkeley National Laboratory. In 1987 he was appointed director of the Physics Division at Berkeley Lab, and later became the laboratory deputy director for scientific programs. In 1987, he proposed the idea of using an Asymmetric B-factory to study the violation of CP symmetry in the decay of B-mesons.

In the late seventies and early eighties, Oddone was a member of the team that developed the first Time Projection Chamber (TPC). This technology was subsequently used for many particle and nuclear physics experiments. He led the TPC collaboration from 1984 to 1987.

He was appointed director of Fermi National Accelerator Laboratory (Fermilab) and took up office on 1 July 2005.

Oddone received the 2005 Panofsky Prize in Experimental Particle Physics for the invention of the Asymmetric B-Factory to carry out precision measurements of CP violation in B-meson decays.

He was elected Fellow of the American Physical Society in 1990 "for significant research in elementary- particle physics and contributions to the development of apparatus as well as of the infrastructure required for future advances of the field"

In 2011 at an international symposium held in Vatican City, he gave a talk Achievements in Subnuclear Physics at Fermilab. He was chair of the International Committee for Future Accelerators, a working group of the International Union of Pure and Applied Physics, from 2012 to 2013. In September 2012, Oddone announced he would retire on July 1, 2013, after 8 years serving as lab director.
