= Fermi National Accelerator Laboratory =

High-energy particle physics laboratory in Illinois, US

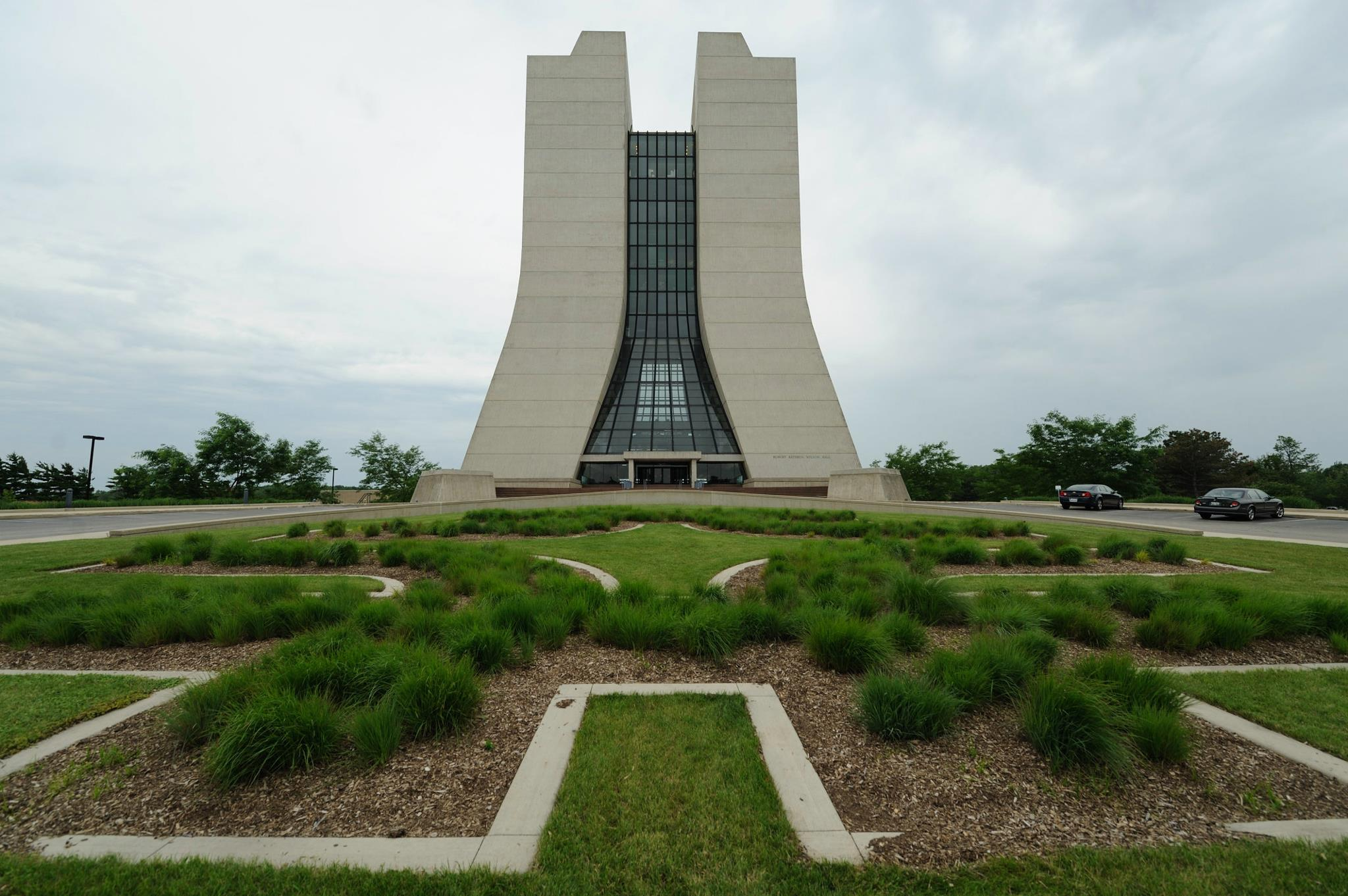
- Robert Rathbun Wilson Hall
- Nickname: Fermilab
- Established: November 21, 1967; 58 years ago (as National Accelerator Laboratory)
- Research type: Accelerator physics
- Budget: $739 million (2024)
- Field of research: Accelerator physics
- Director: Norbert Holtkamp
- Location: P.O. Box 500, Winfield Township, DuPage County, Illinois, United States; 41°49′55″N 88°15′26″W
- Affiliations: United States Department of Energy
- Operating agency: Fermi Forward Discovery Group, LLC
- Nobel laureates: Leon Max Lederman
- Website: fnal.gov

Map
- Location within Illinois

Fermi National Accelerator Laboratory (FNAL; branded as Fermilab) is a national laboratory for high-energy particle physics, located in Batavia, Illinois, United States, near Chicago. It is sponsored by the United States Department of Energy and operated by the University of Chicago through the subordinate Fermi Forward Discovery Group LLC.

Fermilab's Main Injector, two miles (3.3 km) in circumference, is the laboratory's most powerful particle accelerator. The accelerator complex that feeds the Main Injector is under upgrade, and construction of the first building for the new PIP-II linear accelerator began in 2020. Until 2011, Fermilab was the home of the 6.28 km (3.90 mi) circumference Tevatron accelerator. The ring-shaped tunnels of the Tevatron and the Main Injector are visible from the air and by satellite.

Fermilab aims to become a world center in neutrino physics. It is the host of the multi-billion dollar Deep Underground Neutrino Experiment (DUNE) now under construction. The project has suffered delays and, in 2022, the journals Science and Scientific American each published articles describing the project as "troubled". Ongoing neutrino experiments are ICARUS (Imaging Cosmic and Rare Underground Signals) and NOνA (NuMI Off-Axis ν_{e} Appearance). Completed neutrino experiments include MINOS (Main Injector Neutrino Oscillation Search), MINOS+, MiniBooNE and SciBooNE (SciBar Booster Neutrino Experiment) and MicroBooNE (Micro Booster Neutrino Experiment).

On-site experiments outside of the neutrino program include the SeaQuest fixed-target experiment and Muon g-2. Fermilab continues to participate in the work at the Large Hadron Collider (LHC); it serves as a Tier 1 site in the Worldwide LHC Computing Grid. Fermilab also pursues research in quantum information science. It founded the Fermilab Quantum Institute in 2019. Since 2020, it also is home to the SQMS (Superconducting Quantum Materials and Systems) Center.

Due to serious performance issues over the period of a decade, the Department of Energy established new management for Fermilab on January 1, 2025. Fermilab is currently managed by the Fermi Forward Discovery Group, LLC (FFDG). This consortium is led by the 2007-2024 management group, the Fermi Research Alliance (FRA), with Amentum Environment & Energy, Inc., and Longenecker & Associates as new additions. Due to the management crisis, the Director of the Laboratory, Lia Merminga, resigned on January 13, 2025 and is temporarily replaced by Acting Director Young-Kee Kim, from the University of Chicago.

Fermilab is a part of the Illinois Technology and Research Corridor. Argonne National Laboratory, which is another US DOE national laboratory, is located approximately 20 miles (30 kilometers) away.

== History ==
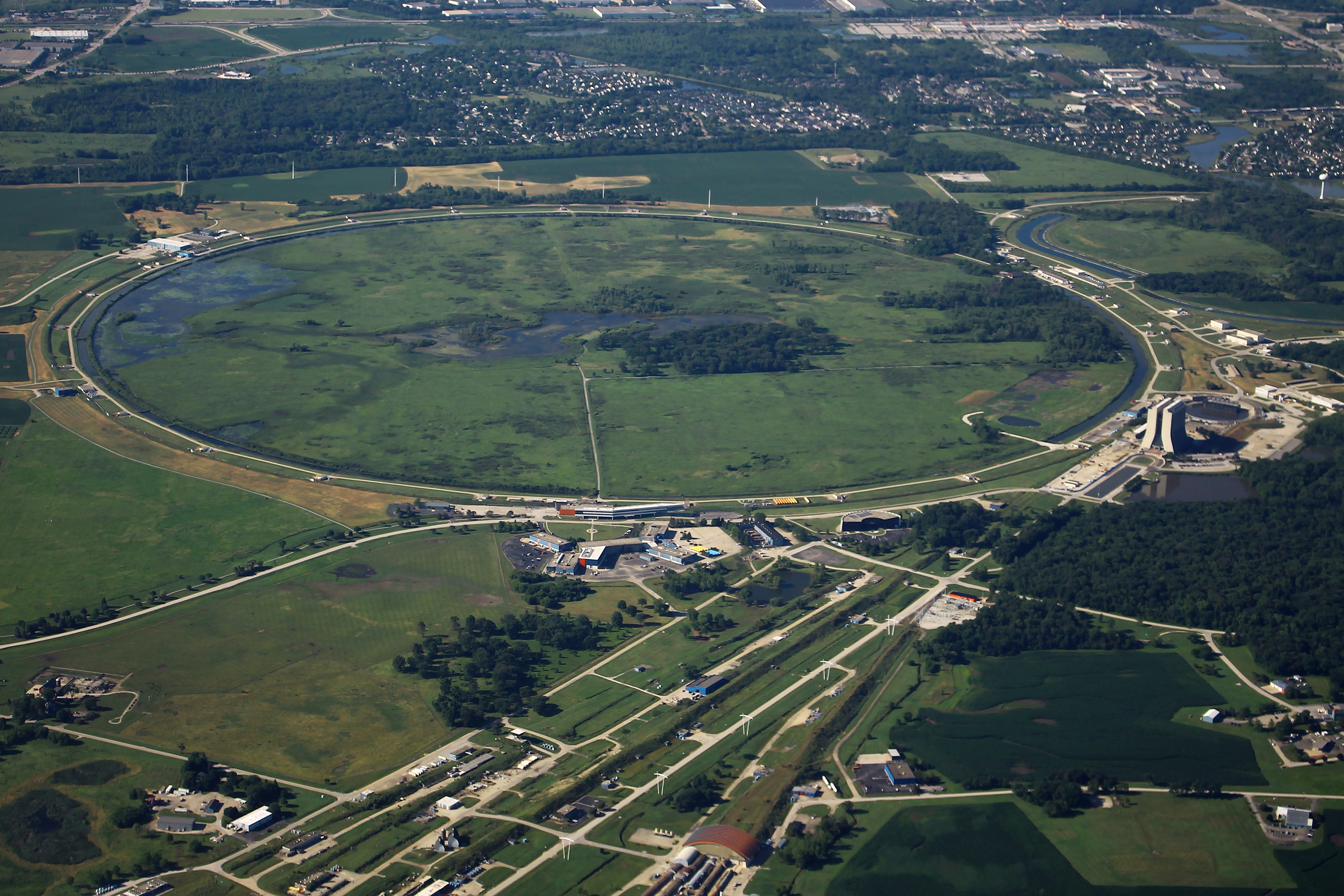
Aerial view

Weston, Illinois, was a community next to Batavia voted out of existence by its village board in 1966 to provide a site for Fermilab.

The laboratory was founded in 1969 as the National Accelerator Laboratory; it was renamed in honor of Enrico Fermi in 1974. The laboratory's first director was Robert Rathbun Wilson, under whom the laboratory opened ahead of time and under budget. Many of the sculptures on the site are of his creation. He is the namesake of the site's high-rise laboratory building, whose unique shape has become the symbol for Fermilab and which is the center of activity on the campus.

After Wilson stepped down in 1978 to protest the lack of funding for the lab, Leon M. Lederman took on the job. It was under his guidance that the original accelerator was replaced with the Tevatron, an accelerator capable of colliding protons and antiprotons at a combined energy of 1.96 TeV. Lederman stepped down in 1989 and remained director emeritus until his death. The science education center at the site was named in his honor.

== Laboratory directors ==
Since its founding in 1967, Fermilab has been led by 8 directors.

No.	Image	Director	Term start	Term end	Refs.
1		Robert Rathbun Wilson	1967	May 31, 1978	
2		Leon M. Lederman	June 1, 1979	June 30, 1989	
3		John Peoples	July 1, 1989	June 30, 1999	
4		Michael S. Witherell	July 1, 1999	June 30, 2005	
5		Piermaria Oddone	July 1, 2005	June 30, 2013	
interim		Jack Anderson	July 1, 2013	September 2, 2013	
6		Nigel Lockyer	September 3, 2013	April 17, 2022	
7		Lia Merminga	April 18, 2022	January 13, 2025	
interim		Young-Kee Kim	January 13, 2025	January 11, 2026	
8		Norbert Holtkamp	January 12, 2026	present	

== Accelerators ==
=== Tevatron ===
Prior to the startup in 2008 of the Large Hadron Collider (LHC) near Geneva, Switzerland, the Tevatron was the most powerful particle accelerator in the world, accelerating protons and antiprotons to energies of 980 GeV, and producing proton-antiproton collisions with energies of up to 1.96 TeV, the first accelerator to reach one "tera-electron-volt" energy. At 3.9 miles (6.3 km), it was the world's fourth-largest particle accelerator in circumference. One of its most important achievements was the 1995 discovery of the top quark, announced by research teams using the Tevatron's CDF and DØ detectors. It was shut down in 2011.

=== Fermilab Accelerator Complex ===
Since 2013, the first stage in the acceleration process (pre-accelerator injector) in the Fermilab chain of accelerators takes place in two ion sources which ionize hydrogen gas. The gas is introduced into a container lined with molybdenum electrodes, each a matchbox-sized, oval-shaped cathode and a surrounding anode, separated by 1 mm and held in place by glass ceramic insulators. A cavity magnetron generates a plasma to form the ions near the metal surface. The ions are accelerated by the source to 35 keV and matched by low energy beam transport (LEBT) into the radio-frequency quadrupole (RFQ) which applies a 750 keV electrostatic field giving the ions their second acceleration. At the exit of RFQ, the beam is matched by medium energy beam transport (MEBT) into the entrance of the linear accelerator (linac).

The next stage of acceleration is a linear particle accelerator (linac). This stage consists of two segments. The first segment has five drift tube cavities, operating at 201 MHz. The second stage has seven side-coupled cavities, operating at 805 MHz. At the end of linac, the particles are accelerated to 400 MeV, or about 70% of the speed of light. Immediately before entering the next accelerator, the H^{−} ions pass through a carbon foil, becoming H^{+} ions (protons).

The resulting protons then enter the booster ring, a 468 m (1,535 ft) circumference circular accelerator whose magnets bend beams of protons around a circular path. The protons travel around the Booster about 20,000 times in 33 milliseconds, adding energy with each revolution until they leave the Booster accelerated to 8 GeV. In 2021, the lab announced that its latest superconducting YBCO magnet could increase field strength at a rate of 290 tesla per second, reaching a peak magnetic field strength of around 0.5 tesla.

The final acceleration is applied by the Main Injector [circumference 3,319.4 m (10,890 ft)], which is the smaller of the two rings in the last picture below (foreground). Completed in 1999, it has become Fermilab's "particle switchyard" in that it can route protons to any of the experiments installed along the beam lines after accelerating them to 120 GeV. Until 2011, the Main Injector provided protons to the antiproton ring [circumference 6,283.2 m (20,614 ft)] and the Tevatron for further acceleration but now provides the last push before the particles reach the beam line experiments.

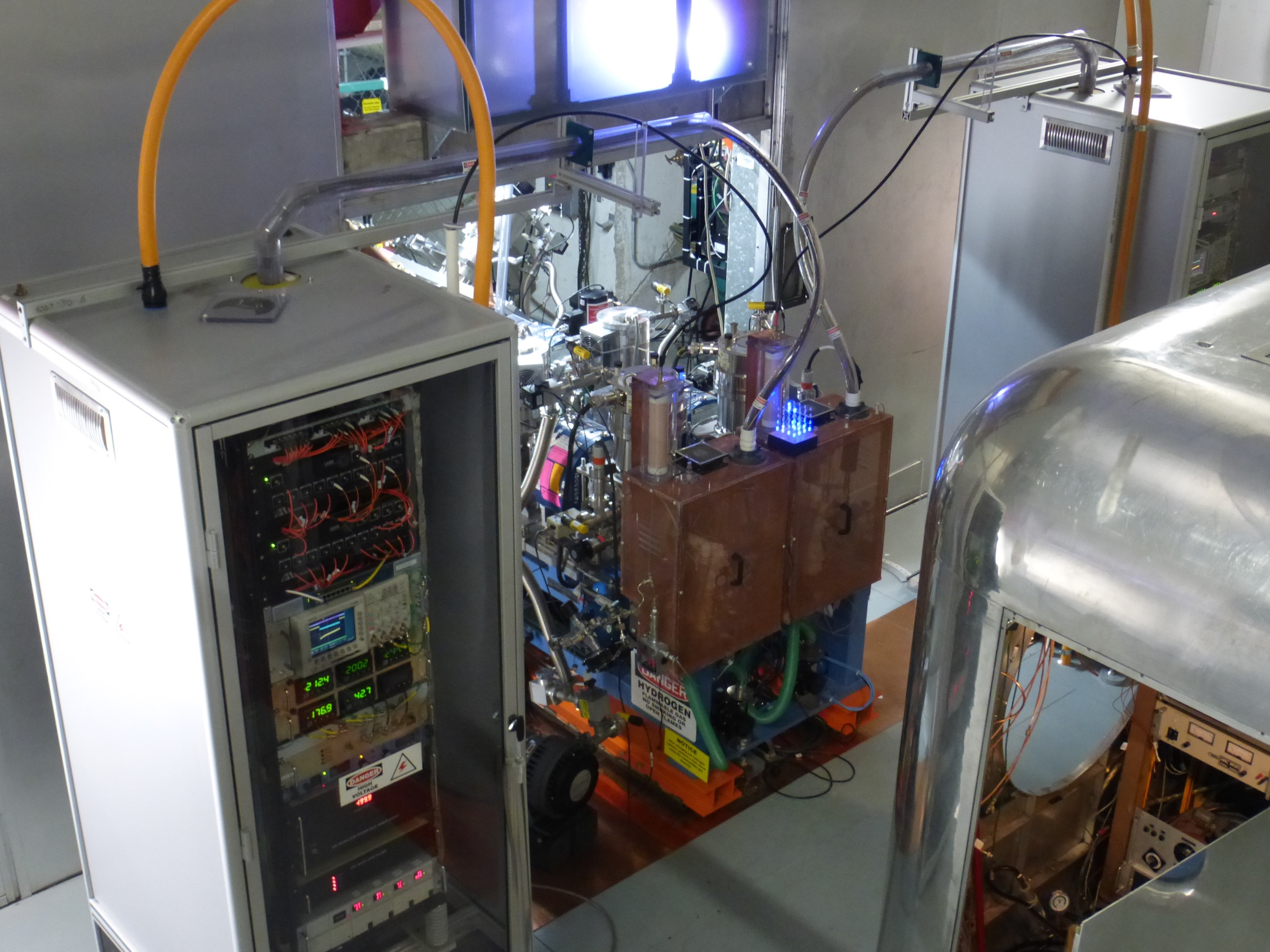
Two ion sources at the center with two high-voltage electronics cabinets next to them

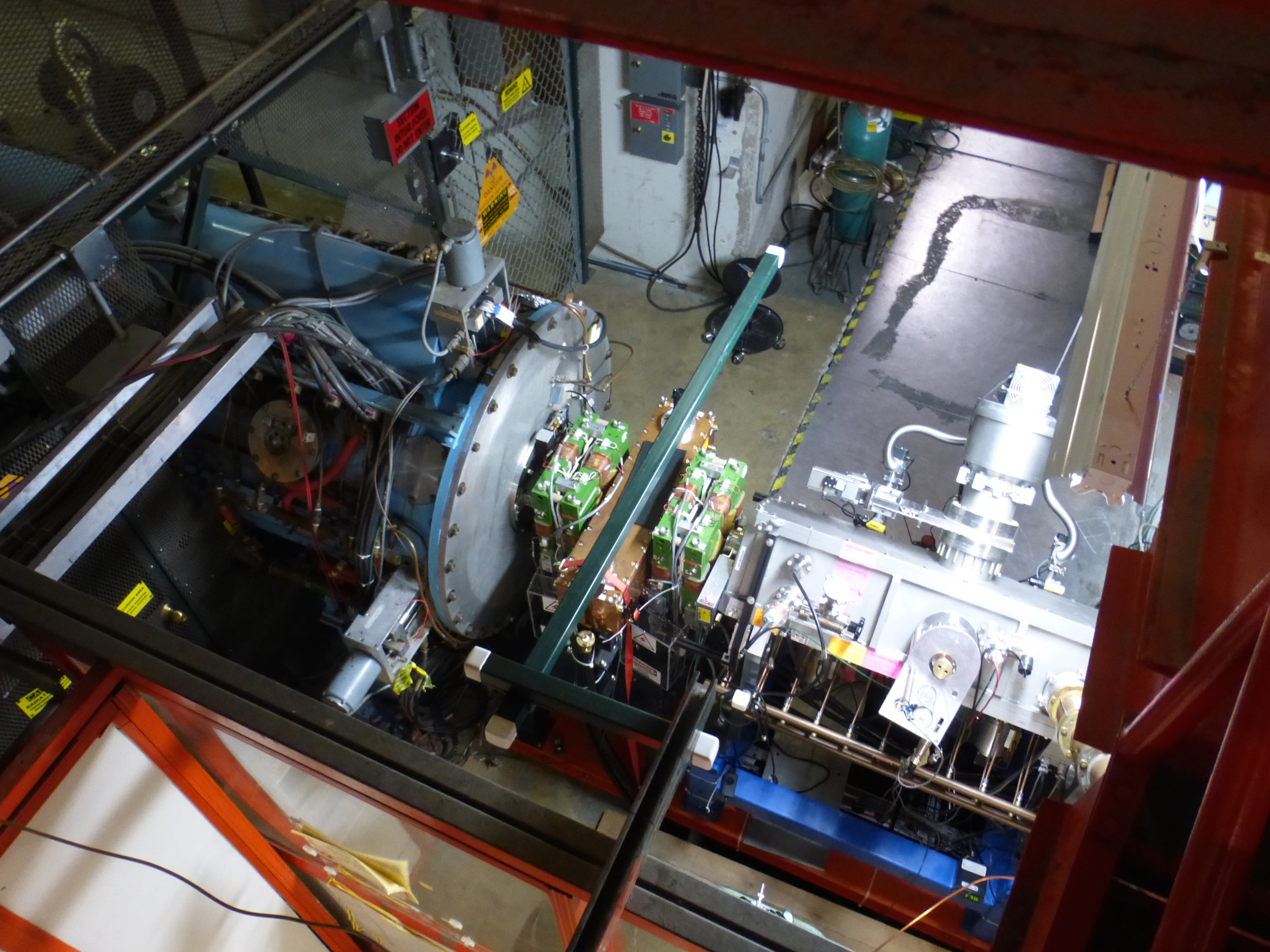
Beam direction right to left: RFQ (silver), MEBT (green), first drift tube linac (blue)

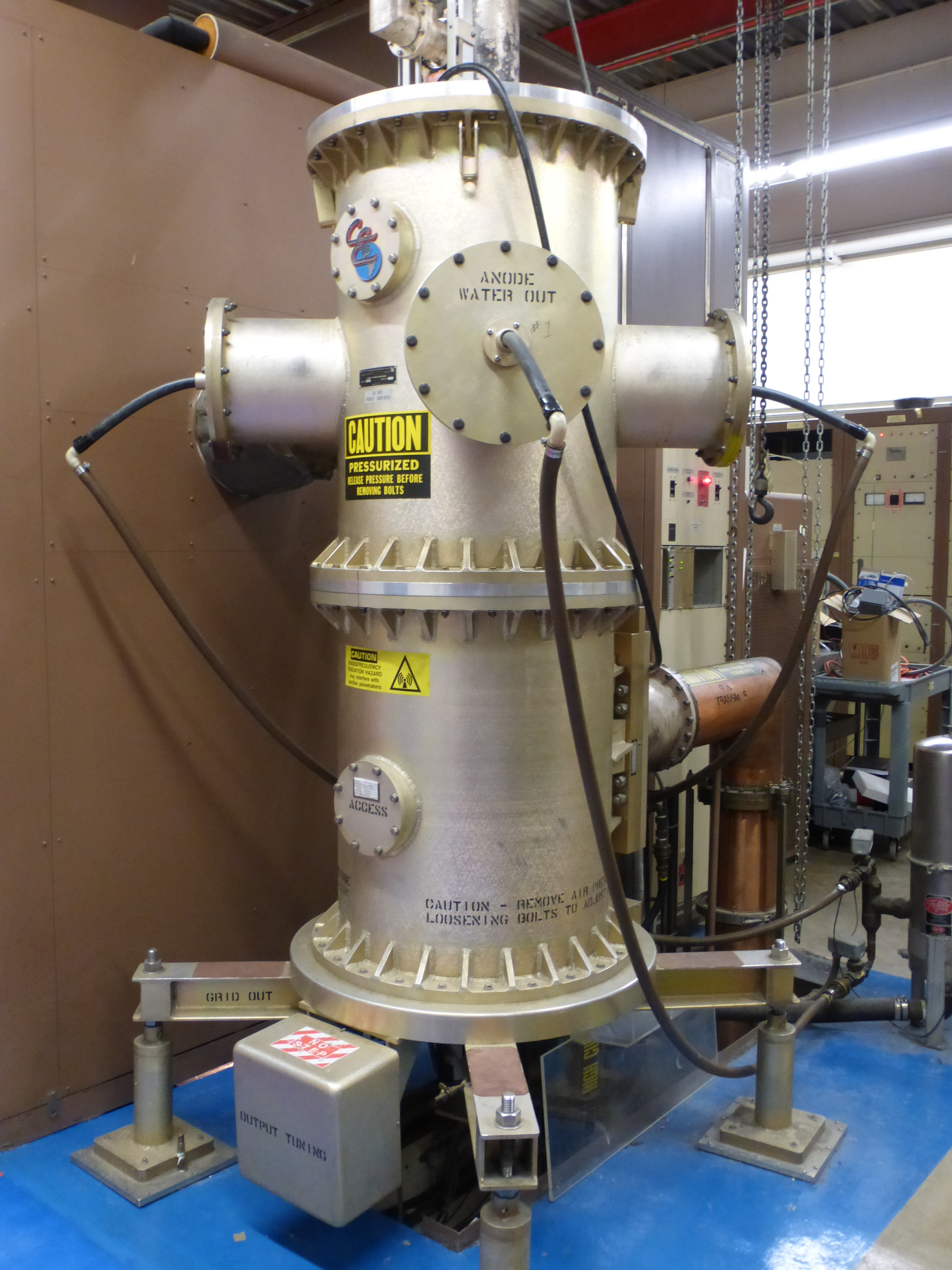
A 7835 power amplifier that is used at the first stage of linac

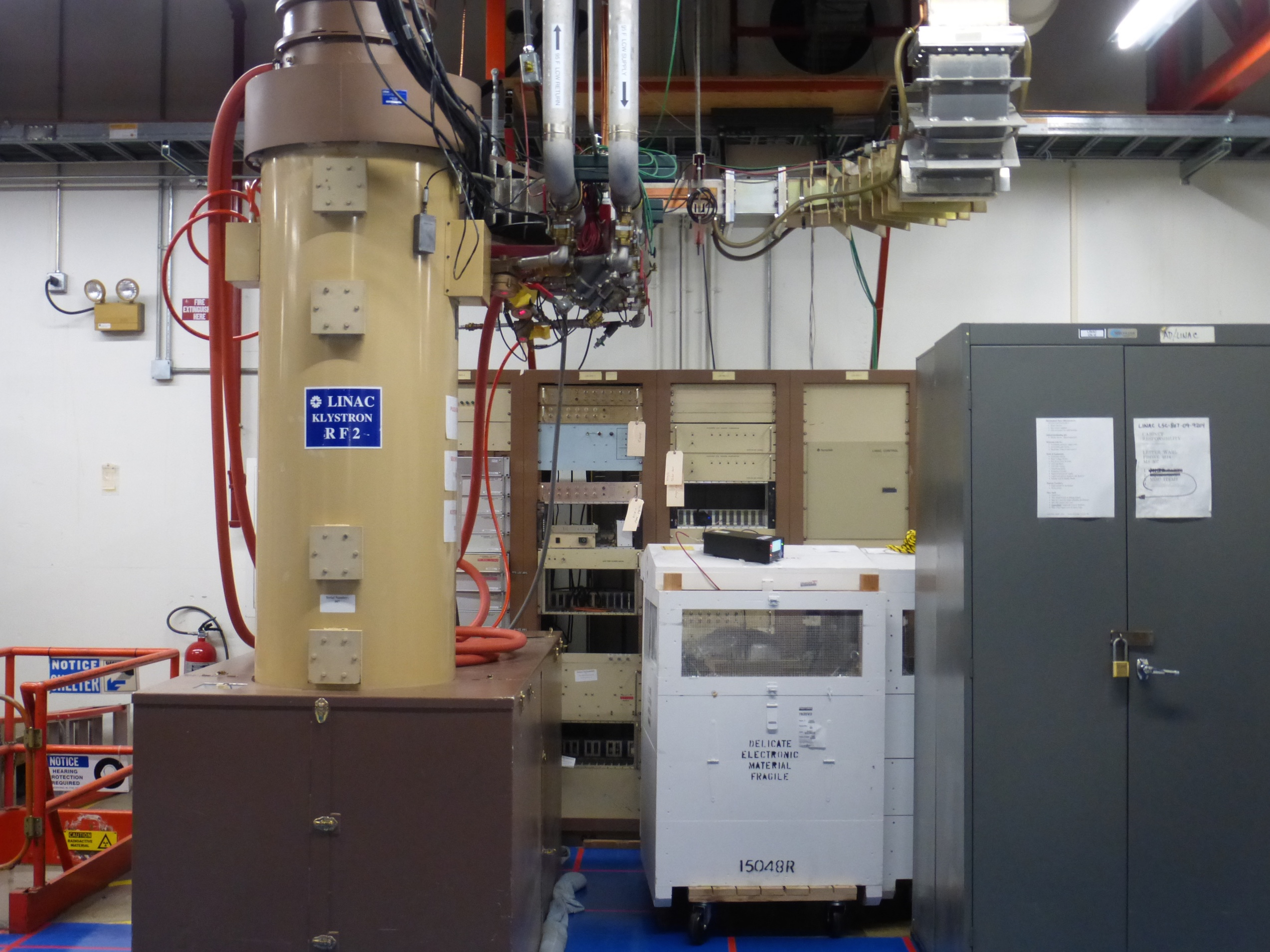
A 12 MW klystron used at the second stage of linac

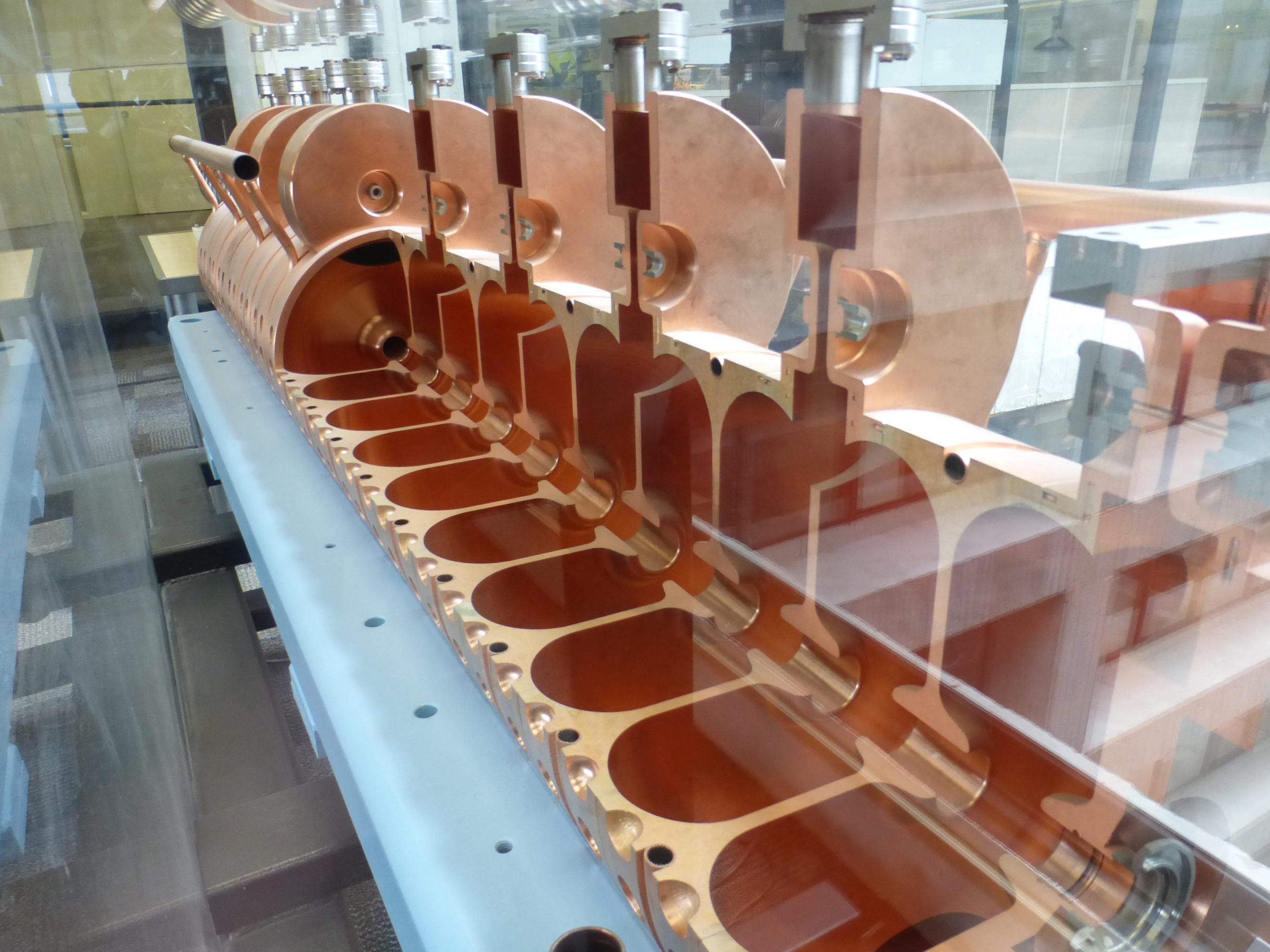
A cutaway view of the 805 MHz side-couple cavities

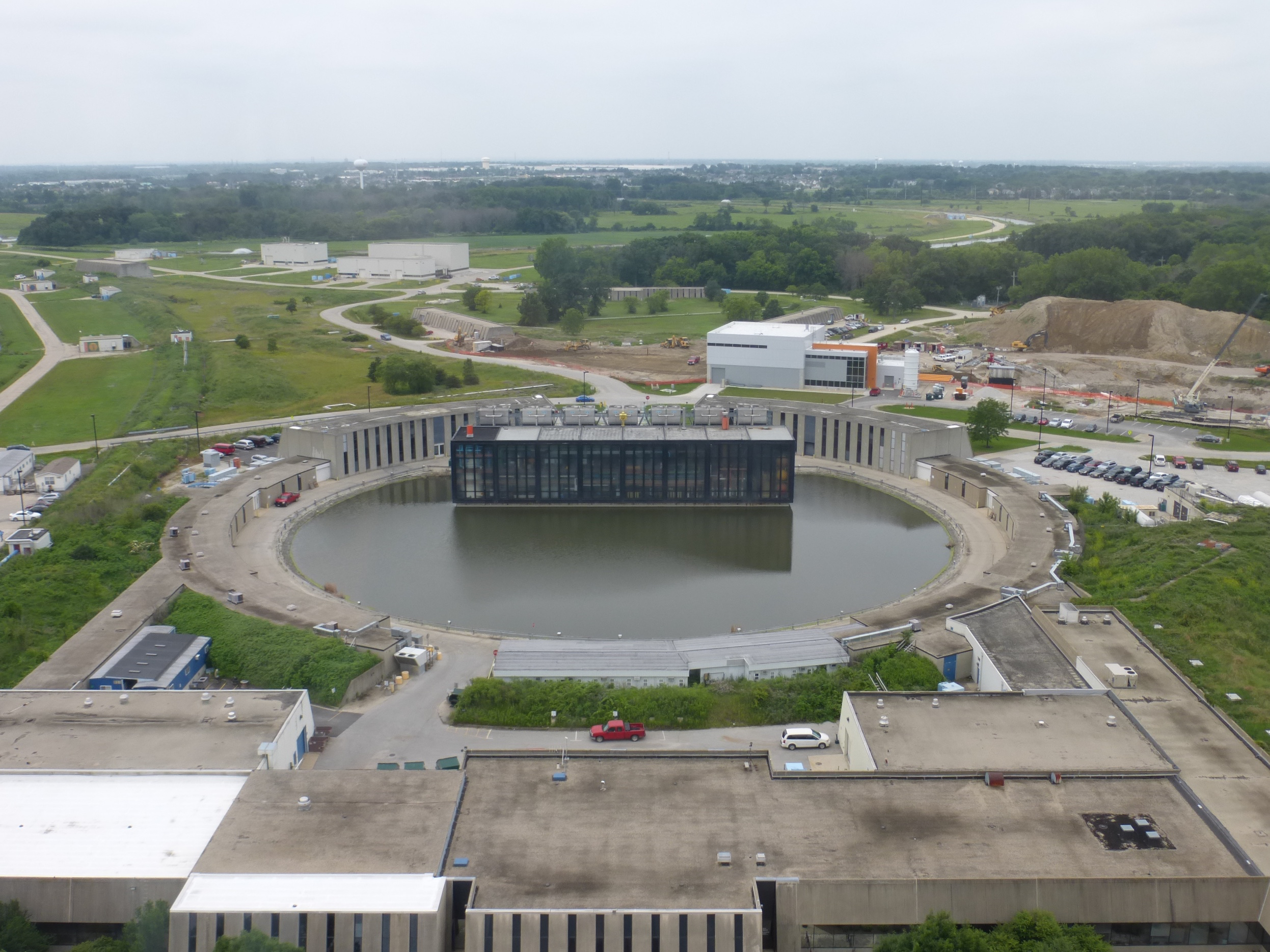
Booster ring

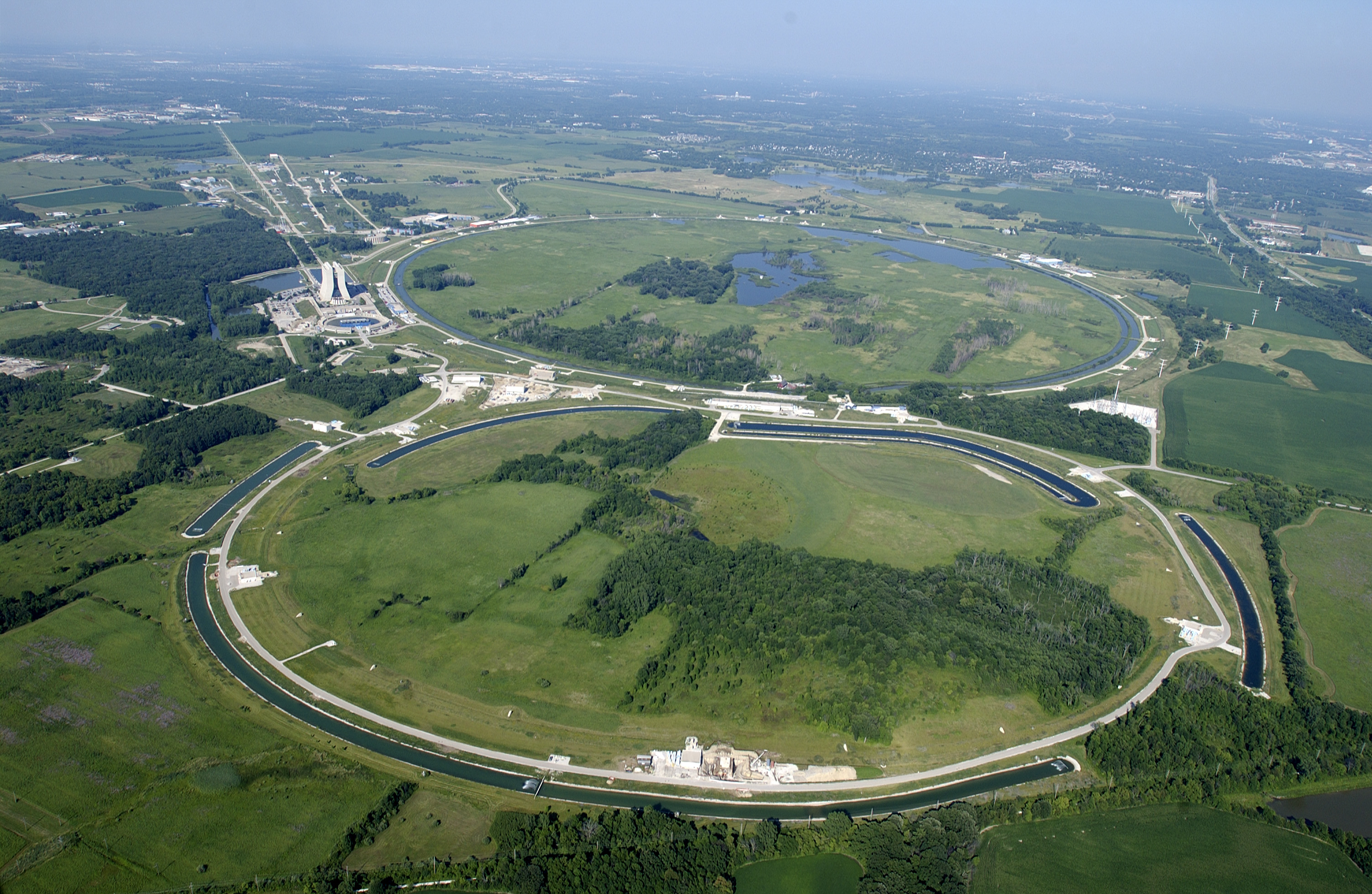
Fermilab's accelerator rings. The main injector is in the foreground, and the antiproton ring and Tevatron (inactive since 2011) are in the background.

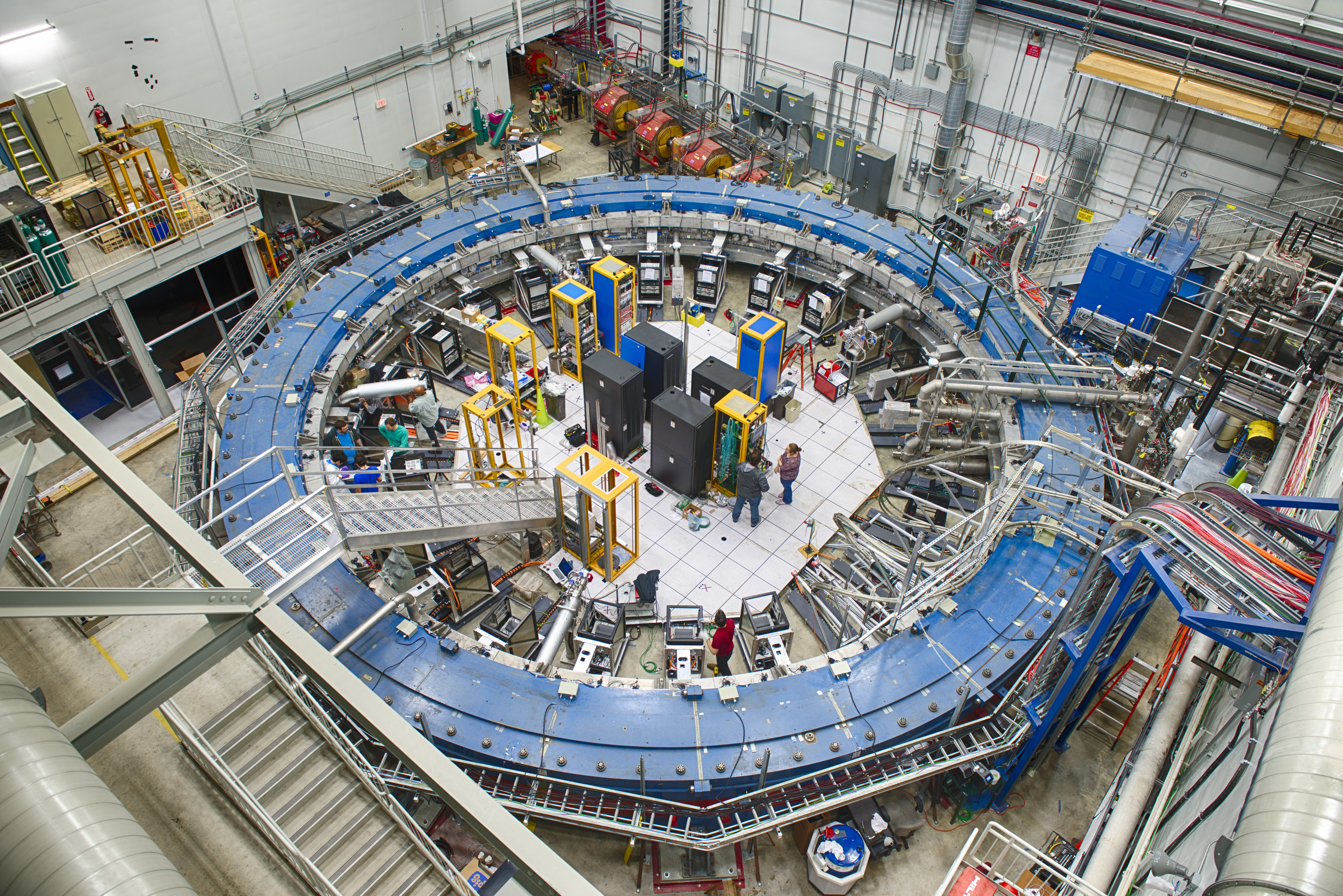
The E989 storage-ring magnet at Fermilab

=== Proton improvement plan ===
Recognizing higher demands of proton beams to support new experiments, Fermilab began to improve their accelerators in 2011. Expected to continue for many years, the project has two phases: Proton Improvement Plan (PIP) and Proton Improvement Plan-II (PIP-II).

PIP (2011–2018)

The overall goals of PIP are to increase the repetition rate of the Booster beam from 7 Hz to 15 Hz and replace old hardware to increase reliability of the operation. Before the start of the PIP project, a replacement of the pre-accelerator injector was underway. The replacement of almost 40 year-old Cockcroft–Walton generators to RFQ started in 2009 and completed in 2012. At the Linac stage, the analog beam position monitor (BPM) modules were replaced with digital boards in 2013. A replacement of Linac vacuum pumps and related hardware is expected to be completed in 2015. A study on the replacement of 201 MHz drift tubes is still ongoing. At the boosting stage, a major component of the PIP is to upgrade the Booster ring to 15 Hz operation. The Booster has 19 radio frequency stations. Originally, the Booster stations were operating without solid-state drive system which was acceptable for 7 Hz but not 15 Hz operation. A demonstration project in 2004 converted one of the stations to solid state drive before the PIP project. As part of the project, the remaining stations were converted to solid state in 2013. Another major part of the PIP project is to refurbish and replace 40 year-old Booster cavities. Many cavities have been refurbished and tested to operate at 15 Hz. The completion of cavity refurbishment is expected in 2015, after which the repetition rate can be gradually increased to 15 Hz operation. A longer term upgrade is to replace the Booster cavities with a new design. The research and development of the new cavities is underway, with replacement expected in 2018.

PIP-II

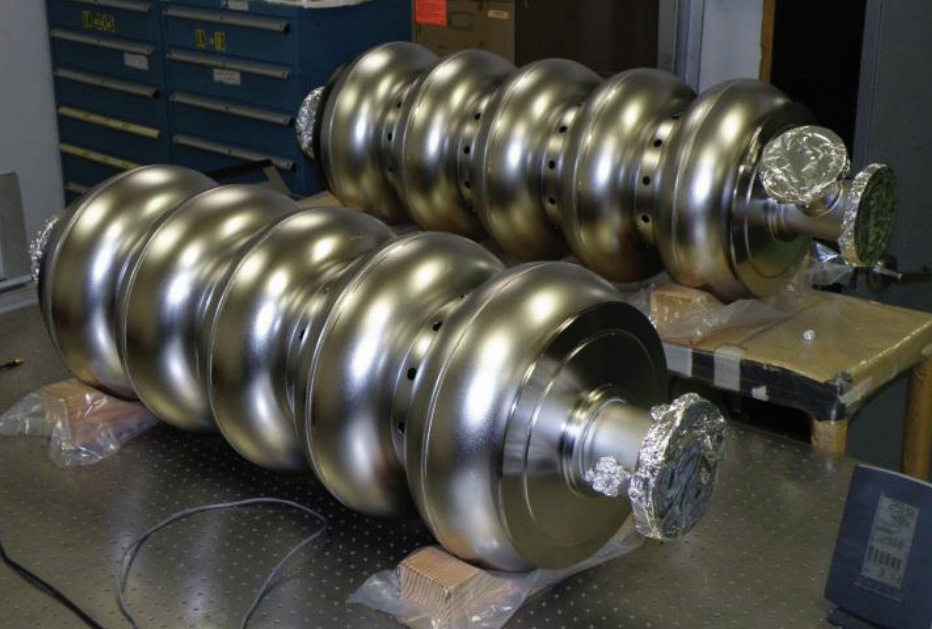
Prototypes of SRF cavities to be used in the last segment of PIP-II Linac

The goals of PIP-II include a plan to delivery 1.2 MW of proton beam power from the Main Injector to the Deep Underground Neutrino Experiment target at 120 GeV and the power near 1 MW at 60 GeV with a possibility to extend the power to 2 MW in the future. The plan should also support the current 8 GeV experiments including Mu2e, Muon g−2, and other short-baseline neutrino experiments. These require an upgrade to the Linac to inject to the Booster with 800 MeV. The first option considered was to add 400 MeV "afterburner" superconducting Linac at the tail end of the existing 400 MeV. This would have required moving the existing Linac up 50 metres (160 ft). However, there were many technical issues with this approach. Instead, Fermilab is building a new 800 MeV superconducting Linac to inject to the Booster ring.

Construction of the first building for the PIP-II accelerator began in 2020. The new Linac site will be located on top of a small portion of Tevatron near the Booster ring in order to take advantage of existing electrical and water, and cryogenic infrastructure. The PIP-II Linac will have low energy beam transport line (LEBT), radio frequency quadrupole (RFQ), and medium energy beam transport line (MEBT) operated at the room temperature at with a 162.5 MHz and energy increasing from 0.03 MeV. The first segment of Linac will be operated at 162.5 MHz and energy increased up to 11 MeV. The second segment of Linac will be operated at 325 MHz and energy increased up to 177 MeV. The last segment of linac will be operated at 650 MHz and will have the final energy level of 800 MeV.

As of 2022, the estimated PIP-II accelerator start date for the accelerator is 2028. The project was approved for construction in April 2022 with an expected cost to the Department of Energy of $978M and with an additional $330M in contributions from international partners.

== Experiments ==
=== Discoveries by Fermilab experiments ===
The following particles were first directly observed at Fermilab:

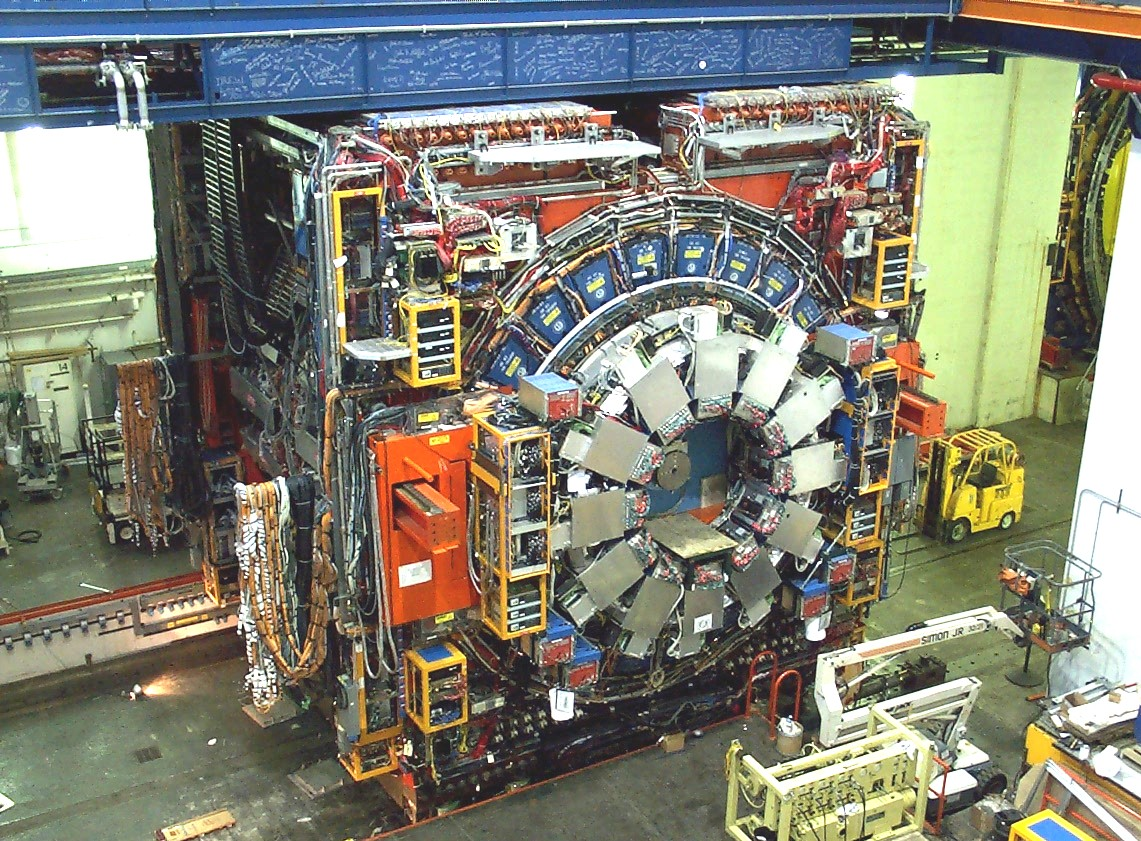
Fermilab's CDF detector

- The top quark announced in 1995 by the DØ experiment and CDF experiment.
- The bottom quark, which was observed as a quark-antiquark pair called the Upsilon meson announced in 1977 by Experiment 228.
- The tau neutrino, announced in July 2000 by the DONUT collaboration.
- The bottom Omega baryon (Ω^{−}_{b}), announced by the DØ experiment of Fermilab in 2008.

In 1999, physicists at on the KTeV experiment were also the first to observe direct CP violation in kaon decays.

The DØ experiment and CDF experiment each made important contributions to the observation of the Higgs Boson, announced in 2012.

=== Evolution of the post-Tevatron experimental program ===
Fermilab dismantled the CDF (Collider Detector at Fermilab) experiment to make the space available for IARC (Illinois Accelerator Research Center).

Fermilab physicists continue to play a key role in the world-wide collider program. The LHC Physics Center (LPC) at Fermilab is a regional center of the Compact Muon Solenoid Collaboration (the experiment is housed at CERN). The LPC offers a vibrant community of CMS scientists from the US and plays a major role in the CMS detector commissioning, and in the design and development of the detector upgrade. Fermilab is the host laboratory for USCMS, which includes researchers from 50 U.S. universities including 715 students. Fermilab hosts the largest CMS Tier 1 computing center, handling approximately 40% of global CMS Tier 1 computing requests. On February 9, 2022, Fermilab's Patricia McBride (physicist) was elected spokesperson of the CMS collaboration.

During this time-frame, the laboratory also established a new program in research in cutting-edge information science, including the development of quantum teleportation technology for the quantum internet and increasing the lifetime of superconducting resonators for use in quantum computers.

=== On-site program in the 2020s ===
The on-site program in the 2020s is largely focused on the Intensity Frontier of particle physics, especially neutrino physics and rare physics searches using muons. A program exploring nucleon structure is also continuing.

==== List of recent past, ongoing, and planned experiments running on-site ====
- ANNIE: The Accelerator Neutrino Neutron Interaction Experiment (Status, June 2023: completed run, planned future run)
- Deep Underground Neutrino Experiment (DUNE), formerly known as Long Baseline Neutrino Experiment (LBNE) (Status, June 2023: planned future run)
- ICARUS experiment: Originally located at the Laboratori Nazionali del Gran Sasso (LNGS) and moved to Fermilab. (Status, June 2023: running)
- MiniBooNE: Mini Booster Neutrino Experiment (Status, June 2023: completed run)
- MicroBooNE: Micro Booster Neutrino Experiment (Status, June 2023: completed run)
- MINERνA: Main INjector ExpeRiment with νs on As (Status, June 2023: completed run)
- Mu2e: Muon-to-Electron Conversion Experiment (Status, June 2023: planned future run)
- Muon g−2: Measurement of the anomalous magnetic dipole moment of the muon (Status, June 2023: completed run)
- NOνA: NuMI Off-axis ν_{e} Appearance (Status, June 2023: running)
- SeaQuest (Status, June 2023: completed run)
- SBND: Short-Baseline Neutrino Detector (Status, June 2023: planned future run)
- SpinQuest (Status, June 2023: planned future run)

==== LBNF/DUNE ====
Fermilab strives to become the world leader in neutrino physics through the Deep Underground Neutrino Experiment at the Long Baseline Neutrino Facility. Other leaders are CERN, which leads in Accelerator physics with the Large Hadron Collider (LHC), and Japan, which has been approved to build and lead the International Linear Collider (ILC). Fermilab will be the site of LBNF's future beamline, and the Sanford Underground Research Facility (SURF), in Lead, SD, is the site selected to house the massive far detector. The term "baseline" refers to the distance between the neutrino source and the detector. The far detector current design is for four modules of instrumented liquid argon with a fiducial volume of 10 kilotons each.

According to the 2016 Conceptual Design Report, the first two modules were expected to be complete in 2024, with the beam operational in 2026. The final modules were planned to be operational in 2027. In 2022, the cost for two far detector modules and the beam, alone, had risen to $3B. This led to a decision by the Department of Energy Office of Science to phase the experiment. Phase I would consist of two modules, to be completed in 2028–29, and the beamline, to be completed in 2032. The installation of phase II, the remaining two far detector modules, is not yet planned and will be at a cost above the $3B estimate for phase I.

A large prototype detector constructed at CERN took data with a test beam from 2018 to 2020. The results show that ProtoDUNE performed with greater than 99% efficiency.

LBNF/DUNE program in neutrino physics plans to measure fundamental physical parameters with high precision and to explore physics beyond the Standard Model. The measurements DUNE will make are expected to greatly increase the physics community's understanding of neutrinos and their role in the universe, thereby better elucidating the nature of matter and anti-matter. It will send the world's highest-intensity neutrino beam to a near detector on the Fermilab site and the far detector 800 miles (1300 km) away at SURF.

==== About other neutrino experiments ====
The MiniBooNE detector was a 40-foot (12 m) diameter sphere containing 800 tons of mineral oil lined with 1,520 phototube detectors. An estimated 1 million neutrino events were recorded each year. SciBooNE sat in the same neutrino beam as MiniBooNE but had fine-grained tracking capabilities. The NOνA experiment uses, and the MINOS experiment used, Fermilab's NuMI (Neutrinos at the Main Injector) beam, which is an intense beam of neutrinos that travels 455 miles (732 km) through the Earth to the Soudan Mine in Minnesota and the Ash River, Minnesota, site of the NOνA far detector. In 2017, the ICARUS neutrino experiment was moved from CERN to Fermilab. MicroBooNE was a LArTPC experiment that ran from 2015 to 2021, collecting data from the booster neutrino beam (BNB). The SBND experiment is the newest LArTPC neutrino experiment built by Fermilab, and serves as and important precursor to the DUNE experiment. SBND was commissioned starting early 2024 and started taking physics data in December 2024, with plans to run until early 2028.

==== Muon g−2 ====
Muon g−2: (pronounced "gee minus two") is a particle physics experiment to measure the anomaly of the magnetic moment of a muon to a precision of 0.14 ppm, which will be a sensitive test of the Standard Model.

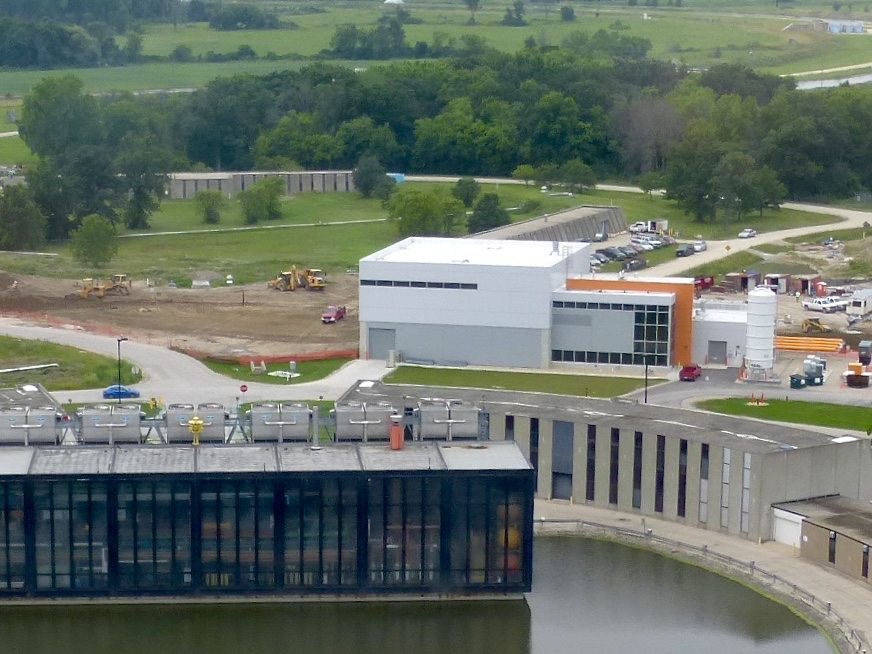
Muon g−2 building (white and orange) which hosts the magnet

Fermilab is continuing an experiment conducted at Brookhaven National Laboratory to measure the anomalous magnetic dipole moment of the muon.

The magnetic dipole moment (g) of a charged lepton (electron, muon, or tau) is very nearly 2. The difference from 2 (the "anomalous" part) depends on the lepton, and can be computed quite exactly based on the current Standard Model of particle physics. Measurements of the electron are in excellent agreement with this computation. The Brookhaven experiment did this measurement for muons, a much more technically difficult measurement due to their short lifetime, and detected a tantalizing, but not definitive, 3 σ discrepancy between the measured value and the computed one.

The Brookhaven experiment ended in 2001, but 10 years later Fermilab acquired the equipment, and is working to make a more accurate measurement (smaller σ) which will either eliminate the discrepancy or, hopefully, confirm it as an experimentally observable example of physics beyond the Standard Model.

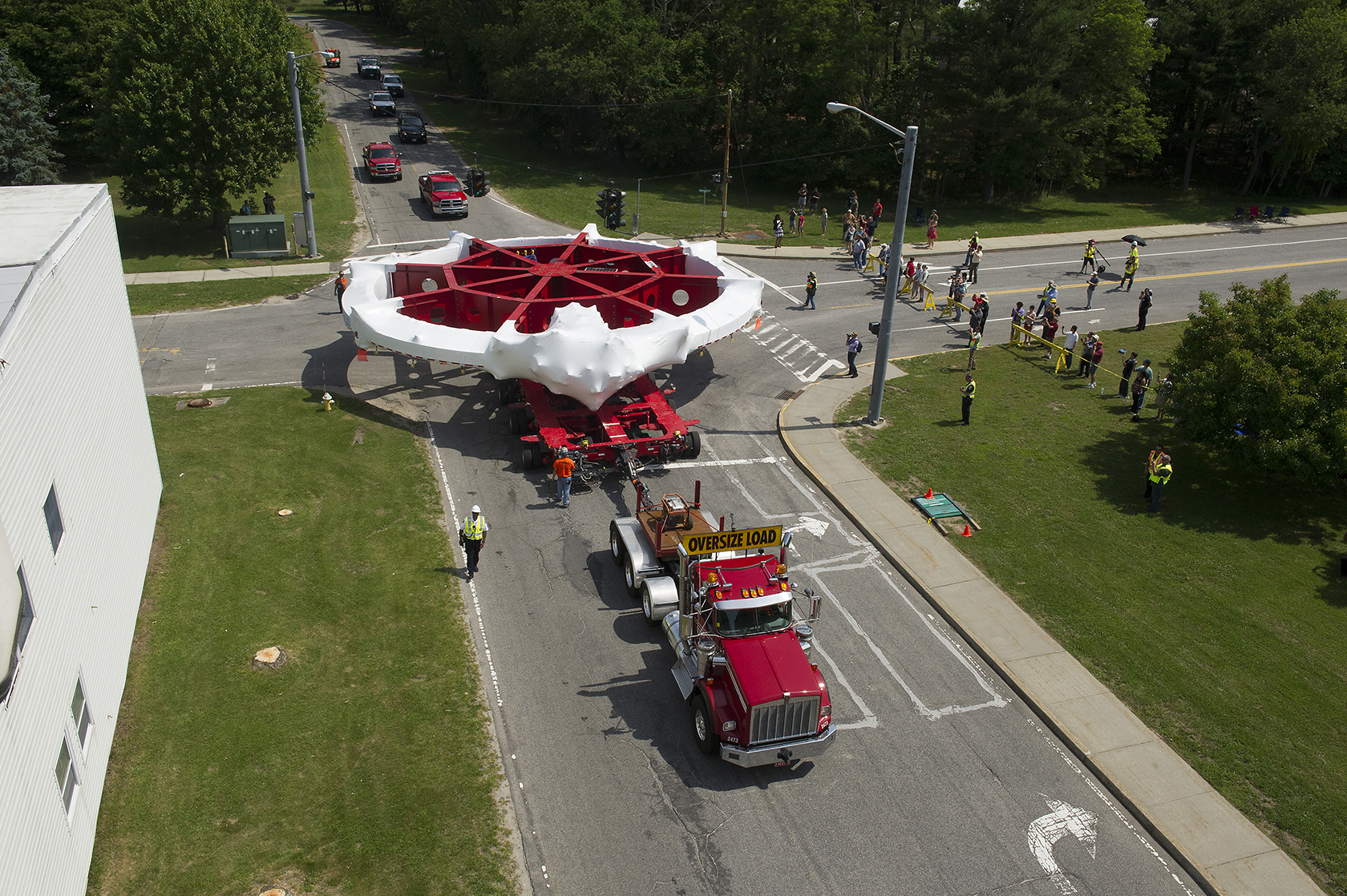
Transportation of the 600 ton magnet to Fermilab

Central to the experiment is a 50 foot-diameter superconducting magnet with an exceptionally uniform magnetic field. This was transported, in one piece, from Brookhaven in Long Island, New York, to Fermilab in the summer of 2013. The move traversed 3,200 miles over 35 days, mostly on a barge down the East Coast and up the Mississippi.

The magnet was refurbished and powered on in September 2015, and has been confirmed to have the same 1300 ppm (0.13%) p-p basic magnetic field uniformity that it had before the move.

The project worked on shimming the magnet to improve its magnetic field uniformity. This had been done at Brookhaven, but was disturbed by the move and had to be re-done at Fermilab.

In 2018, the experiment started taking data at Fermilab. In 2021, the laboratory reported that results from initial study involving the particle challenged the Standard Model, with the potential for discovery of new forces and particles.

In August 2023, the Fermilab group said they may be getting closer to proving the existence of a new force of nature. They have found more evidence that sub-atomic particles, called muons, are not behaving in the way predicted by the current theory of sub-atomic physics.

== Delays, cost overruns, safety failures, and management turmoil in the 2010s and 2020s ==
Starting in the 2010s, delays and cost over-runs led to substantial concerns about mismanagement of the laboratory.

=== Oversight issues that developed between 2014 and 2024 ===
In 2014, the Particle Physics Project Prioritization Panel ("P5") recommended three major initiatives for construction on the Fermilab site. Two were particle physics experiments: the Deep Underground Neutrino Experiment and Mu2e. The third was the PIPII accelerator upgrade described above. P5 also recommended Fermilab participation in LHC at CERN.

As of 2022, two P5-recommended Fermilab projects had suffered substantial delays:

- The Deep Underground Neutrino Experiment with the enabling Long Baseline Neutrino Facility was proposed to P5 as a $1B project; the cost estimate in 2021 dollars was more than $3B, with far detector operations beginning 2029 and full operation by 2032.
- The Mu2e experiment was to produce preliminary results in 2020, but this is now delayed until 2026.

Even smaller experiments, below the cost-level of individual P5 approval, that were proposed at the time of the 2014 P5 suffered considerable delay. The Short-Baseline Near Detector (SBND) that was proposed in 2014 with a $10M cost scale was originally scheduled for data taking in spring 2018, but is now scheduled to begin in autumn 2023.

The Department of Energy raised flags as early as Fiscal Year (FY) 2019. Each year, the US Department of Energy Office of Science reviews and grades the national laboratories in its portfolio on eight performance metrics. Fermilab has received the lowest grades among the national laboratories in FY2019, 2020, 2021 and 2022. A rare C grade was assigned for project management in 2021, reflective of the delays and cost overruns. In an article in the journal Science, James Decker, who was principal deputy director of DOE's Office of Science from 1973 to 2007, stated that the performance evaluation for 2021 was "one of the most scathing I have seen".

In 2020, the high-energy physics community expressed concern that the cost of major projects at Fermilab have led to diversion of funds from the high-energy physics core research program, harming the health of the field. Congress increased the annual HEP budget from less than $800 million by about $250M to more than $1 billion—a 30% increase that went mainly to support large projects at Fermilab.

The Fermilab project delays led to substantial change in leadership in 2022. In September 2021, Nigel Lockyer, Director of Fermilab, resigned. Lockyer was replaced by Lia Merminga, head of the PIP II project. On March 31, 2022, James Siegrist, associate director for High Energy Physics in the Department of Energy Office of Science, who had overseen the response to the P5 report, stepped down. In September 2022, it was announced that deputy director for Research Joseph Lykken would step down, to be replaced by Yale Professor Bonnie Fleming, who previously served as Deputy Chief Research Officer for the neutrino program at Fermilab. Regina (Gina) Rameika joined the DOE's Office of Science as the associate director for the Office of High Energy Physics in his place on November 7, 2022, moving from her role as spokesperson of the DUNE Experiment.

Although these replacements represent a substantial turn-over of the top ranks, the new management was drawn from the 2014-2022 management team and Fermilab has continued to suffer turmoil since this change-over. In particular, new issues arose with regard to safety and access of employees, visitors and contractors.

On May 25, 2023, a contractor fell 23 ft while attempting to secure reinforcing bars on a wall for the new PIP II project site. The contractor was air-lifted to hospital in an accident considered the worst on site in decades. A DOE-appointed Accident Investigation Board concluded that the incident was preventable and "recommended a long list of managerial and safety controls needed to prevent a recurrence of such an accident." As a result of the accident, the $1B PIP II project that is crucial for the success of the DUNE Experiment was delayed.

On September 1, 2023, Chief Research Officer Bonnie Fleming announced that the Fermilab accelerator system was temporarily shut down for safety reasons. On September 9, 2022, DOE issued order DOE O 420.2D entitled "Safety of Accelerators". This document establishes the accelerator-specific safety requirements for DOE-funded accelerators and their operations. While other national labs continued operations while working to bring their safety requirements into compliance, Fermilab chose to suspend operations until the lab was fully compliant with the new order. The Fermilab Main Accelerator resumed running after the DOE O 420.2D implementation was complete, in late spring, 2024.

In mid-2024, Fermilab faced a budget shortfall. This resulted in an initial furlough of employees and closure of its operations and public access for one week in August. The need for a furlough was surprising since the budget grew "a hefty 7.6% to $739 million" in fiscal year (FY) 2024. According to the journal Science, the crisis stemmed from poorly managed growth: "from 2022 to 2023 alone, [laboratory staff] grew by 176 members, or 9%, to 2160." The furlough did not fully address the budget deficit, and in November, 2.5% of the workforce was laid off. Despite this, Tracy Marc, head of Fermilab's media services, told WTTW News that "the overall financial health of the laboratory remains intact and is being managed".

=== 2024 Whistleblower Report ===
On July 15, 2024, a report containing allegations of cover-ups at the laboratory was uploaded to the arXiv physics preprint server. The allegations, which were also reported in the press, included:

- "The alleged sexual assault of the NOvA and DUNE collaborator who filed and won her 2022 lawsuit in the UK [after it] was dismissed by FNAL staff."
- "A cover-up of a case of guns on site in 2023, with promotion of the perpetrator and pretextuous firing of the witness."
- "A cover-up of an attempt at badly hurting with an industrial vehicle a female electrician by a ... male employee."
- "A cover-up of Beryllium windows blasting, with subsequent promotion of the person in charge."
- "A hostile work environment, where constructive criticism is most often ignored and retaliated against."

The report also recounted a litany of complaints concerning day-to-day running of the laboratory that have been reported in this article, above, as well as a new claim of "PIP-II contingency overruns within one year from CD3 approval" that could potentially impact the LBNF/DUNE program.

For credibility, the report provided detailed eye-witness accounts to support the allegations. Beyond that, some information was previously publicly reported. For example, the first allegation concerning an egregious case of sexual harassment was reported in The Guardian and the fact that the claimant had submitted a complaint to Fermilab which took no action appeared in court documents. Scientists expressed fear of retribution by Fermilab leadership. In order for the whistleblowers to remain anonymous, the report was uploaded to the arXiv preprint server by Giorgio Bellettini, a respected leader in the field of particle physics who served as spokesman of the collaboration for the Collider Detector at Fermilab twice. A second signed letter of support from William Barletta of the Massachusetts Institute of Technology was also included.

The report was delivered to the deputy director for Operations of the DOE Office of Science Dr. Juston Fontaine and the DOE Under Secretary for Science and Innovation Geraldine Richmond in June 2024. It was released to the public one month later, after DOE officials did not respond. On July 29, 2024, Fermilab Director Lia Merminga issued a terse response to concerned scientists, saying: "The [whistleblower] document asserts various challenges at Fermilab, some of which are inaccurate, and others of which [the Fermi Research Alliance] has been working hard to address for some time." At an All Hands Meeting, Merminga allegedly also told scientific staff to "stop whining."

=== The shift to new management by the Fermi Forward Discovery Group, LLC, 2023-2025 ===
In view of the many issues facing the laboratory, in January 2023, the DOE announced a two-year process to rebid the contract for the management of the laboratory due to the performance issues. The DOE announcement of the competition explained: "the purpose of this contract competition is to solicit and award a new M&O contract that will result in improved contractor performance and efficiencies at FNAL. DOE expects that this competition will elicit new and innovative approaches for planning the Laboratory's future." At an informational meeting for potential bidders on March 1, 2023, the presentation slides expanded upon issues under "Major Challenges/Risks" including highlighting the concern: "The Laboratory continues to have challenges in Financial Management and Acquisition Management. Audits repeatedly highlight the same deficiencies and control failures year after year. Any corrective actions implemented have resulted in little to no progress. Significant procurement issues have hindered the laboratory's ability to successfully deliver efficient and effective business systems/resources to enable the Science Mission. Substantial concerns remain regarding the ability to expend Government funds in an effective, efficient, and compliant manner." The myriad issues facing a new contractor were listed in January 2024 in the news section of the journal Nature.

On October 1, 2024, the Department of Energy awarded the contract to operate Fermi National Accelerator to the newly-formed Fermi Forward Discovery Group, LLC (FFDG). The FFDG represents an incremental change in management from the previous decade because the group includes the past management team for the laboratory, the FRA, that consisted of the University of Chicago and the Universities Research Association (URA). There are two additions: Amentum Environment & Energy, Inc., which specializes in advanced engineering, and Longenecker & Associates, which specializes in project management. Thus, the selection left the scientific and human resources management unchanged, but did strengthen expertise to deliver large projects.

The FFDG assumed management of Fermilab operations on January 1, 2025, with a five-year contract. On January 13, 2025, Director Lia Merminga resigned. No reason was provided, however reporters from the American Institute of Physics (AIP) hypothesized the final straw was the failing 2024 "report card" from the Department of Energy publicly released just as the FFDG assumed management. The AIP reported: "[In 2024,] the Department of Energy gave the lab its lowest marks since the current lab appraisal process began in 2006. The lab failed to meet expectations in five out of eight categories, including two C+ grades in program management and contractor leadership and a C in business systems. (The DOE Office of Science defines a B+ grade and above as meeting expectations.)"

Young-Kee Kim, Albert A. Michelson Distinguished Service Professor of Physics at the University of Chicago, served as Acting Director, during the search for a replacement. Kim previously served as Deputy Director of Fermilab from 2006 to 2013. During her brief period of leadership, along with addressing the management challenges described above, Kim oversaw a 10% reduction of laboratory staff due to severely reduced science budgets in the first year of the Trump administration. Nevertheless, she had successes, including authoring a report published by the National Academy of Sciences calling for a muon collider at Fermilab, as well as incrementally improving the grades given to the laboratory by the Department of Energy during her term, with no C's reported in 2025.

On January 12, 2026, Kim stepped down and the new Director, Norbert Holtkamp, took over the leadership reins.

== Site ==
=== Access ===
Fermi National Accelerator Laboratory (aka Fermilab) was founded in 1967 as an open science research laboratory, and, to this day, does not conduct classified research. The initial plans called for Fermilab to employ a guard force "...to control movement of personnel onto the site when tests are being conducted" as noted in the December 1971 Environmental Statement and "..to enforce the site boundary". Early leadership moved toward greater public openness allowing for ease of scientific collaboration and public enjoyment to include the relocated bison herd.

In the late 2010s and early 2020s, the management of Fermilab began to introduce severe restrictions on access to the Fermilab site by the public and by scientists. By spring 2023, the restrictions had become so onerous that more than 2500 physicists and visitors to the laboratory signed an "open petition to elected representatives to reopen Fermilab." The petition stated that: "The access policy changes undermine critical aspects of the scientific process as well as the basic functioning of Fermilab. Hosting research meetings, interviewing prospective employees, collaborating with scientists outside the lab, and enacting our famously impactful education programs have all been hindered." With respect to the general public, the petition stated: "Today, the general public is only permitted to access the main road, and with ID requirements that are becoming increasingly stringent, soon its doors will be closed to tourists and even to some immigrants. We can no longer drive or bike around the premises freely. The dog park, Wilson Hall with its exhibits on the top floor, and other areas are no longer generally accessible. Fishing and other activities open to the public have been canceled." The petition emphatically requested that access policies be reverted to the open laboratory model that governed the laboratory prior to 2020.

In May 2023, Director Lia Merminga posted a response to the petition on the Fermilab website, noting that some areas on site remain open to the public during specific hours with ID access requirements. Merminga's response justifies the new restrictions because the lab "manage[s] a large amount of non-public information"---reasoning that conflicts with the petition that points out that the lab is fully tax-payer funded, does no classified research, and has a government mandate to publish all of its scientific results. Further coverage of the petition and the management response appeared in the magazines Physics Today and Physics World.

In keeping with Real ID requirements for DOE facilities, all unescorted adult visitors entering the site must present a government-issued photo ID compliant with the Real ID Act. Up-to-date specifics about access can be found on the Fermilab website.

=== Architecture ===
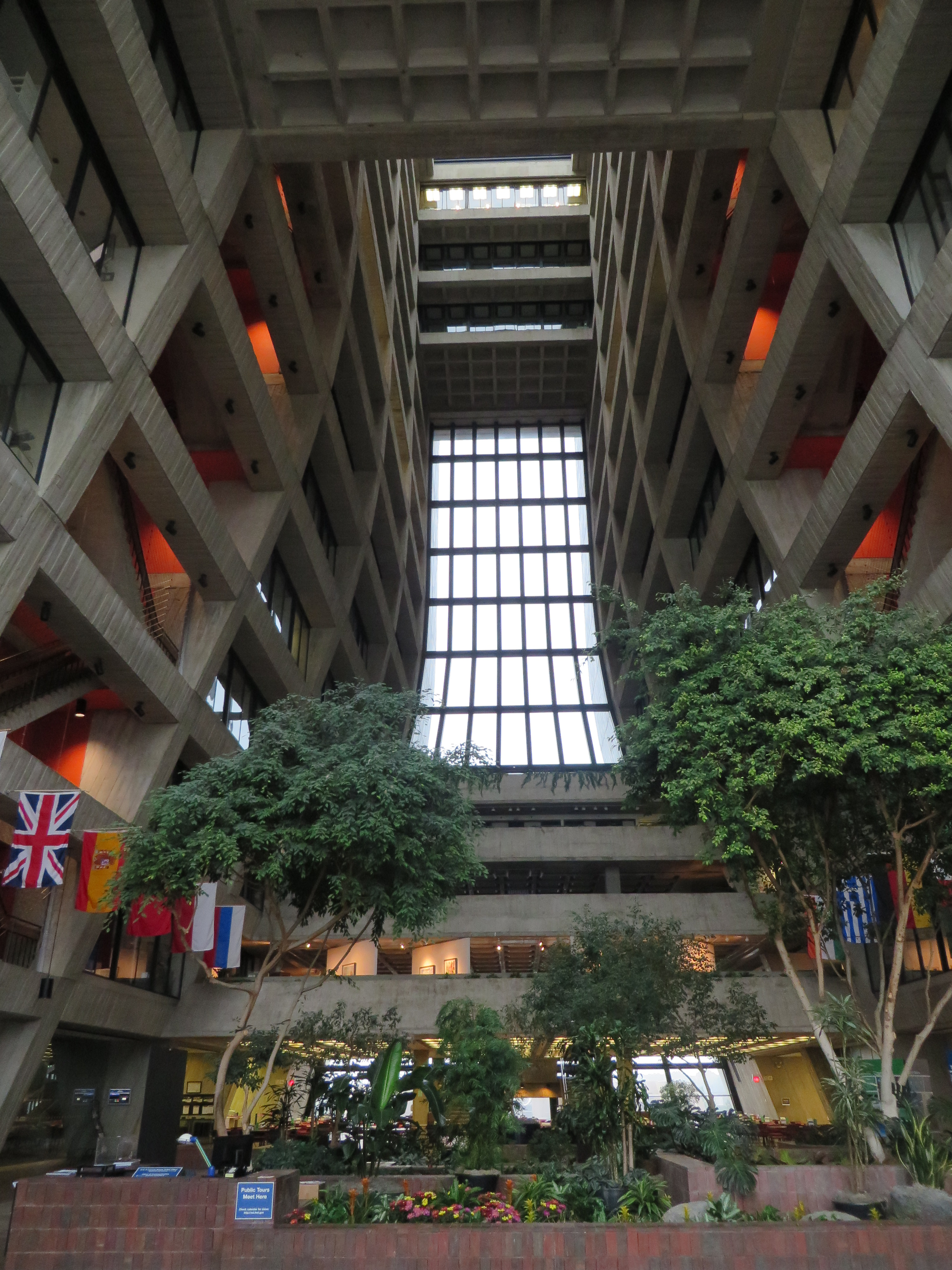
Interior of Wilson Hall

Fermilab's first director, Robert Wilson, insisted that the site's aesthetic complexion not be marred by a collection of concrete block buildings. The design of the administrative building (Wilson Hall) was inspired by St. Pierre's Cathedral in Beauvais, France, though it was realized in a Brutalist style. Several of the buildings and sculptures within the Fermilab reservation represent various mathematical constructs as part of their structure.

The Archimedean Spiral is the defining shape of several pumping stations as well as the building housing the MINOS experiment. The reflecting pond at Wilson Hall also showcases a 32-foot-tall (9.8 m) hyperbolic obelisk, designed by Wilson. Some of the high-voltage transmission lines carrying power through the laboratory's land are built to echo the Greek letter π. One can also find structural examples of the DNA double-helix spiral and a nod to the geodesic sphere.

Wilson's sculptures on the site include Tractricious, a free-standing arrangement of steel tubes near the Industrial Complex constructed from parts and materials recycled from the Tevatron collider, and the soaring Broken Symmetry, which greets those entering the campus via the Pine Street entrance. Crowning the Ramsey Auditorium is a representation of the Möbius strip with a diameter of more than 8 feet (2.4 m). Also scattered about the access roads and village are a massive hydraulic press and old magnetic containment channels, all painted blue.

=== Wildlife ===
In 1967, Wilson brought five American bison to the site, a bull and four cows, and an additional 21 were provided by the Illinois Department of Conservation. Some fearful locals believed at first that the bison were introduced in order to serve as an alarm if and when radiation at the laboratory reached dangerous levels, but they were assured by Fermilab that this claim had no merit. Today, the Fermilab bison herd is a popular attraction that draws many visitors and the grounds are also a sanctuary for other local wildlife populations. A Christmas Bird Count has occurred at the lab every year since 1976.

Working with the Forest Preserve District of DuPage County, Fermilab has introduced American barn owls to selected structures around the grounds.

=== Tritium on site ===
During running, particle beams produce tritium, an isotope of hydrogen consisting of a proton and two neutrons that is weakly radioactive with a half-life of 12.3 years. This can bind with oxygen to form tritiated water. Tritium levels measured on site are low compared to federal health and environmental standards. Fermilab monitors tritium leaving the site in surface and sewer water, and provides an FAQ sheet for those who want to learn more.

At an informational meeting for potential bidders for the management contract, held on March 1, 2023, the presentation slides indicated that although the rate of tritium leaving site is below the required standards, there is sufficient tritium contamination on site to represent a "challenge". In particular, tritium produced in the NuMI beamline that sends neutrinos to experiments in Minnesota has been pumped into the industrial water cooling system that is used for equipment across the Fermilab campus. As a result, it is concluded that now "tritium contamination is largely throughout the research complex."

== See also ==
- Asteroid 11998 Fermilab, named in honor of the laboratory
- Big Science
- Center for the Advancement of Science in Space — operates the US National Laboratory on the ISS
- CERN
- Fermi Linux LTS
- Scientific Linux
- Stanford Linear Accelerator Center
- Felicia (ferret), a ferret used by Fermilab in the 1970s
