= Fermi Linux =

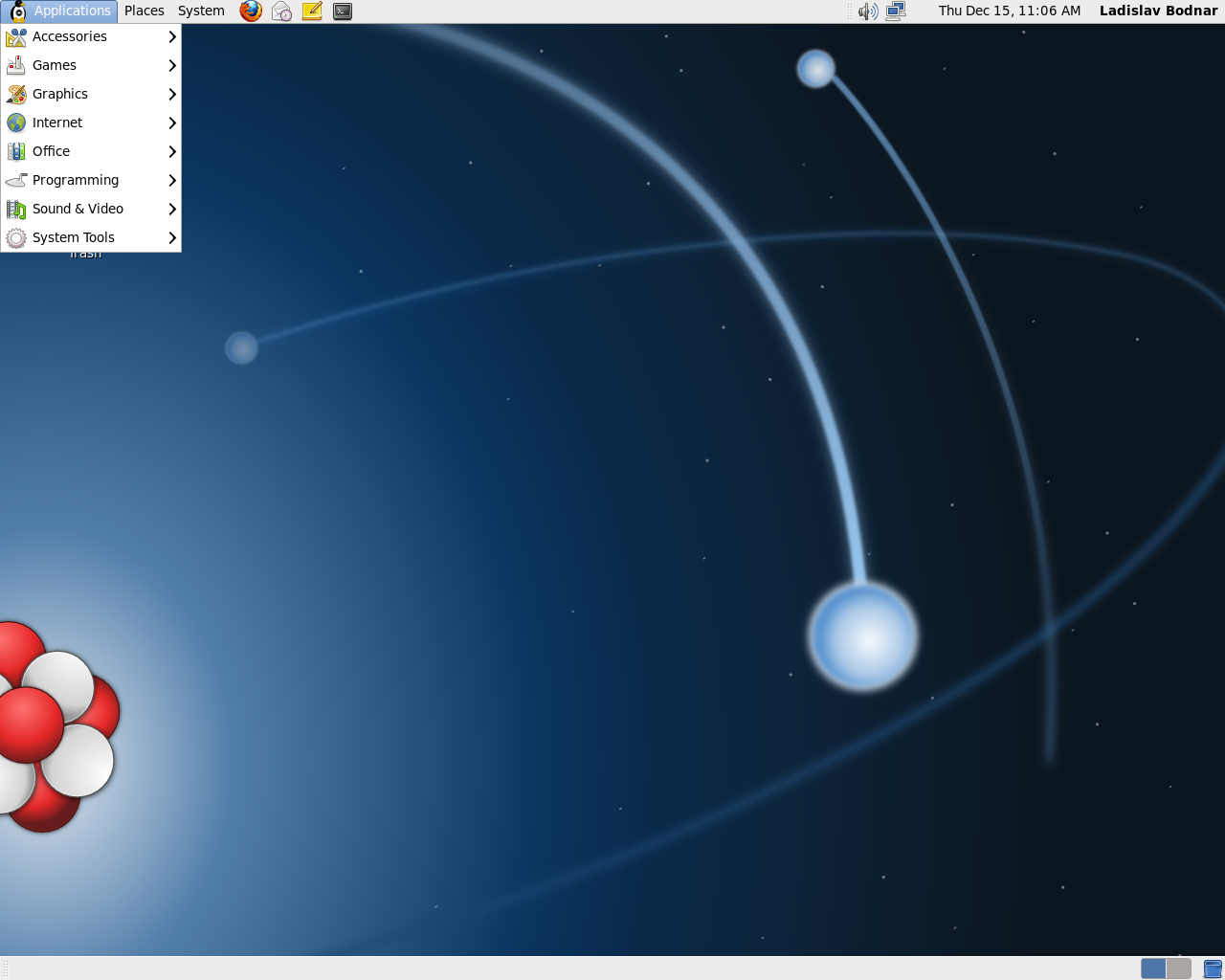
- Developer: Fermilab
- OS family: Linux (Unix-like)
- Working state: Discontinued
- Source model: Open source and closed source
- Initial release: 31 August 1998; 27 years ago
- Latest release: 6.7 / October 18, 2015; 10 years ago
- Package manager: RPM
- Supported platforms: IA-32, x86-64
- Kernel type: Monolithic (Linux)
- Default user interface: GNOME 2, KDE, IceWM
- License: Mainly GPL
- Official website: www.scientificlinux.org/at-fermilab/

Fermi Linux is the generic name for Linux distributions that are created and used at Fermi National Accelerator Laboratory (Fermilab). These releases have gone under different names: Fermi Linux, Fermi Linux LTS, LTS, Fermi Linux STS, STS, Scientific Linux Fermi, SLF. For the purposes of this entry they can be used interchangeably to designate a version of Linux specific to Fermilab.

At the current time, the only officially supported Fermi Linux is Scientific Linux Fermi, which is based on Scientific Linux.

== History ==
Fermi Linux started out as an extension of the PC Farms Pilot Project spearheaded by Connie Sieh. A Fermilab initiative to seek out cost effective computing for the Tevatron. Continuing to update the SGI and AIX hardware for the computing needs of that experiment was very expensive.

Initial builds of Fermi Linux were merely Red Hat Linux with some things turned off or some extra packages added. With the release of Scientific Linux, Fermi Linux became a 'site' specific build of Scientific Linux.

=== Releases ===
Fermi Linux
month-date year	Number (Official)	Name
August 31, 1998	Fermi Linux 5.0.2	n/a
August 16, 1999	Fermi Linux 5.2.1	Charm
April 7, 2000	Fermi Linux 6.1.1	Strange
August 29, 2001	Fermi Linux 7.1.1	Top
September 13, 2002	Fermi Linux 7.3.1	Bottom
April 7, 2003	Fermi Linux 9.0.1	Up
August 27, 2003	Fermi Linux 7.1.2	Top
January 26, 2004	Fermi Linux LTS 3.0.1	Feynman
February 27, 2004	Fermi Linux 7.3.2	Bottom
October 1, 2004	Scientific Linux Fermi LTS 3.0.3	Feynman
February 22, 2005	Scientific Linux Fermi LTS 3.0.4	Feynman
August 29, 2005	Scientific Linux Fermi LTS 3.0.5	Feynman
September 20, 2005	Scientific Linux Fermi LTS 4.1	Wilson
January 25, 2006	Scientific Linux Fermi LTS 4.2	Wilson
October 25, 2006	Scientific Linux Fermi LTS 4.4	Wilson
November 10, 2006	Scientific Linux Fermi LTS 3.0.8	Feynman
May 19, 2007	Scientific Linux Fermi STS 6	N/A
September 10, 2007	Scientific Linux Fermi 5.0	Lederman
October 25, 2007	Scientific Linux Fermi LTS 3.0.9	Feynman
August 20, 2007	Scientific Linux Fermi LTS 4.5	Wilson
February 21, 2008	Scientific Linux Fermi 5.1	Lederman
March 24, 2008	Scientific Linux Fermi LTS 4.6	Wilson
July 17, 2008	Scientific Linux Fermi 5.2	Lederman
September 18, 2008	Scientific Linux Fermi LTS 4.7	Wilson
April 1, 2009	Scientific Linux Fermi 5.3	Lederman
October 6, 2009	Scientific Linux Fermi STS 10	N/A
November 18, 2009	Scientific Linux Fermi STS 11	N/A
January 7, 2010	Scientific Linux Fermi LTS 4.8	Wilson
February 8, 2010	Scientific Linux Fermi 5.4	Lederman
May 20, 2010	Scientific Linux Fermi STS 12	N/A
June 18, 2010	Scientific Linux Fermi 5.5	Lederman
August 23, 2010	Scientific Linux Fermi STS 13	N/A
December 22, 2010	Scientific Linux Fermi STS 14	N/A
November 22, 2011	Scientific Linux Fermi LTS 4.9	Wilson
November 23, 2011	Scientific Linux Fermi 5.7	Lederman
December 14, 2011	Scientific Linux Fermi 6.1	Ramsey
May 7, 2012	Scientific Linux Fermi 6.2	Ramsey
June 11, 2012	Scientific Linux Fermi 5.8	Lederman
August 22, 2012	Scientific Linux Fermi 6.3	Ramsey
March 7, 2013	Scientific Linux Fermi 5.9	Lederman
April 22, 2013	Scientific Linux Fermi 6.4	Ramsey
December 3, 2013	Scientific Linux Fermi 5.10	Lederman
February 18, 2014	Scientific Linux Fermi 6.5	Ramsey
November 18, 2014	Scientific Linux Fermi 6.6	Ramsey
December 8, 2014	Scientific Linux Fermi 5.11	Lederman

== Support policy ==
Fermi Linux follows the Scientific Linux life cycle regarding support and updates.

Fermilab has a Linux community. This includes dedicated email lists and regular meetings provided by the Scientific Linux development team.

== Fermi Linux LTS ==
Fermi Linux LTS is in essence Red Hat Enterprise Linux, recompiled.

Workers in Fermilab took the source code from Red Hat Enterprise Linux in srpm form and recompiled them resulting in binaries in rpm form with the only restrictions being the license from the original source code. They are bundling these binaries into a Linux distribution that is as close to Red Hat Enterprise Linux as they can get. The goal is to ensure that if a program runs and is certified on Red Hat Enterprise Linux, then it will run on the corresponding Fermi Linux release.

== See also ==
- Fermi National Accelerator Laboratory (Fermilab)
- Scientific Linux
- Linux
- Red Hat Linux
- Red Hat Enterprise Linux (RHEL), commercial Linux distribution on which Fermi Linux is based
- CentOS, another Linux distribution based on Red Hat Enterprise Linux
