= Nigel Lockyer =

Particle physicist, Fermilab director

Nigel Lockyer OBE
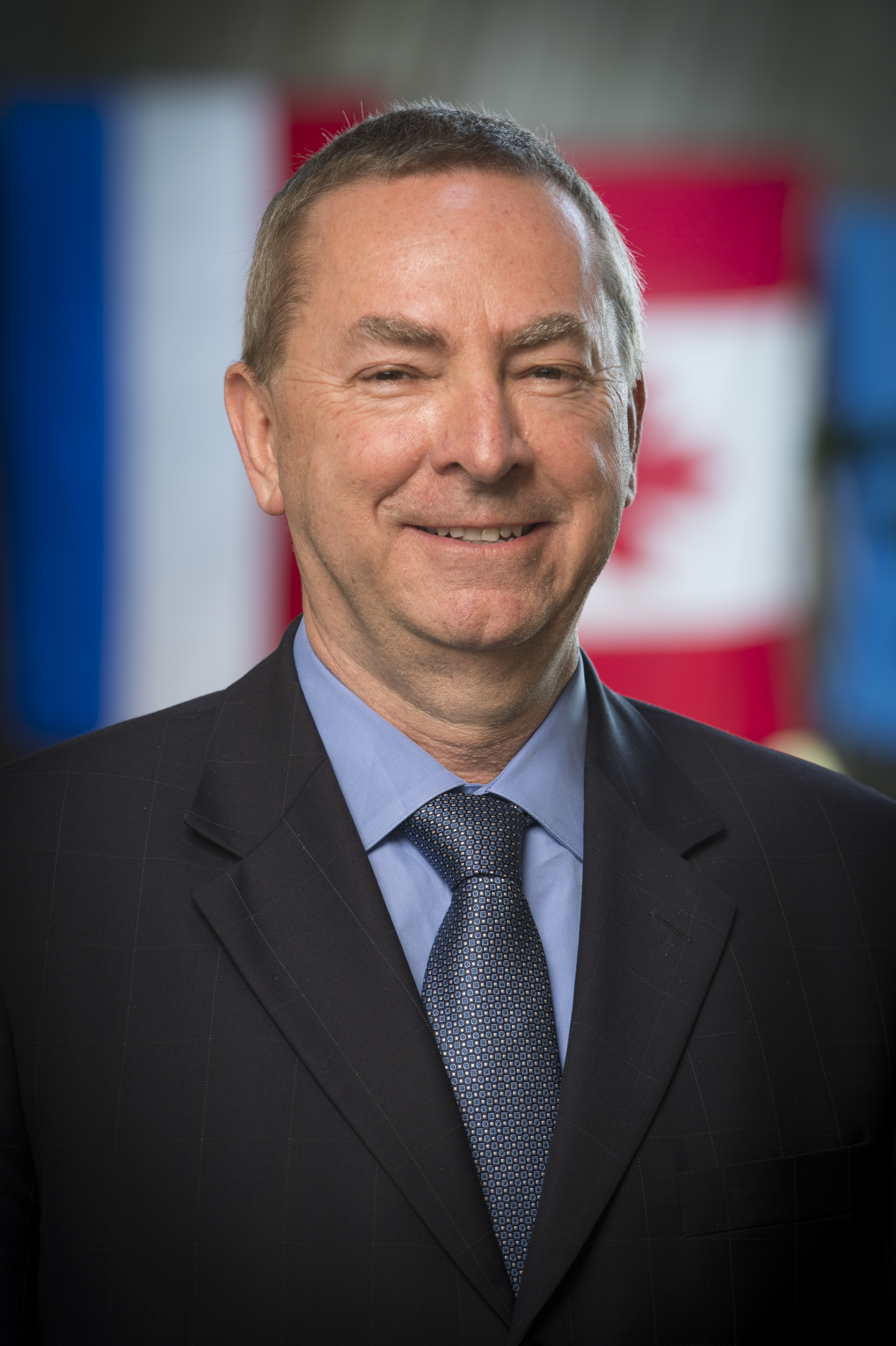
- Lockyer in 2016

Director of CLASSE
- Incumbent
- Assumed office May 1, 2023

6th Director of the Fermilab
- In office September 3, 2013 – April 18, 2022
- President: Barack Obama; Donald Trump; Joe Biden
- Preceded by: Piermaria Oddone
- Succeeded by: Lia Merminga

7th Director of TRIUMF
- In office May 2007 – September 2013
- Preceded by: Alan Shotter
- Succeeded by: Jonathan Bagger

Personal details
- Born: Nigel Stuart Lockyer; November 5, 1952 (age 73) Annan, Scotland
- Education: York University (BS); Ohio State University (PhD)

Nigel Stuart Lockyer OBE (born 5 November 1952) is a British-American experimental particle physicist. He is the current director of the Cornell Laboratory for Accelerator-based ScienceS and Education (CLASSE) as of May 1, 2023. He was the Director of the Fermi National Accelerator Laboratory (Fermilab), in Batavia, Illinois, the leading particle physics laboratory in the United States, from September 2013 to April 2022.

Prior to becoming Fermilab's Director, Lockyer served as Director of TRIUMF, Canada's national laboratory for particle and nuclear physics, from May 2007 to September 2013, and was a professor of physics at the University of British Columbia and University of Pennsylvania. He was born in Scotland, raised in Canada, and attended graduate school in the United States.

== Early life and career ==
Lockyer was born in Annan, Scotland. He received his Bachelor of Science degree in 1975 from York University in Toronto, and in 1980 obtained his Ph.D. from Ohio State University.

After receiving his Ph.D., Lockyer spent four years at SLAC National Accelerator Laboratory at Stanford University as a postdoctoral research fellow, working with Nobel Laureate Burton Richter, who directed SLAC from 1984 to 1999. At SLAC, he was a spokesperson for the Mark-II collaboration.

In 1984, Lockyer began his 23-year career as a physics faculty member at the University of Pennsylvania. While at UPenn Lockyer also lectured on Benjamin Franklin, and taught a class with playwright Tom Stoppard on his Arcadia.

== Research and contributions in medicine and energy ==
Lockyer is a particle physicist. At the University of Pennsylvania, his research focused on high-energy particle experiments at the energy frontier, with an interest in testing fundamental symmetries and studying the heaviest quarks. In recent years, his research has included experimental searches for hypothesized "supersymmetric" particles. While at UPenn, Lockyer developed his interest in the applications of physics to real-world problems; he worked with the Penn Medical School on proton therapy for cancer and detectors for medical physics and developed an interest in superconducting radio frequency applications to accelerators.

From 2002 to 2004, Lockyer served as co-spokesperson for a 600-person international collaboration known as CDF, the Collider Detector at Fermilab experiment at the laboratory's Tevatron particle accelerator. The project achieved world acclaim for discovering and studying the top quark, one of the fundamental building blocks of nature, a counterpart to the bottom quark.

== TRIUMF ==
Lockyer served as director of TRIUMF, Canada's national laboratory for particle and nuclear physics from 2007 until 2013. Towards the end of his mandate, 2013 to 2014, he was also chair of the International Committee for Future Accelerators, a working group of the International Union of Pure and Applied Physics. Under Lockyer's leadership, TRIUMF framed an ambitious vision to achieve a world-class program in rare-isotope beams and subatomic-physics research, to address some of the most fundamental questions in science. This vision included expanding the nuclear-medicine program and the formulation of ARIEL, a new flagship facility for the study of isotopes for physics and medicine. Lockyer expanded the laboratory's operations, earning a reputation as a national leader and team-builder. He also developed a strong working partnership among Canada's major science laboratories, expanded the number of member universities, and built international collaborations with Japan, India, China, and Korea.

== Fermilab ==
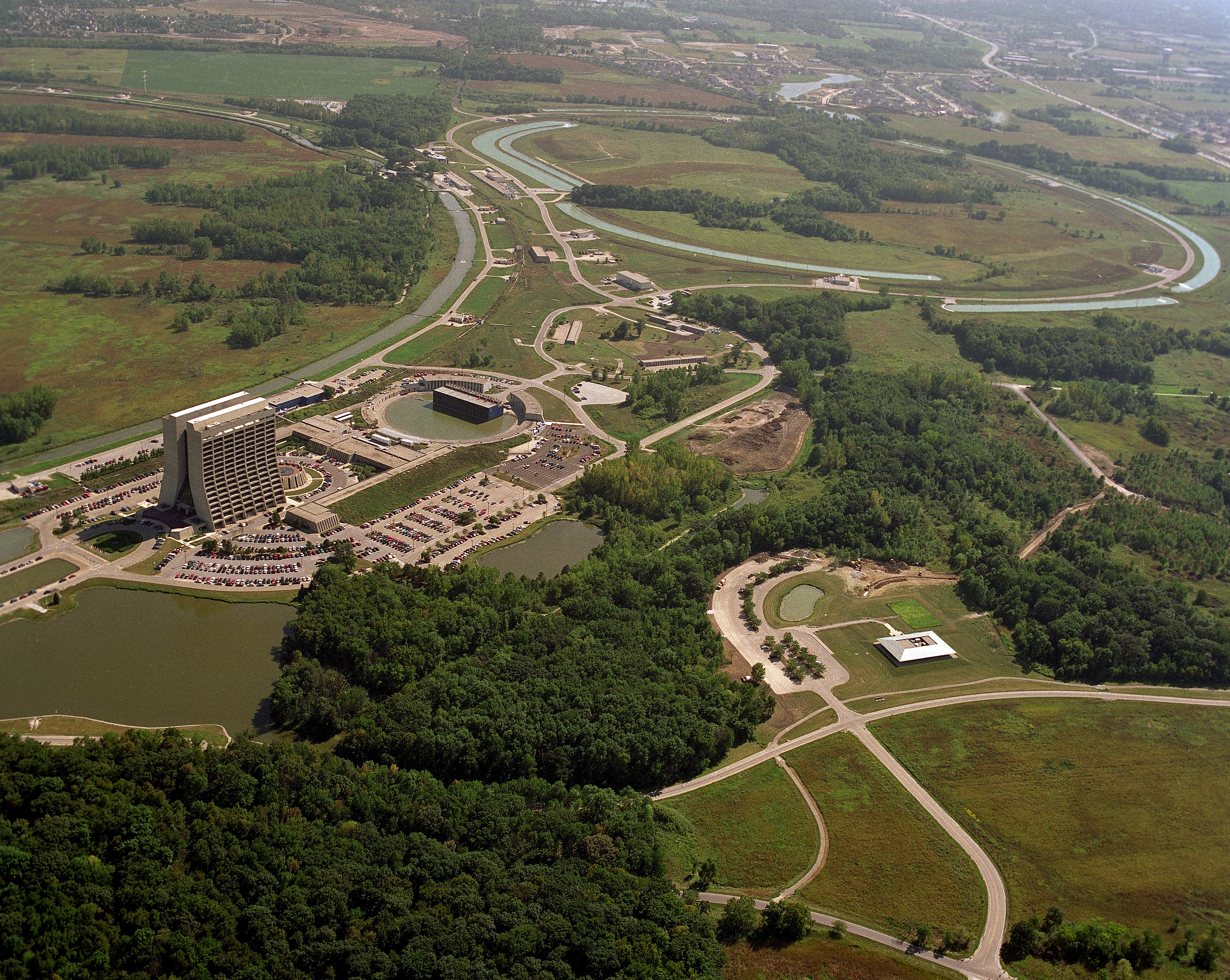
Aerial view of Wilson Hall, Leon M. Lederman Science Education Center and Accelerators

Lockyer was the director of Fermilab from September 3, 2013, to April 18, 2022. During his directorship, he oversaw the laboratory's particle accelerators and experimental facilities. Approximately 4,000 scientists from over 50 countries use these facilities annually for research in particle physics.

Fermilab has the most powerful neutrino beams in the world to explore the nature of neutrinos and is proposing a project to host the first large-scale, international basic science project on U.S. soil. The Deep Underground Neutrino Experiment, or DUNE, is a proposed world-leading neutrino experiment, which includes more than 1,000 scientists from more than 30 countries and 170 institutions, and involves construction at both Fermilab and the Sanford Underground Research Facility (Sanford Lab) in Lead, South Dakota.

CERN, representing European institutions, is a major partner in the experiment. CERN has developed a neutrino platform to advance technology for neutrino experiments, with a significant part of this effort focused on DUNE. Fermilab will improve its Short-Baseline Neutrino Program with three detectors: MicroBoone, which completed in 2021; ICARUS, which arrived from CERN at the end of 2016 and started taking data in 2017; and the smaller Short-Baseline Neutrino Experiment (SBND), which was completed in 2024 and has started taking data. All three detectors will work in unison to search for sterile neutrinos and to advance liquid argon Time Project Chamber technology which has been adopted by DUNE. ICARUS, was refurbished at CERN after four years at the Italian Institute for Nuclear Physics (INFN) Gran Sasso National Laboratory and was transported to Fermilab by a group of scientists led by Carlo Rubbia, Nobel Laureate in Physics.

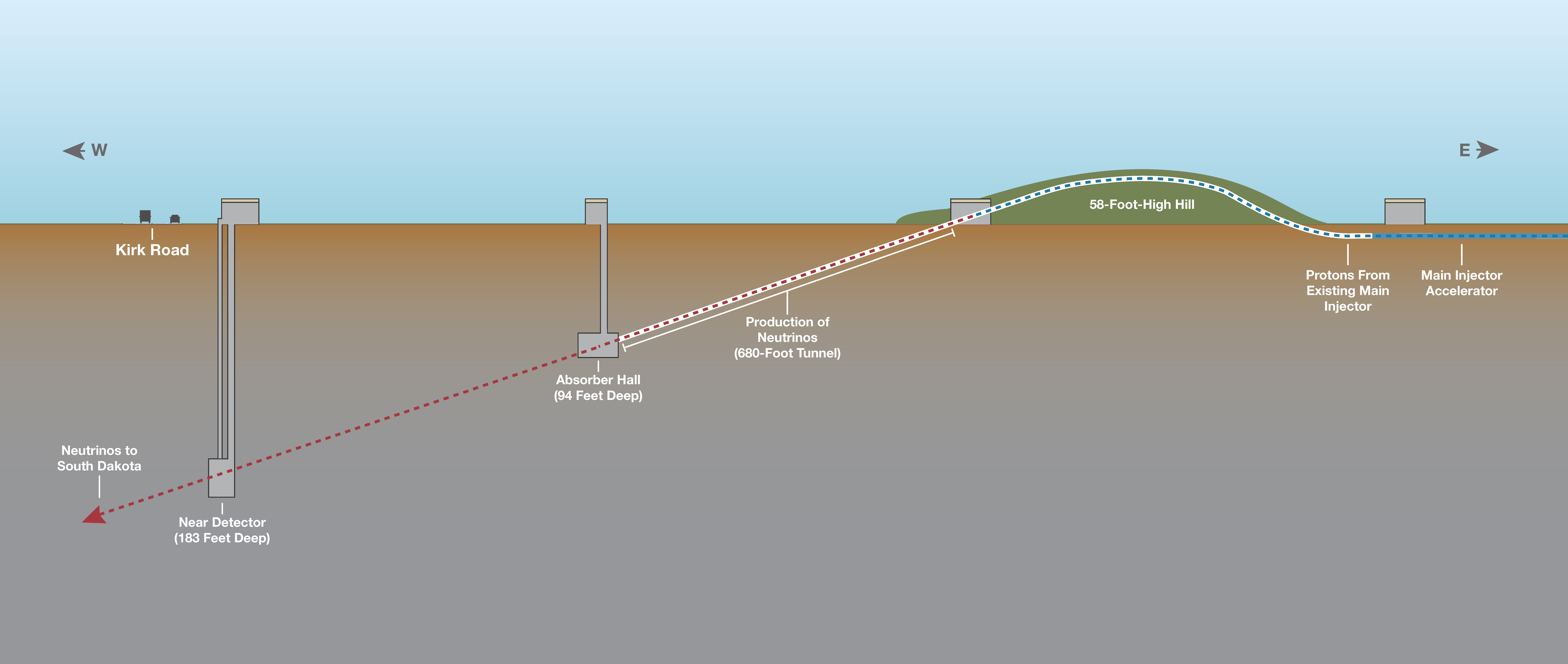
LBNF / DUNE graphics - The LBNF neutrino beamline at Fermilab

The facility required for the Deep Underground Neutrino Experiment, the Long-Baseline Neutrino Facility (LBNF) will comprise the world's highest-intensity neutrino beam at Fermilab and the infrastructure necessary to support detectors installed deep underground at Sanford Lab. Using accelerators at Fermilab, an intense beam of neutrinos would be produced and travel 1300 kilometers through the earth to an underground neutrino detector at Sanford Lab. LBNF would be the most powerful tool in the world to study neutrinos and has been identified by the U.S. particle physics community as the highest priority domestic construction project.

Excavation of an underground facility, including labs and neutrino detector in the Black Hills of South Dakota began in 2017 and was completed in 2024, while construction at Fermilab is scheduled to be completed around 2030.

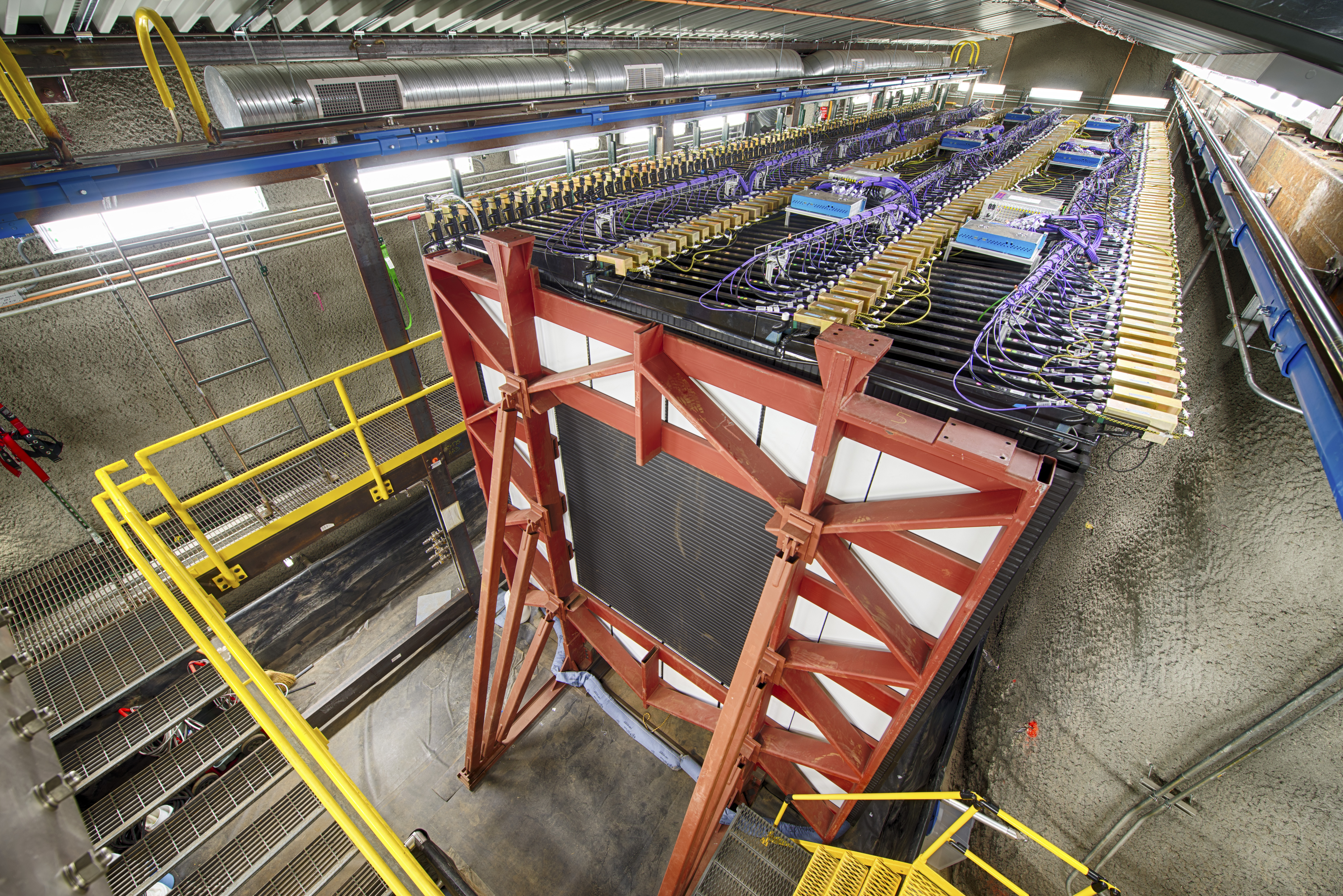
NOvA Near Detector

In order to supply the required intense bean of neutrinos to the detectors at the new and far sites Fermilab has proposed the Proton Improvement Plan II (PIP-II). The project, which will improve Fermilab's particle accelerator complex with a major overhaul and power boost, will involve retiring the cooper linac and building a new superconducting radio-frequency linac. The proposed upgrade to the linear accelerator involves an international collaboration with India, whose Department of Atomic Energy will contribute hardware in exchange for experience in building high-intensity superconducting radio-frequency proton linacs.

The largest of Fermilab's new projects is the recently completed NOvA Neutrino Experiment at Fermilab and in Ash River, Minnesota. NOvA will investigate neutrino oscillations, a phenomenon that could hold important clues to the evolution of the early universe. The first NOvA results, which were released in August 2015, verify the experiment's massive particle detector is detecting neutrinos fired from 800 kilometers away and making great progress towards its goal of a major leap in our understanding of neutrinos.

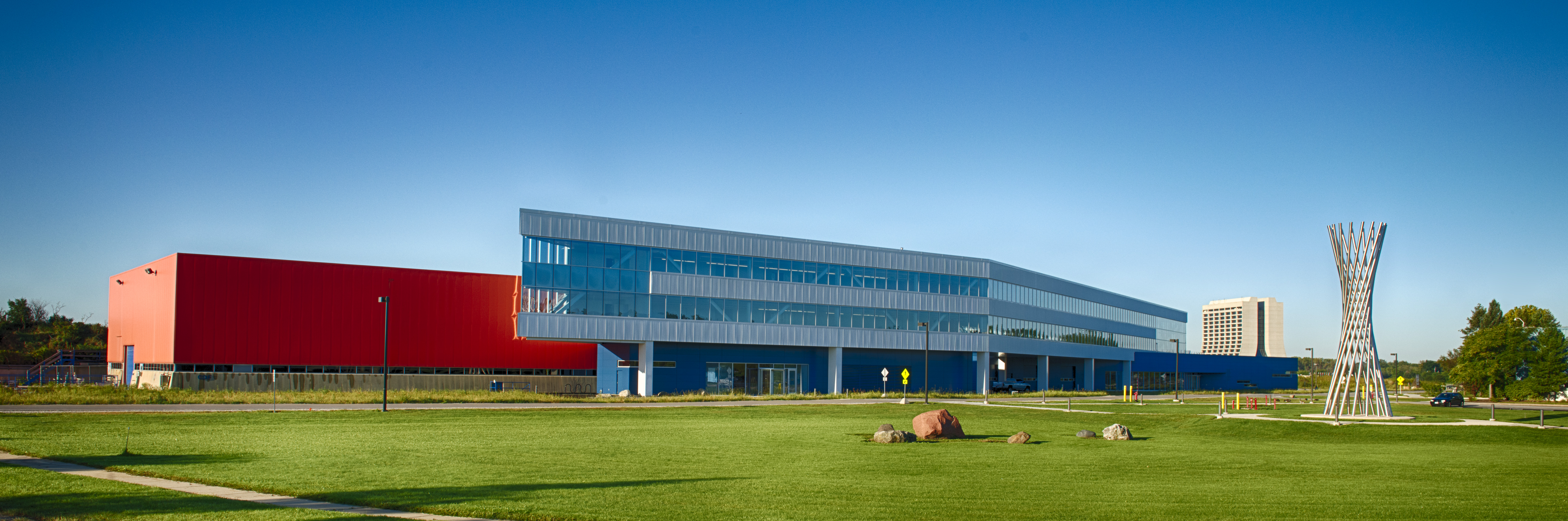
Fermilab's Illinois Accelerator Research Center (IARC) is a cutting-edge facility that unites scientists and engineers from Fermilab, Argonne, and Illinois universities with industrial partners

Fermilab is a U.S. hub for research into the Higgs boson and other high energy phenomena and is making major upgrades of the Compact Muon Solenoid (CMS) detector—one of two large detectors located at the Large Hadron Collider (LHC) at CERN in Europe.

Fermilab is involved in cosmic research through the Dark Energy Survey, which includes over 120 scientists from 23 institutions in the United States, Spain, United Kingdom, Brazil, and Germany. The project relies on a Dark Energy camera, a high-resolution camera built at Fermilab for a telescope in Chile that will look for evidence of dark energy that is responsible for the expansion of the universe. In March 2015, a team of researchers using data collected during the first year of the survey discovered a rare dwarf satellite galaxy orbiting the Milky Way.

In the fields of astrophysics and particle physics, the nature of Dark Matter is important, and Fermilab is engaged in several generation one dark matter searches, including DAMIC, SuperCDMS, PICO, and Darkside50.

A new state-of-the-art facility being built at Fermilab, the Illinois Accelerator Research Center, or IARC, will provide resources for accelerator industrialization. The facility will allow not only scientists and engineers from Fermilab, but those from Argonne National Laboratory and Illinois universities to collaborate with partners from industry to develop breakthroughs in accelerator technology and new applications in energy and environment, medicine, industry, national security and discovery science.

== Awards and honors ==
Lockyer is a fellow of the American Physical Society. In 2006, Lockyer was awarded the American Physical Society's W.K.H. Panofsky Prize for having measured the abnormally long lifetime of the B quark while at SLAC's Mark-II. In 2014 Lockyer received the Pinnacle Achievement Bryden Award from York University for achievement in his field. In May 2015, Lockyer received an honorary doctoral degree from Northern Illinois University.

He was appointed Officer of the Order of the British Empire (OBE) in the 2022 New Year Honours for services to science and UK-US relations.
