= Scientific Linux =

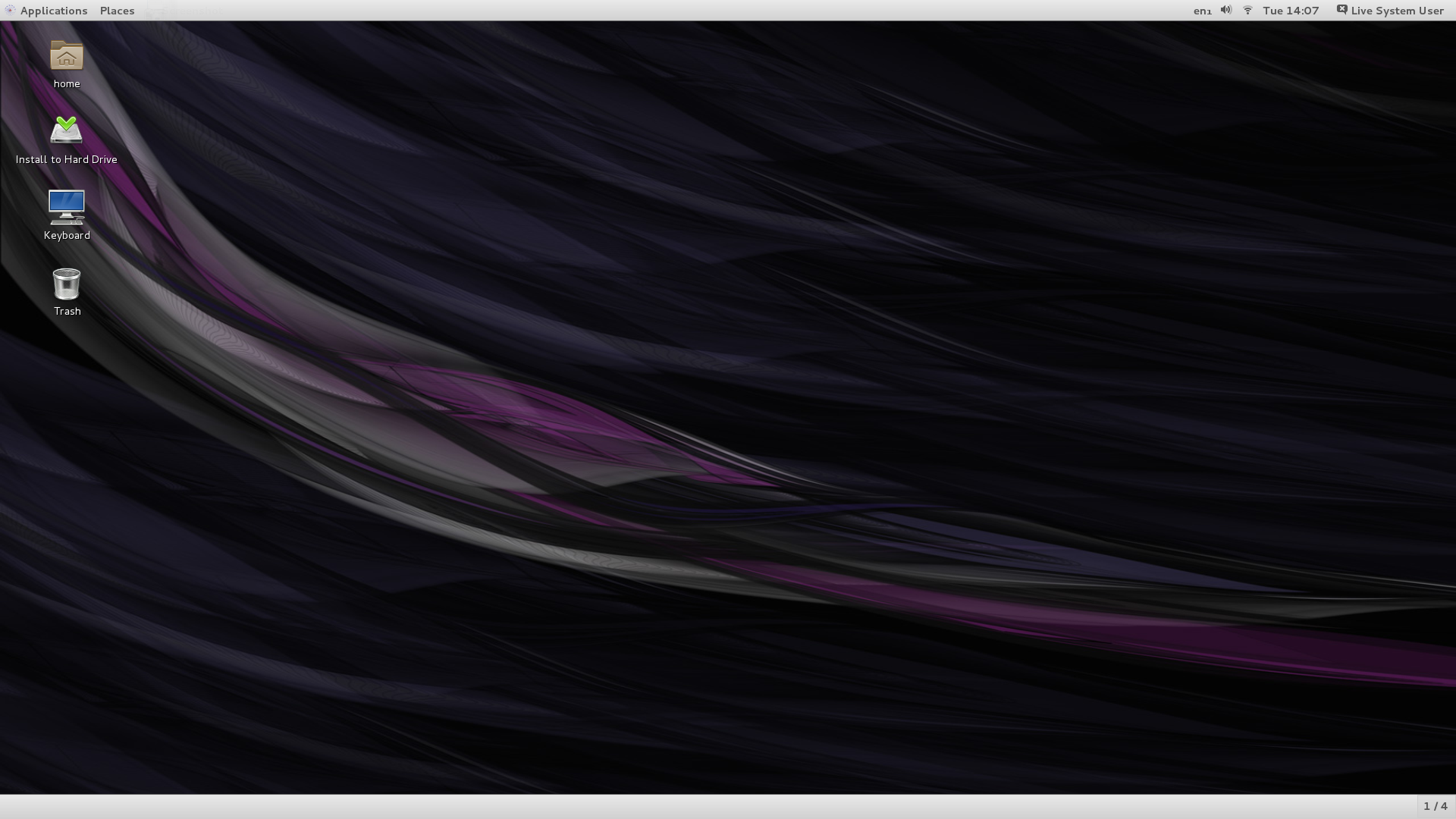
- Scientific Linux 7.0 with GNOME
- Developer: Fermi National Accelerator Laboratory (Fermilab) / European Organization for Nuclear Research (CERN)
- OS family: Linux (Unix-like)
- Working state: Discontinued
- Source model: Open source
- Initial release: May 10, 2004; 22 years ago
- Final release: 7.9 / 20 October 2020; 5 years ago
- Marketing target: Scientific purpose / High Performance Computing / Servers / Desktops
- Update method: Yum (PackageKit)
- Package manager: RPM Package Manager
- Supported platforms: x86, x86-64
- Kernel type: Monolithic (Linux)
- Default user interface: GNOME
- License: GNU GPL & Various others.
- Official website: www.scientificlinux.org

Scientific Linux (SL) is a discontinued Linux distribution produced by Fermilab, CERN, DESY and by ETH Zurich. It is a free and open-source operating system based on Red Hat Enterprise Linux.

This product is derived from the free and open-source software made available by Red Hat, but is not produced, maintained or supported by them.

In April 2019, it was announced that feature development for Scientific Linux would be discontinued, but that maintenance will continue to be provided for the 6.x and 7.x releases through the end of their life cycles. Fermilab and CERN will utilize CentOS Stream and AlmaLinux for their deployment of the 8.x release instead.

== History ==
Fermilab already had a Linux distribution known as Fermi Linux, a long-term support release based on Red Hat Enterprise Linux. CERN was creating their next version of CERN Linux, also based on RHEL. CERN contacted Fermilab about doing a collaborative release. Connie Sieh was the main developer and driver behind the first prototypes and initial release. The first official release of Scientific Linux was version 3.0.1, released on May 10, 2004.

In 2012 Scientific Linux was maintained by a cooperative of science labs and universities. Fermilab was its primary sponsor.

In 2015, CERN began migrating away from Scientific Linux to CentOS.

== Design philosophy ==
The primary purpose of Scientific Linux is to produce a common Linux distribution for various labs and universities around the world, thus reducing duplicated effort. The main goals are to have everything compatible with Red Hat Enterprise Linux with only minor additions and changes, and to allow easy customization for a site, without disturbing the Linux base. Unlike other distributions such as Poseidon Linux, it does not contain a large collection of scientific software as its name may suggest. However, it provides good compatibility to install such software.

== Features ==
Scientific Linux is derived from Red Hat Enterprise Linux without protected components such as Red Hat trademarks, thus making it freely available. New releases are typically produced about two months after each Red Hat release. As well as a full distribution equal to two DVDs, Scientific Linux is also available in LiveCD and LiveDVD versions.

Scientific Linux offers wireless and Bluetooth out of the box, and it comes with a comprehensive range of software, such as multimedia codecs, Samba, and Compiz, as well as servers and clients, storage clients, networking, and system administration tools.

It also contains a set of tools for making custom versions, thus allowing institutions and individuals to create their own variant.

== Release history ==
Historical releases of Scientific Linux are the following. Each release is subjected to a period of public testing before it is considered 'released'.

Scientific Linux release	Codename	Architectures	RHEL base	Scientific Linux release date	Red Hat Enterprise Linux release date	Delay
3.0.1	Lithium	i386, x86-64	3.1	2004-05-10	2004-01-16	106d
4	Beryllium	i386, x86-64	4	2005-04-20	2005-02-14	65d
5	Boron	i386, x86-64	5	2007-05-14	2007-03-14	61d
6	Carbon	i386, x86-64	6	2011-03-03	2010-11-10	113d
7	Nitrogen	x86-64	7	2014-10-13	2014-06-10	125d

=== Support ===
Security updates are provided for as long as Red Hat continues to release updates and patches for their versions.

End of support schedule
Scientific Linux release	Full updates	Maintenance updates
3	2006-07-20	2010-10-31
4	2009-03-31	2012-02-29
5	Q1 2014	2017-03-31
6	Q2 2017	2020-11-30
7	Q4 2019	2024-06-30

== See also ==
- Fermi Linux, Fermilab's own custom version of Scientific Linux
- CentOS, another distribution based on Red Hat Enterprise Linux
- AlmaLinux, the recommended replacement distribution
- Rocks Cluster Distribution, a Linux distribution intended for high-performance computing clusters
