= Young-Kee Kim =

Korean-American physicist and academic

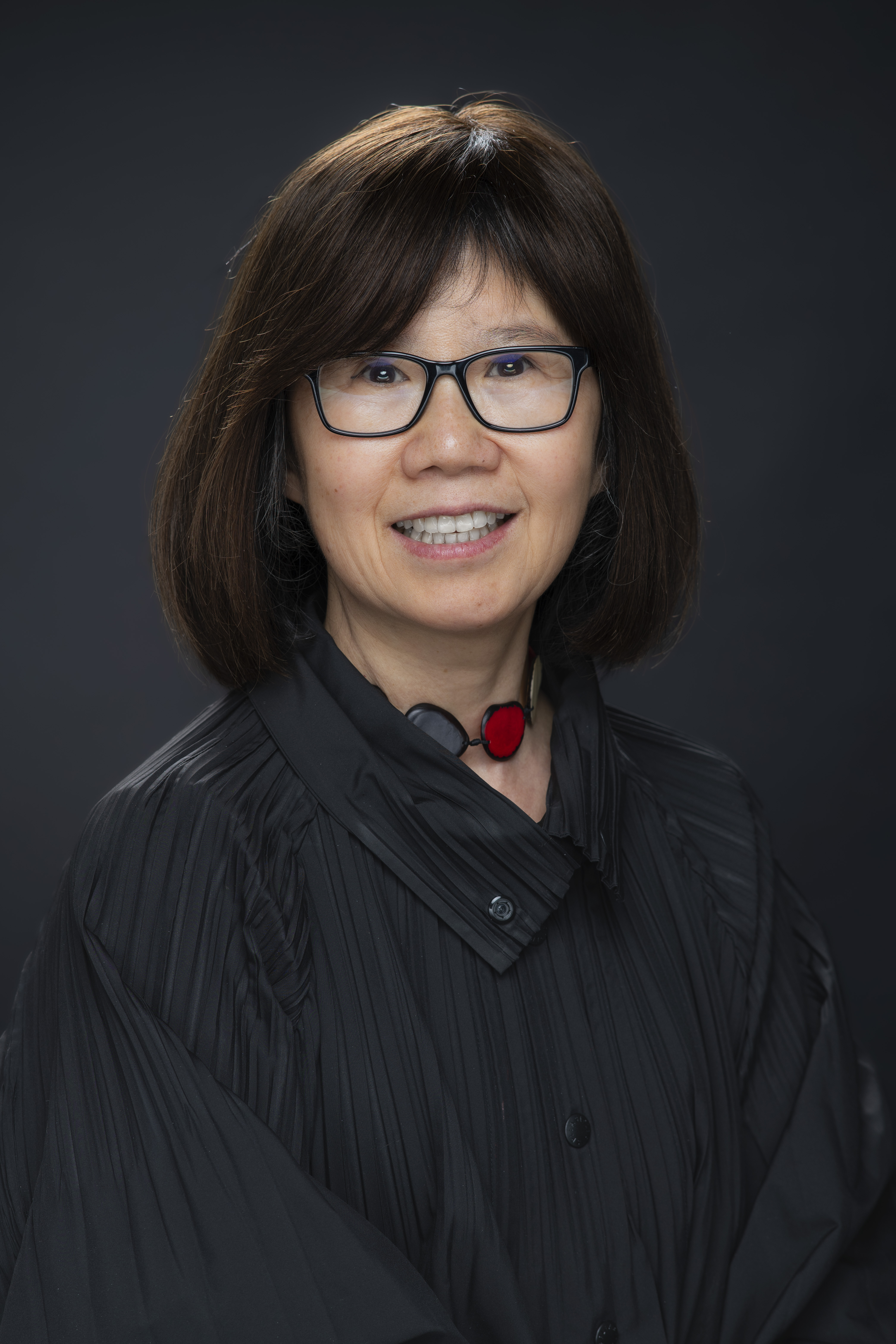
- Born: November 25, 1962 (age 63)
- Education: Ph.D. University of Rochester Korea University
- Known for: President of the American Physical Society (2024); Co-Spokesperson of the CDF Experiment (2004-2006); Deputy Director of Fermilab (2006-2013); Chair of Physics Department at U.Chicago (2016-2022)
- Awards: Member, National Academy of Sciences (2022); Member, American Academy of Arts and Sciences (2017); Ho-Am Prize in Science (2005); APS Fellow (2004); Fellow, American Association for the Advancement of Science (2012)
- Scientific career
- Fields: Particle physics
- Workplaces: University of Chicago, Physics, Professor
- Doctoral advisor: Stephen Olsen

Korean name
- Hangul: 김영기
- RR: Gim Yeonggi
- MR: Kim Yŏnggi
- Website: http://hep.uchicago.edu/~ykkim/index.shtml

Young-Kee Kim (born November 25, 1962) is an American physicist and the Albert Michelson Distinguished Service Professor of Physics at the University of Chicago and the Director Emeritus of Fermi National Accelerator Laboratory (Fermilab). Previously, she served as President of the American Physical Society. Her current work is focused on understanding the origin of mass for fundamental particles (the Higgs mechanism).

== Early life and education ==
Kim was born in Kyeong-Book, South Korea and spent her childhood in the countryside. She received her bachelor’s degree in physics in 1984 and her master’s degree in theoretical particle physics in 1986 from Korea University. She moved to the United States in 1986 to pursue graduate studies in experimental particle physics at the University of Rochester. She received a Doctor of Philosophy in physics in 1990.

== Career ==
After her Ph.D., Kim joined Lawrence Berkeley National Laboratory as a research fellow. She became an assistant professor in 1996, an associate professor in 2000, and a professor of physics in 2002 at University of California, Berkeley. She moved to the University of Chicago in 2003 and was named the Louis Block Professor of Physics in 2011, the Louis Block Distinguished Service Professor in 2017, and the Albert A. Michelson Distinguished Service Professor in 2024. She also has an appointment at the Enrico Fermi Institute at the University of Chicago. She served as chair of the Department of Physics between 2016 and 2022. In 2022, she received the Arthur L. Kelly Faculty Prize for Exceptional Service from the University of Chicago. Kim is the Director Emeritus of Fermilab, after serving as the Interim Director in 2025 and as the Deputy Director between 2006 and 2013.

== Research ==
As an experimental particle physicist, Kim has devoted much of her research work to understanding the origin of mass for fundamental particles by studying the W boson and the top quark, two of the most massive elementary particles and by studying the Higgs boson that gives mass to elementary particles. She also works in accelerator science, playing a leadership role in NSF's Science and Technology Center, the Center for Bright Beams.

Kim started at the AMY experiment at TRISTAN in Japan, then the highest-energy electron-positron collider. There, she studied the properties of quantum chromodynamics, the gauge theory of the strong nuclear force, via the properties of jets of particles originating from quarks or gluons.

She subsequently moved to the CDF experiment at the Tevatron in the U.S., which at the time was the highest-energy hadron collider. Kim served as co-spokesperson of the CDF experiment between 2004 and 2006.

In 2009, she moved to the ATLAS experiment at the Large Hadron Collider (LHC), the current highest-energy hadron collider, to study the origin of mass for fundamental particles (the Higgs mechanism). Kim’s research group has led precise measurements of both the W and top-quark masses predicting the Higgs boson mass, and subsequently the Higgs’s decay properties (the Higgs boson decaying into two bottom quarks and into two dark matter particles) and potential (via production of two or three Higgs bosons).

In addition, Kim has been exploiting novel concepts in accelerator science and technology, studying limitations affecting the acceleration and intensity of particle beams at a fundamental level, and developing new approaches, including AI, to overcome these limitations.

== Awards and honors ==
- 1987: Rush Rhees Fellow
- 1997: Alfred P. Sloan Fellow
- 2004: Fellow, American Physical Society
- 2005: Ho-Am Prize in Science
- 2010: Distinguished Scholar Medal, University of Rochester
- 2011: Fellow, American Association for the Advancement of Science
- 2012: Alumni Award, Korea University
- 2012: Leadership Award, Women in Science, Chicago Council of Science and Technology
- 2017: Elected Member, American Academy of Arts and Sciences
- 2019: Scientist of the Year Award, Korean American Scientists and Engineers Association
- 2022: Elected Member, National Academy of Sciences
- 2022: Elected Foreign Member, Korean Academy of Science and Technology
- 2022: Arthur L. Kelly Faculty Prize for Exceptional Service, Physical Sciences Division, University of Chicago
- 2026: Elected Fellow of the Royal Society

== Research Leaderships ==
- 1993–1999: Leader, CDF W Mass Analysis Group
- 1995–1996: Co-Leader, CDF Electroweak Physics Group
- 2000: Associate Project Manager, CDF Run II Upgrade
- 2001: Associate Head, CDF Run II Detector Operations
- 2002: Co-Leader, CDF Level-3 Trigger System
- 2003–2004: Co-Leader, CDF Top Mass Analysis Group
- 2004–2006: Co-Spokesperson, CDF Collaboration at the Tevatron proton-antiproton collider at Fermilab
- 2013-Present: Theme Leader, Center for Bright Beams (NSF's Science and Technology Center)
