= Rudolf Muradyan =

Armenian theoretical physicist (1936–2024)

Rudolf Muradovich Muradyan
- Ռուդոլֆ Մուրադի Մուրադյան
- Born: 19 June 1936; Yerevan, Armenian SSR, USSR
- Died: 9 November 2024 (aged 88)
- Citizenship: Armenian SSR; USSR; Brazil
- Education: Moscow State University
- Awards
- Scientific career
- Fields: Theoretical physics, Elementary-Particle Physics and Cosmology
- Workplaces: Institute of Physics of the Federal University of Bahia
- Thesis: Origin of magnetic fields and superdense cosmogony (1978)

Rudolf Muradovich Muradyan (Armenian: Ռուդոլֆ Մուրադի Մուրադյան; 19 June 1936 – 9 November 2024) was an Armenian theoretical physicist. Rudolf Muradyan's main research relate to theoretical physics, elementary-particle physics, cosmology and the origin of the Universe. Considering the properties of the interaction of elementary particles, he proposed the possibility of large-scale invariance in high-energy physics, from which the "Matveev-Muradyan-Tavkhelidze quark counting rule" is derived especially. He also researched the connection between the appearance of the Universe's rotation and magnetic fields and the cosmological constant. He is the recipient of the 1988 Lenin Prize, along with Albert Tavkhelidze and Viktor Matveev, for the discovery of dimensional quark counting rules.

== Biography ==
Rudolf Muradyan was born on June 19, 1936, in Yerevan, Armenia. After graduating from the Yerevan Secondary School № 25 in 1953, Muradyan entered the Faculty of Physics at Moscow State University in Moscow, graduating in 1959. In 1962 he finished his postgraduate study in the Faculty of Physics of Moscow State University and defended his thesis for a PhD in Physics and Mathematics. He then worked at the Laboratory of Theoretical Physics of the Joint Institute of Nuclear Research (OIJI) in Dubna near Moscow between 1962-1979 (from 1966 as a senior research fellow). In 1970 he was awarded a doctorate in physical-mathematical sciences and appointed professor. In 1972 he joined the Communist Party of the Soviet Union. His scientific papers appeared in Theoretical and Mathematical Physics. In 1970 at JINR he defended his thesis for the degree of Doctor of physical and mathematical sciences, and received the academic rank of professor.

In 1979 Rudolf Muradyan moved to Yerevan, he headed the Department of Radiation Studies of the Yerevan Physics Institute in 1979-1984. At the same time he gave special lectures on quantum theory of solids at the Faculty of Physics of Yerevan State University. In 1986 Muradyan was elected a corresponding member of the Academy of Sciences of the Armenian SSR.

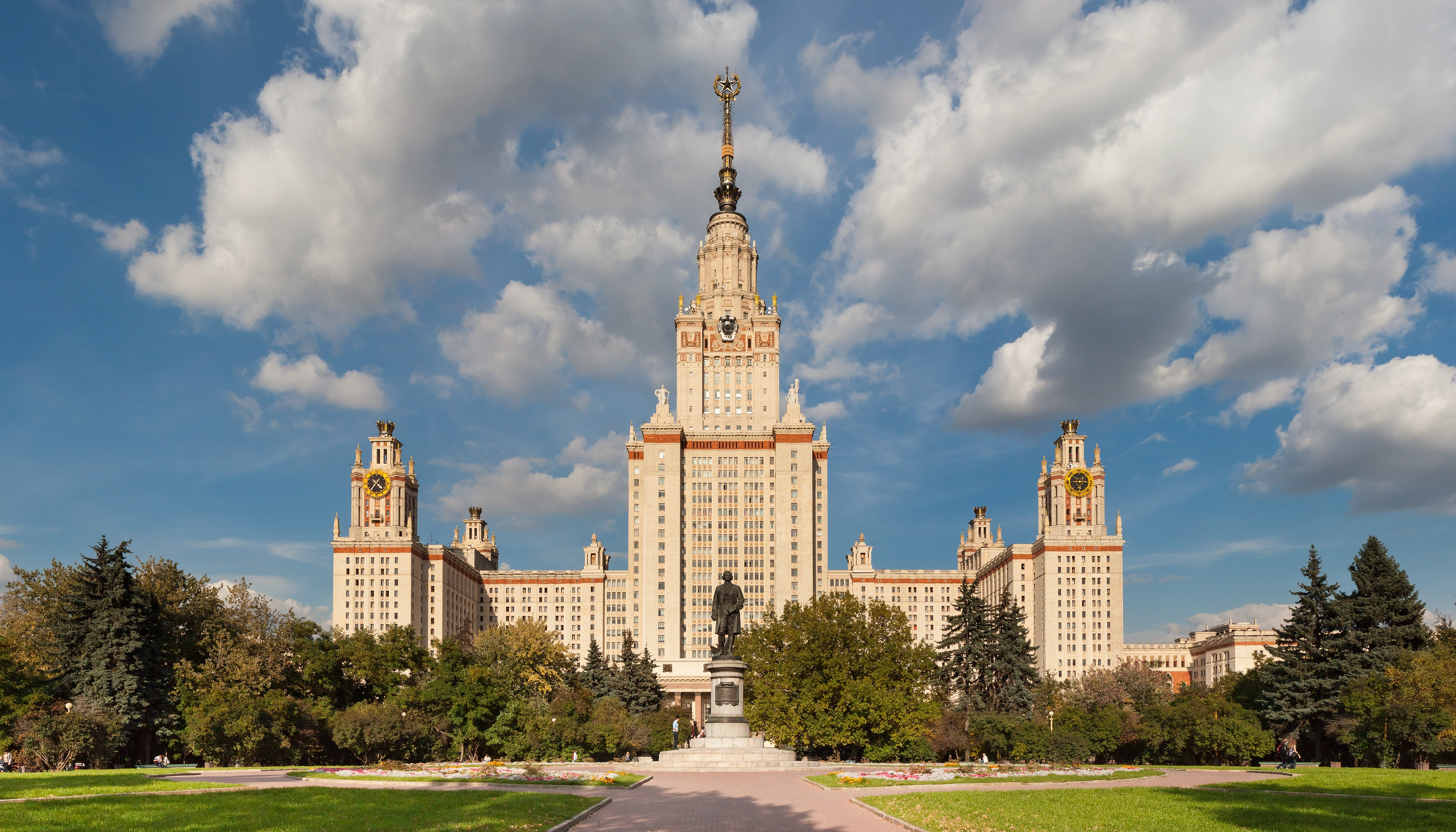
Moscow State University

From 1984 to 1994 he worked at Byurakan Astrophysical Observatory of Armenian SSR Academy of Sciences (NAS RA) as a Leading Researcher and since 1985 he worked as a Team Leader. On October 16, 1994, he was elected an academician of the Pontifical Academy of Sciences. In the same year he moved again to Dubna and worked in the laboratory of theoretical physics of JINR until 1996.

Since 1996 he was professor of the Institute of Physics of the Federal University of Bahia, Salvador, Brazil. In the same year he was elected an academician of the National Academy of Sciences of Armenia.

Muradyan died on 9 November 2024, at the age of 88.

== Scientific Work ==
Rudolf Muradyan's main research is in theoretical physics, elementary particle physics, high-energy physics, cosmology and mathematical physics.

In 1969, based on the quasi-free quark model, Rudolf Muradyan, together with Albert Tavkhelidze and Victor Matveev, proposed that the scaling properties of high-energy electron-nucleon interaction processes found in experiments are common to all deep inelastic lepton-hadron processes. Muradyan, Tavkhelidze and Matveev have developed an automodelicity (self-similarity) principle on the basis of which these properties may be derived directly. According to this principle, many characteristics of processes in the field of high energies and high momentum transfer, including particle form factors, do not depend on characteristic length and momentum scaling of dimensional parameters. They are homogeneous functions of relativistically invariant kinematical variables and a degree of homogeneity of these functions is determined by their physical dimensionality. A scale law describing the mass spectrum of muon pairs produced at high energies in proton $\rho + \rho = \mu^+ + \mu^- +$ hadrons collisions was first established using the principle of automodelicity:

$\frac{d \sigma}{dM^2} \approx \frac{1}{M^4}f\left ( \frac{M}{E} \right )$

Where $M$ is the effective mass of the muon pair and $E$ is the energy of the colliding particles. This sweeping law was confirmed in experimental studies begun in 1970 by Leon Lederman's group at Brookhaven. Subsequently, it was in these processes that a new class of hadrons - $J/\Psi$ particles - were discovered.

In 1973, based on the principle of self-similarity, the so-called "Matveev-Muradyan-Tavkhelidze quark counting rules" were established. They define the asymptotics of the form factors at large momentum transfer $Q =\sqrt{-t}$ as well as the nature of the energy dependence of the differential cross section of an arbitrary binary scattering reaction at large angles at high energies $E=\sqrt{s}$:

$\left ( \frac{d\sigma}{dt} \right )_{ab\rightarrow cd}\approx \left ( \frac{1}{t} \right )^{n-2}f\left ( \frac{t}{s} \right )$

Where $N = N_a + N_b + N_c + N_d$ is the total number of elementary hadron components participating in the reaction. In this case $N_b=1$ if the particle $b$ is a structureless lepton. The function $f\left ( \frac{t}{s} \right )$depends only on the ratio of large kinematic variables. It is a dimensional quantity and the natural scale here is the effective particle size. The power asymptotic law indicates factorization of large and small distance effects. In 1987 in the State Register of Discoveries of the USSR the discovery (№343) "Rule of quark counting by Matveev-Muradyan-Tavkhelidze" was registered. In 1970-1980s Rudolf Muradyan together with his colleagues performed a significant cycle of works on application of the automodelicity principle and generalization of quark counting rules for multiple and inclusive processes using a three-dimensional formulation of quantum field theory. According the resolution of the Central Committee of the Communist Party of the Soviet Union and Council of Ministers of April 15, 1988, Rudolf Muradyan together with his colleagues was awarded the Lenin Prize for the cycle of studies on the dynamic regularities in the quark structure of elementary particles and atomic nuclei (1965-1977).

Muradyan investigated the emergence of the Universe, stars, galaxies from an initial hadron, as well as the connection between the appearance of the Universe's rotation and magnetic fields and the cosmological constant $\Lambda$. In 1976, he discovered a new expression for the angular momentum of the rotation of the Universe:

$J=\hbar\left ( \frac{\hbar c}{Gm_p^2} \right )^3$

Where $\hbar$ is the Dirac constant, $c$ is the speed of light, $G$ is the gravitational constant, and $M_p$ is the proton mass. Muradyan's proposed hypothesis of the emergence of the Universe, related to Victor Hambardzumian's theory of the emergence of the Universe, allows to explain the appearance of the rotation of space objects (stars, galaxies and others) in a quantitative way, based on the known relationship in the physics of elementary particles between mass and rotation momentum. In 1970, Rudolf Muradyan gave an exact solution to the problem of "random walks" on the sphere and in Lobachevsky space. In 1981 he proposed a direct and unified method for constructing irreducible representations for all discrete subgroups of a three-dimensional rotation group, especially for the triangle, tetrahedron and octahedron groups. In 1998, investigating Hopf structures in n-Li - Nambu algebras, he introduced the fundamental concepts of 3-coalgebras, 3-algebras and 3-algebras of Hopf.

In 1990 Rudolf Muradyan proposed the new form of Mendeleev's Periodic Table: the system in which the order of the elements is determined not by the sequence number, but by the structure of the electron shell filling of the atom. This table of elements is based on the quantum-mechanical structure of the atom, and has certain convenience and clarity.
