= Stefan Ritt =

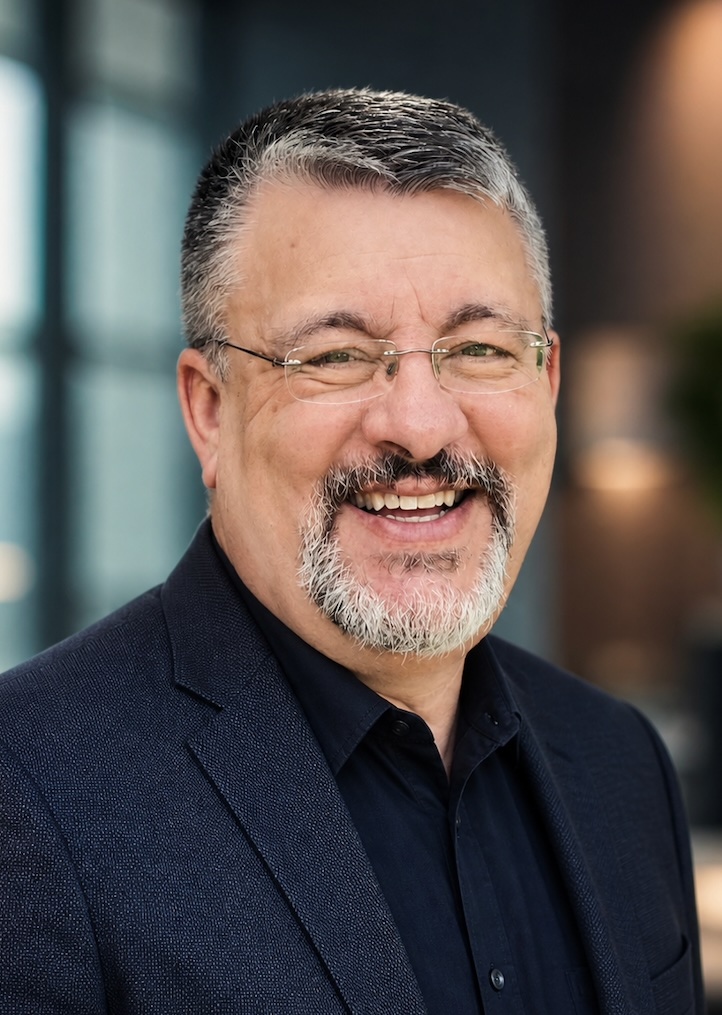
- Stefan Ritt in 2026
- Born: October 10, 1964 (age 61); Pforzheim, Baden-Wuerttemberg, Germany
- Education: University of Karlsruhe
- Known for: DRS4 Switched Capacitor Array Chip, MIDAS, ELOG
- Awards: Fellow of the IEEE, 2016, IEEE Emilio Gatti Radiation Instrumentation Technical Achievement Award, 2020
- Scientific career
- Fields: Particle Physics, cLFV
- Workplaces: Paul Scherrer Institute
- Doctoral advisor: Ed T. Boschitz
- Website: https://www.psi.ch/en/ltp-muon-physics/people/stefan-ritt

Stefan Ritt is a German physicist and head of the muon physics group at the Paul Scherrer Institute, Aargau, Switzerland. He is member of the MEG experiment and co-spokesperson of the Mu3e experiment. He is best known for the development of the DRS4 Switched Capacitor Array Chip, as primary author of the MIDAS Data Acquisition System and as author of the ELOG Electronic Logbook. He is co-author of two patents related to Switched Capacitor Array Circuits and their calibration.

In addition Ritt is an active member of the IEEE Nuclear and Plasma Sciences Society, where he is a Distinguished Lecturer and was Society President 2017-2018.

== Awards ==
- Fellow of the Institute of Electrical and Electronics Engineers (IEEE) in 2016 for the development of the Domino Ring Sampler series of chips
- IEEE Emilio Gatti Radiation Instrumentation Technical Achievement Award in 2020 for contributions to the development and democratization of ultra-high-speed digitizers.
- IEEE NPSS Richard F. Shea Distinguished Member Award For his innovative leadership as the President of the NPSS and an organizer and instructor at NPSS Summer Schools and as a world-leading expert in the field of ultra-fast data acquisition.
- IEEE NPSS CANPS Award For creating and leading the MIDAS DAQ system, enabling reliable, integrated real time data acquisition for experiments worldwide, and for his enduring leadership, innovation, and service to the CANPS community.
