= Decree =

Edict or proclamation usually issued by a head of state

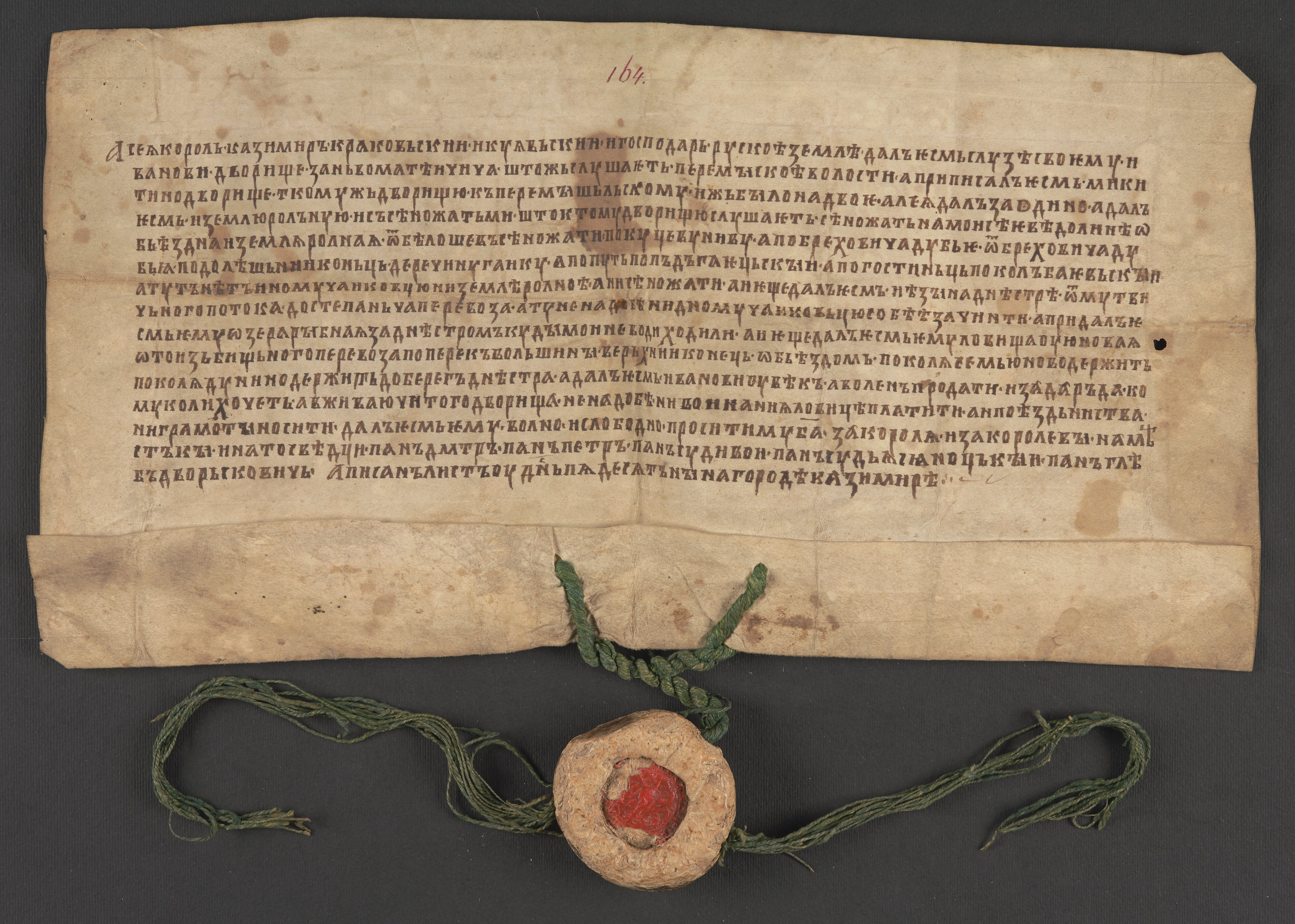
Royal Polish Decree issued by Casimir III the Great

A decree is a legal proclamation, usually issued by a head of state, judge, royal figure, or other relevant authorities, according to certain procedures. These procedures are usually defined by the constitution, legislative laws, or customary laws of a government.

== Belgium ==
In Belgium, a decree is a law of a community or regional parliament, e.g. the Flemish Parliament.

== Catholic Church ==
A decree (Latin: decretum) in the usage of the canon law of the Catholic Church has various meanings. Any papal bull, brief, or motu proprio is a decree inasmuch as these documents are legislative acts of the pope. In this sense, the term is quite ancient. The Roman Congregations were formerly empowered to issue decrees in matters which come under their particular jurisdiction but were forbidden from continuing to do so under Pope Benedict XV in 1917. Each ecclesiastical province and also each diocese may issue decrees in their periodical synods within their sphere of authority.

While in a general sense all documents promulgated by an ecumenical council can be called decrees, in a specific sense some of these documents, as at the Second Vatican Council, were called more precisely constitutions or declarations.

Canon 29 of the 1983 Code of Canon Law defines general decrees:

General decrees, by which a competent legislator makes common provisions for a community capable of receiving a law, are true laws and are regulated by the provisions of the canons on laws.

=== Holy See ===
The Holy See uses decrees from the pope such as papal bull, papal brief or motu proprio as legislative acts.

== France ==
The word décret, literally "decree", is an old legal usage in France and is used to refer to executive orders issued by the French President or Prime Minister. Any such order must not violate the French Constitution or Civil Code, and a party has the right to request an order be annulled in the French Council of State. Orders must be ratified by Parliament before they can be modified into legislative acts. Special orders known as décret-loi, literally "decree-act" or "decree-law", usually considered an illegal practice under the Third and Fourth Republic, were finally abolished and replaced by the regulations under the 1958 Constitution.

Except for the reserve powers of the President (as stated in Art. 16 of the 1958 Constitution, exercised only once so far), the executive can issue decrees in areas that the Constitution grants as the responsibility of Parliament only if a law authorizes it to do so. In other cases, orders are illegal and, should anyone sue for the order's annulment, it would be voided by the Council of State. There exists a procedure for the Prime Minister to issue ordinances in such areas, but this procedure requires Parliament's express consent (see Art 38 of the 1958 Constitution).

Orders issued by the Prime Minister take two forms:

- Orders (décrets simples);
- Orders-in-council (décrets en Conseil d'État), when a statute mandates the advisory consultation of the Council of State.

Sometimes, people refer to décrets en Conseil d'État improperly as décrets du Conseil d'État. This would imply that it is the Council of State that makes the decree, whereas the power of decreeing is restricted to the president or prime minister; the role of the administrative sections of the council is purely advisory.

Decrees may be classified into:

- Regulations, which may be:
  - Application decrees (décrets d'application), each of which must be specifically authorized by one or more statutes to determine some implementation conditions of this or these statutes; these constitute secondary legislation and are roughly equivalent to British statutory instruments;
  - Autonomous regulations (règlements autonomes), which may be taken only in areas where the Constitution does not impose statute law (passed by the Legislature); these constitute primary legislation;
- Particular measures, such as the nomination of high-level civil servants.

Only the prime minister may issue regulatory or application decrees. Presidential decrees are generally nominations or exceptional measures where the law mandates a presidential decree, such as the dissolution of the French National Assembly, the calling of new legislative elections, and the grant of the title Marshal of France.

Decrees are published in the Journal officiel de la République française (French Gazette).

== Gulf countries ==
In some emirates, decrees can be proclaimed by a ruling emir or his representatives (Arabic: المرسوم الأميري) with the force of law.

Examples are:

- Amiri Decree Law No. 13 of 1984 (Bahrain), establishing a High Counsel for Labour Services
- Amiri Decree No. 11/1999 (Qatar) forming a Constitution Drafting Committee
- Amiri Decree No. 3 of 1988 as amended by the Amiri Decree No. 3 of 1996 (Ajman, UAE) creating and granting autonomous status to the Ajman Free Zone

== Iran ==
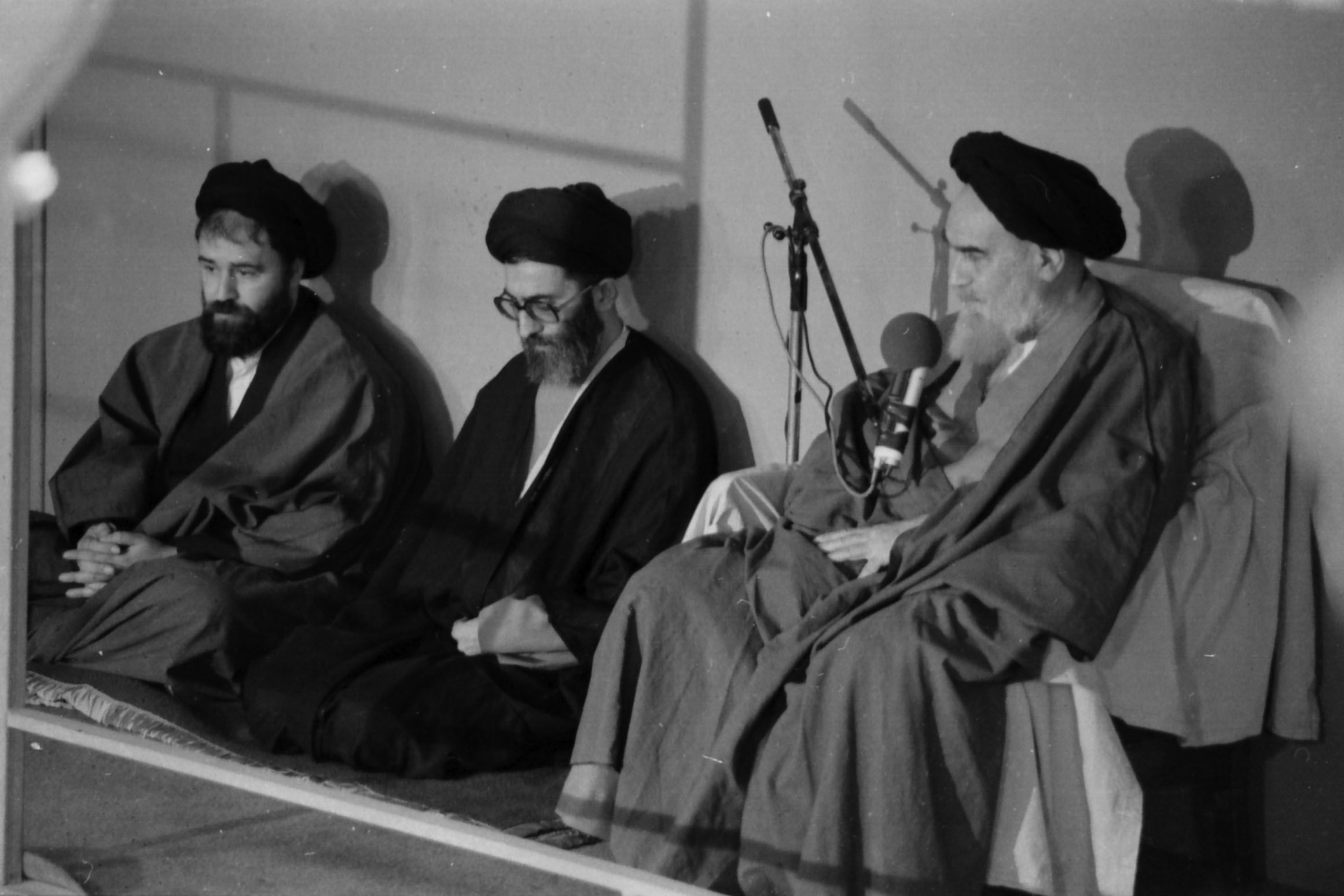
9 October 1981, Jamaran, Tehran; Ruhollah Khomeini as supreme leader of Iran signs presidential decree of Ali Khamenei.

According to article 110 of the constitution, the Supreme Leader delineates the general policies of the Islamic Republic.

== Italy ==
According to clause 77 of the Italian Constitution:

The Government may not, without an enabling act from the Houses [of Parliament], issue decrees having the force of ordinary law.

When in extraordinary cases of necessity and urgency the Government adopts provisional measures having the force of law, it must on the same day present said measures for confirmation to the Houses which, even if dissolved, shall be extraordinally summoned for this purpose and shall convene within five days.

The decrees lose effect from their inception if they are not confirmed within sixty days from their publication. The Houses may however regulate by law legal relationships arising out of unconfirmed decrees.

The effectiveness for sixty days produces the effects immediately, giving rights or expectations whose legal basis was precarious, especially when the conversion law never intervened.

== Kazakhstan ==
In Kazakhstan, a decree (Kazakh: жарлық, romanized: jarlyq, Russian: указ, romanized: ukaz) is defined under Article 45 of the Constitution of the Republic of Kazakhstan as legal acts issued by the President on the basis of and in exercise of the Constitution and laws and are binding throughout the territory of the Republic. Presidential decrees are normative legal acts that must not contradict constitutional or statutory law and are part of the system of legal acts alongside parliamentary legislation.

The Law "On Legal Acts" (No. 480‑V of 6 April 2016) outlines the legal framework and hierarchy of normative acts in Kazakhstan, under which decrees are promulgated.

== Portugal ==
In Portugal there are several types of decree (Portuguese: decreto) issued by the various bodies of sovereignty or by the bodies of local government of autonomous regions.

As of 2022, there are the following types of decree:

1. Decree-law (Portuguese: decreto-lei): is a legislative act issued by the Government of Portugal under its legislative powers defined by Article 198 of the Portuguese Constitution;
2. Regional legislative decree (Portuguese: decreto legislativo regional): is a regional law, issued by the legislative assembly of an autonomous region, within its powers defined by articles 227 and 233 of the Constitution;
3. Decree of the President of the Republic (Portuguese: decreto do Presidente da República): is a decree issued by the President of Portugal, for the ratification of international treaties, the appointment or dismissal of members of the Government or to exercise other presidential powers defined in the Constitution;
4. Decree (Portuguese: decreto): is an act issued by the Government of Portugal to approve an international agreement whose approval is not within the competence of the Assembly of the Republic or has not been submitted to it or within the Government administrative jurisdiction laid down in Article 199 of the Constitution in relation to a statute that requires this decree;
5. Regulatory decree (Portuguese: decreto regulamentar): is an act issued by the Government of Portugal, under its administrative jurisdiction laid down in Article 199 of the Constitution, to make the necessary regulations for the proper execution of the laws and to take all actions and decisions necessary to promote economic and social development and to meet the community needs;
6. Regional regulatory decree (Portuguese: decreto regulamentar regional): is an act issued by the legislature or the government of an autonomous region, regulating the proper implementation of regional legislative decrees;
7. A decree from the representative of the Republic (Portuguese: decreto do representante da República): is the decree of appointment or removal of members of the government of an autonomous region, issued by the representative of the Republic for that region.

== Russia ==
After the Russian Revolution, a government proclamation of wide meaning was called a "decree" (декрет dekret); a more specific proclamation was called an Ukase указ ukaz. Both terms are usually translated as 'decree'.

During the Soviet Union's existence, governmental proclamations issued by the Government of the Soviet Union as well as proclamations issued by the Central Committee of the Communist Party were called Decisions (Постановления Postanovleniya and in some cased joint resolutions were issued.

According to the Russian Federation's 1993 constitution, an ukaz is a presidential decree. Such an ukaz has the force of law, but may not alter the Russian constitution or the regulations of existing laws, and may be superseded by laws passed by the Federal Assembly.

The Government of Russia can also issue decrees formally called Decisions (Постановления Postanovleniya or Orders (Распоряжения Rasporyazheniya) and may not contradict the constitution/laws or presidential decrees.

== Saudi Arabia ==
Royal decrees, along with the Sharia, are the sources of law in the Kingdom of Saudi Arabia.

== Spain ==
In Spain, decrees come in several forms:

- Royal decree
- Royal Decree-Law
- Royal Legislative Decree

== Syria ==
After the fall of the Assad regime in December 2024, Syria adopted a Constitutional Declaration in March 2025 establishing a presidential system in which executive power is vested in the President.

Under Article 36, the President of the Republic issues executive and regulatory regulations, control regulations, and presidential orders and decisions in accordance with the laws.

According to Article 39, the President of the Republic promulgates laws approved by the People's Assembly. He has the right to object to such laws through a reasoned decision within one month from the date of their receipt from the Assembly. A law that has been objected to shall not be approved unless it is passed again by a two-thirds majority of the People's Assembly, in which case the President must issue it by decree.

Under Article 42, the executive authority is responsible for implementing approved laws, plans, and programmes; managing state affairs and executing public policies aimed at achieving stability and development; preparing draft laws for the President of the Republic to submit to the People's Assembly; formulating general state plans; managing public resources and ensuring their effective and transparent use; and rebuilding public institutions while strengthening the rule of law and good governance.

== Thailand ==
After the Siamese revolution of 1932, a decree is a legal proclamation formally issued by the monarch on the advice of the Council of Ministers.

In the Thai legal system, the executive branch possesses the authority to initiate legislation under specific constitutional frameworks. This is primarily achieved through two distinct instruments:

- Royal Decrees (พระราชกฤษฎีกา)
- Emergency Decrees (พระราชกำหนด)

While both are enacted by the King upon the advice of the Council of Ministers, they differ significantly in their legal hierarchy, legislative purpose, and susceptibility to judicial review.

Royal Decree

A Royal Decree is a form of subordinate legislation enacted by the King under authority explicitly granted by higher-level laws, including the Constitution, Organic Acts, Acts of Parliament (พระราชบัญญัติ), or Emergency Decrees. Issued upon the advice of the Council of Ministers, Royal Decrees are primarily utilised for the administration of state affairs.

Based on legal scholarship regarding the 2017 Constitution, Royal Decrees are classified into four main categories based on their source of authority, legal status, and whether they can be challenged in court:

Type 1 Decrees Enacted Under Royal Prerogative: These are enacted by the King as head of state at his sole discretion, as directly prescribed by Section 15 of the Constitution (e.g., the Royal Decree on Organising the Service and Personnel Administration of the Royal Household Affairs 2017).

- Legal Status: Formally subordinate legislation ("rules"), but not substantively subject to standard administrative definitions.
- Judicial Review: Immune to judicial review under the political question doctrine ("Act of Government").

Type 2 Decrees Enacted Under Direct Constitutional Authority (Non-Discretionary): These are issued under the King's constitutional authority as head of state, acting on ministerial advice rather than personal discretion. They fall into three sub-categories:

- Political Acts: Formally legislative but politically natured acts, such as convening Parliament. These are classified as Acts of Government and are exempt from judicial or constitutional review.
- Combined Political and Administrative Acts: Acts such as dissolving the House of Representatives. These do not constitute "rules" in a substantive or abstract sense, exempting them from standard administrative court jurisdiction.
- Non-Administrative Prerogative Acts: Decrees where the King does not act as an administrative authority or state official, yet the outcome acts as a "rule" (e.g., Royal Pardons). The Supreme Administrative Court has ruled these outside its jurisdiction.

Type 3 Decrees Enacted Under Combined Constitutional and Statutory Authority: These decrees rely on direct constitutional provisions combined with specific enabling legislation passed by the legislature.

- Constitutional and Organic Act Authority: Issued jointly by the government and the Election Commission to call general or senatorial elections. They are not considered general administrative rules but are subject to Administrative Court review under Section 231(2) of the Constitution.
- Constitutional and Statutory Authority: Issued by the government acting purely in an administrative capacity. These possess the full legal status of subordinate "rules" under the Administrative Procedure Act 1996 and the Act on Establishment of Administrative Courts and Administrative Court Procedure 1999. They are fully reviewable by the Administrative Court. Examples include decrees on:
  - State enterprise privatisation
  - Land expropriation
  - National park designations
  - Dissolution, amalgamation, or transfer of government agencies

Type 4 Decrees for Executive Branch Administration: Enacted under Section 175 of the Constitution, these are internal regulations governing major administrative affairs within the executive branch. They apply strictly to public officials and government operations rather than the general public. Examples include decrees concerning:

- Meeting allowances for committee members
- Civil service housing allowances
- Royal court petitions
- Cabinet meeting procedures and submissions 2005
- Criteria and methods for good governance 2003

Judicial Review: Any questions regarding the constitutionality or legality of Type 4 decrees fall under the jurisdiction of the Administrative Court under Section 11(2) of the Administrative Court Act.

Emergency Decrees

Unlike Royal Decrees, which are subordinate regulations, an Emergency Decree is an extraordinary legislative instrument. It holds a legal status and force equivalent to an Act of Parliament. This mechanism temporarily delegates primary legislative power to the executive branch to resolve critical crises. Upon publication in the Royal Gazette, an Emergency Decree takes effect immediately without prior parliamentary approval.

The executive cannot issue an Emergency Decree at will. Its enactment is strictly restricted by the Constitution to urgent, unavoidable scenarios:

- To maintain national security, public safety, or national economic stability.
- To avert public disasters.
- To pass urgent and confidential legislation concerning taxation or currency to protect national interests.

Because an Emergency Decree bypasses the standard legislative process, the Council of Ministers is constitutionally mandated to submit it to Parliament for ratification without delay once it takes effect:

- Approval: If Parliament approves the decree, it is ratified as permanent statutory law, maintaining its status equivalent to an Act of Parliament.
- Disapproval: If Parliament rejects the decree, it lapses and ceases to have legal effect. However, to maintain legal certainty, this expiration does not retroactively affect any actions, operations, or rights acquired while the decree was actively enforced.

== Turkey ==
In Turkey, a decree law (Turkish: Kanun Hükmünde Kararname, KHK) was a type of legislative instrument issued by the government, based on the authority granted either by a specific enabling act from the Turkish Grand National Assembly or directly from the Constitution. These decrees had the force of law in a material sense and acquired formal and organic legal power upon the approval of the Grand National Assembly. According to Article 87 of the 1982 Constitution of Turkey, the Grand National Assembly was responsible for granting the Council of Ministers the authority to issue decree laws on specific matters.

Article 91 of the Constitution also regulated the issuance of decree laws:

"The Grand National Assembly of Turkey may delegate the power to issue decree laws to the Council of Ministers. However, with the exception of martial law and states of emergency, the fundamental rights, individual rights and duties, and political rights and duties listed in the first and second sections of the second part of the Constitution cannot be regulated by decree laws."

Decree laws in Turkey were categorized into two types: ordinary and extraordinary. Ordinary decree laws were issued by the Council of Ministers and required an enabling act from the Grand National Assembly. They regulated fundamental rights, individual rights and duties, or political rights and duties. Extraordinary decree laws were issued by the Council of Ministers under the presidency of the President and did not require such an enabling act, with the power to regulate any area provided they fulfill obligations arising from international law. Decree laws were subject to both political scrutiny by the Grand National Assembly and judicial review by the Constitutional Court.

A series of constitutional amendments approved in a 2017 referendum repealed Article 91 of the Constitution. With this change, decree laws were replaced by Presidential Decrees (Turkish: Cumhurbaşkanlığı Kararnameleri, CBK) in the new presidential system.

== Ukraine ==
In Ukraine, decrees issued by the president are a major source of legal acts. Decrees are referred to as ukazy (Ukrainian: укази; sing. указ, ukaz).

== United Kingdom ==
In the United Kingdom, Orders-in-Council are either primary legislation deriving their authority from the royal prerogative, promulgated by the Privy Council in the name of the Monarch; or secondary legislation, promulgated by a minister of the Crown using the authority granted by an act of Parliament or other primary legislation. Both are subject to judicial review, the former with some exceptions.

Note: In Scotland, the word 'decree' is used for a court judgment that someone owes money (similar to a CCJ in England & Wales).

== United States ==
In US legal usage, during the 19th and early 20th centuries, a decree was an order of a court of equity determining the rights of the parties to a suit, according to equity and good conscience. Since the 1938 procedural merger of law and equity in the federal courts under the Federal Rules of Civil Procedure, the term judgment (the parallel term in the common law) has generally replaced decree. This is now true also in most state courts. The term decree is broadly treated as synonymous with judgment.

A decree is often a final determination, but there are also interlocutory decrees. A final decree fully and finally disposes of the whole litigation, determining all questions raised by the case, and it leaves nothing that requires further judicial action; it is also appealable. An interlocutory decree is a provisional or preliminary order that determines issues of fact or law in advance of a final decree, but leaves other issues to be resolved and thus does not resolve the litigation. It is usually not appealable, although preliminary injunctions by federal courts are appealable even though interlocutory.

Executive orders, which are instructions from the President to the executive branch of government, are decrees in the general sense in that they have the force of law, although they cannot override statute law or the Constitution and are subject to judicial review. Governors of individual states may also issue state executive orders.

== See also ==
- Consent decree
- Edict
- Fatwa
- Firman
- Official Communications of the Chinese Empire
  - Memorial to the throne
- Proclamation
- Rule by decree
- Rescript
- Royal charter
- Soviet Decree
