= Valery Rubakov =

Russian physicist (1955–2022)

- Валерий Рубаков
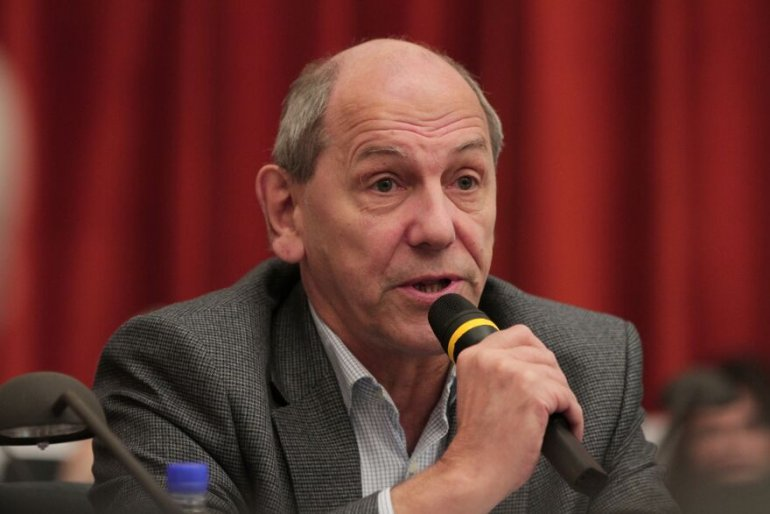
- Rubakov in 2019
- Born: Valery Anatolyevich Rubakov; 16 February 1955; Moscow, Russian SFSR, USSR
- Died: 18 October 2022 (aged 67); Sarov, Nizhny Novgorod Oblast, Russia
- Education: Moscow State University; Institute for Nuclear Research
- Awards: RAS Friedmann Prize (1999); ITEP Pomeranchuk Prize (2003); INR Markov Prize (2005); Bruno Pontecorvo Prize (2008); Heidelberg Jensen Prize (2008); KIT Wess Prize (2010); Demidov Prize (2016); Hamburger Preis für Theoretische Physik (2020)
- Scientific career
- Fields: Quantum field theory Elementary particle physics Cosmology
- Workplaces: INR; Moscow State University
- Thesis: Structure of Vacuum in Gauge Models of Quantum Field Theory (1981)
- Academic advisors: NV Krasnikov; A Tavkhelidze
- Notable students: DS Gorbunov; Đàm Thanh Sơn
- Valery Rubakov's voice Recorded 14 December 2012

Valery Anatolyevich Rubakov (Russian: Валерий Анатольевич Рубаков, 16 February 1955 – 18 October 2022) was a Russian theoretical physicist. His scientific interests included quantum field theory, elementary particle physics, and cosmology.

He was affiliated with the Institute for Nuclear Research (INR) of the Russian Academy of Sciences in Moscow.

== Education ==
Rubakov studied physics at Moscow State University, graduating in 1978. He subsequently began doctoral work at the INR, completing his thesis in 1981.

== Scientific achievements ==
Rubakov was among the best known of contemporary Russian physical theorists, notable for his studies of the cosmological effects of gauge interactions and for the development of novel ideas of space-time and gravity.

Rubakov first came to prominence for monopole catalysis of proton decay, a remarkable insight on contemporary field theory. 't Hooft and Polyakov had shown that some Grand Unified Theories predict the existence of massive magnetic monopoles. Rubakov pointed out such a monopole would induce proton decay, leaving an observable footprint in the form of electron neutrinos. The phenomenon was independently suggested by Curtis Callan and has become known as the Callan–Rubakov effect.

Together with Mikhail Shaposhnikov, Rubakov was one of the first to model spacetime and gravity using ideas from brane cosmology. Rubakov and Shaposhnikov conjectured that we live on a four-dimensional brane embedded in a higher-dimensional universe. Ordinary particles are confined in a potential well which is narrow along the additional dimensions, thereby localizing matter to the brane.

Rubakov's paper with Shaposhnikov and Vadim Kuzmin on the effect of electroweak non-conservation of baryon and lepton numbers at high temperatures is considered fundamental to modern theory about the early universe.

Rubakov was the author of a well-regarded textbook on field theory.

He served as a member of the CERN Scientific Policy Committee from 2014 to 2019 and the ICTP Scientific Council from 2010 to 2020.

== Awards ==
Rubakov was a member of the Russian Academy of Sciences since 1998. He was elected to the American Academy of Arts and Sciences in 2015.

In 1999 the Russian Academy of Sciences awarded Rubakov and Kuzmin the Friedmann Prize "for a series of works on the formation of the baryon asymmetry of the universe". He received the 2003 ITEP Pomeranchuk Prize "for pioneering contribution [sic] to developing and novel application of nonperturbative methods in field theory". In 2005 he was awarded the INR Markov Prize for fundamental physics with Mikhael Shaposhnikov. In 2008 he won the J. Hans D. Jensen Prize of the University of Heidelberg, and the Bruno Pontecorvo Prize "for his essential contributions to the study of close interrelation among particle physics, astrophysics and cosmology, and to the elaboration of a fundamentally new theory of physical space". In 2010 he received the Karlsruhe Institute of Technology Julius Wess Prize. The award was presented as part of a celebration of 50 years of teaching and research in particle physics at Karlsruhe, at which Rubakov gave a lecture entitled "Towards understanding the origin of inhomogeneities in the Universe" . In 2016 Rubakov was awarded the Demidov Prize "for fundamental theoretical contributions to the foundations of physics: quantum field theory, elementary particle physics, gravity, the theory of the early universe". In 2020 he received the Hamburg Prize for Theoretical Physics, worth €137.036.

== Personal life and death ==
In February 2022, Rubakov signed an open letter by Russian scientists condemning the 2022 Russian invasion of Ukraine.

Rubakov died on 18 October 2022, at age 67, following complications from COVID-19 that he had contracted in September. He had been in Sarov at the time of his death, lecturing.

== Publications ==
- Rubakov, V. A. (2002). Classical theory of gauge fields. Princeton, N.J.: Princeton University Press. ISBN 978-0-691-05927-3. OCLC 52243621. Rubakov, Valery (9 February 2009). 2009 pbk edition. Princeton University Press. ISBN 978-1400825097.
- Rubakov, V. A. (14 December 2010). "Towards understanding the origin of inhomogeneities in the universe" (PDF). Archived from the original (PDF) on 25 September 2018.
- Rubakov, V. A.; Gorbunov, D. S. (2011). Introduction to the Theory of the Early Universe: Hot Big Bang Theory. World Scientific Publishing Company. ISBN 978-9814343978. 2017 2nd edition. World Scientific. 29 June 2017. ISBN 9789813220058.
- Rubakov, V. A.; Gorbunov, D. S. (2011). Introduction to the Theory of the Early Universe: Cosmological Perturbations and Inflationary Theory. World Scientific Publishing Company. ISBN 978-9814343787.
