= Mikhail Shaposhnikov =

Russian theoretical physicist

Professor Mikhail Shaposhnikov
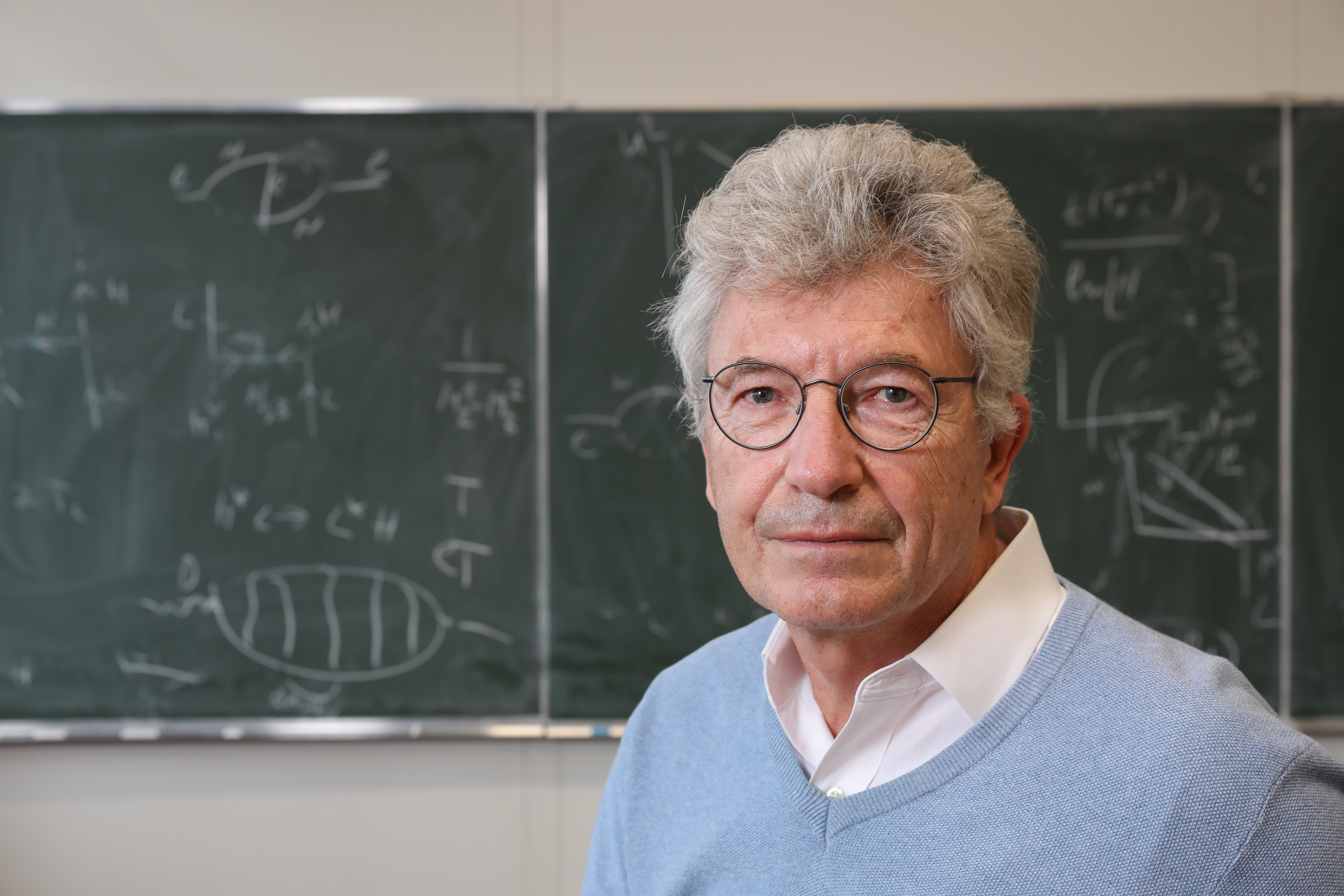
- Mikhail Shaposhnikov in 2020
- Born: 1956 (age 69–70); Sochi, Russia
- Known for: Electroweak Baryogenesis; Higgs Inflation; Brane cosmology
- Awards: Markov Prize for fundamental physics (2005); Humboldt Research Prize (2008); Andrei Sakharov gold medal (2011)

Academic background
- Education: Moscow State University

Academic work
- Discipline: Theoretical physics
- Sub-discipline: Cosmology, Particle physics, Quantum field theory
- Institutions: École Polytechnique Fédérale de Lausanne (EPFL)
- Website: https://www.epfl.ch/labs/lppc/

Mikhail Yevgenyevich Shaposhnikov (born in 1956 in Sochi, Russia) is a Soviet-born Swiss theoretical physicist and a professor at École Polytechnique Fédérale de Lausanne (EPFL). He is active in the fields of cosmology and particle physics.

== Career ==
Mikhail Shaposhnikov graduated in physics from Moscow State University in 1979 and obtained a PhD from the Institute for Nuclear Research of the Russian Academy of Sciences in 1982 after defending his thesis on the topic of baryon asymmetry of the universe in the frame of grand unified theories. From 1982 to 1991, he worked as a research scientist at the Theory Division of the Institute for Nuclear Research of the Russian Academy of Sciences in Moscow. In 1991 he moved to CERN, Geneva, where he worked as a staff member at the Theory Division. In 1998 he was appointed Professor of Theoretical Physics at the University of Lausanne, where he became director of the Institute of Theoretical Physics in 1999. In October 2003 he was named professor at EPFL. In 2011 he gave a talk New Physics without New Energy Scale at the international symposium on subnuclear physics held in Vatican City.

== Research ==
Together with Valery Rubakov, Mikhail Shaposhnikov was recognized for being the first to propose novel models of space-time and gravity using brane cosmology. In 1985, in a seminal work with Vadim Kuzmin and Valery Rubakov, he clarified the conditions under which an explanation of the baryon number violation in the Standard Model is possible.

Mikhail Shaposhnikov leads the laboratory for Particle Physics and Cosmology (LPPC) at the Institute of Physics of the School of Basic Sciences at EPFL.

== Distinctions ==
Mikhail Shaposhnikov is a recipient of the Andrei Sakharov gold medal awarded by the Russian Academy of Sciences. In 2005, he was awarded with the Markov prize for fundamental physics. In 2008, he received the Humboldt research prize awarded by the Heidelberg University.

Shaposhnikov received an Advanced Grant from the European Research Council in 2015 for the research project 'From Fermi to Planck : a bottom up approach'.

== Political positions ==
In February–March 2022, he signed two open letters by Russian scientists condemning the 2022 Russian invasion of Ukraine.

== Selected publications ==
- Kuzmin, V.A.; Rubakov, V.A.; Shaposhnikov, M.E. (1985). "On anomalous electroweak baryon-number non-conservation in the early universe". Physics Letters B. 155 (1–2): 36–42. Bibcode:1985PhLB..155...36K. doi:10.1016/0370-2693(85)91028-7.
- Bezrukov, Fedor; Shaposhnikov, Mikhail (2008). "The Standard Model Higgs boson as the inflaton". Physics Letters B. 659 (3): 703–706. arXiv:0710.3755. Bibcode:2008PhLB..659..703B. doi:10.1016/j.physletb.2007.11.072. S2CID 14818281.
- Rubakov, V.A.; Shaposhnikov, M.E. (1983). "Do we live inside a domain wall?". Physics Letters B. 125 (2–3): 136–138. Bibcode:1983PhLB..125..136R. doi:10.1016/0370-2693(83)91253-4.
- Asaka, Takehiko; Shaposhnikov, Mikhail (2005). "The νMSM, dark matter and baryon asymmetry of the universe". Physics Letters B. 620 (1–2): 17–26. arXiv:hep-ph/0505013. doi:10.1016/j.physletb.2005.06.020. S2CID 118945664.
