= Vadim Kuzmin (physicist) =

Vadim Alekseyevich Kuzmin
- Вадим Алексеевич Кузьмин
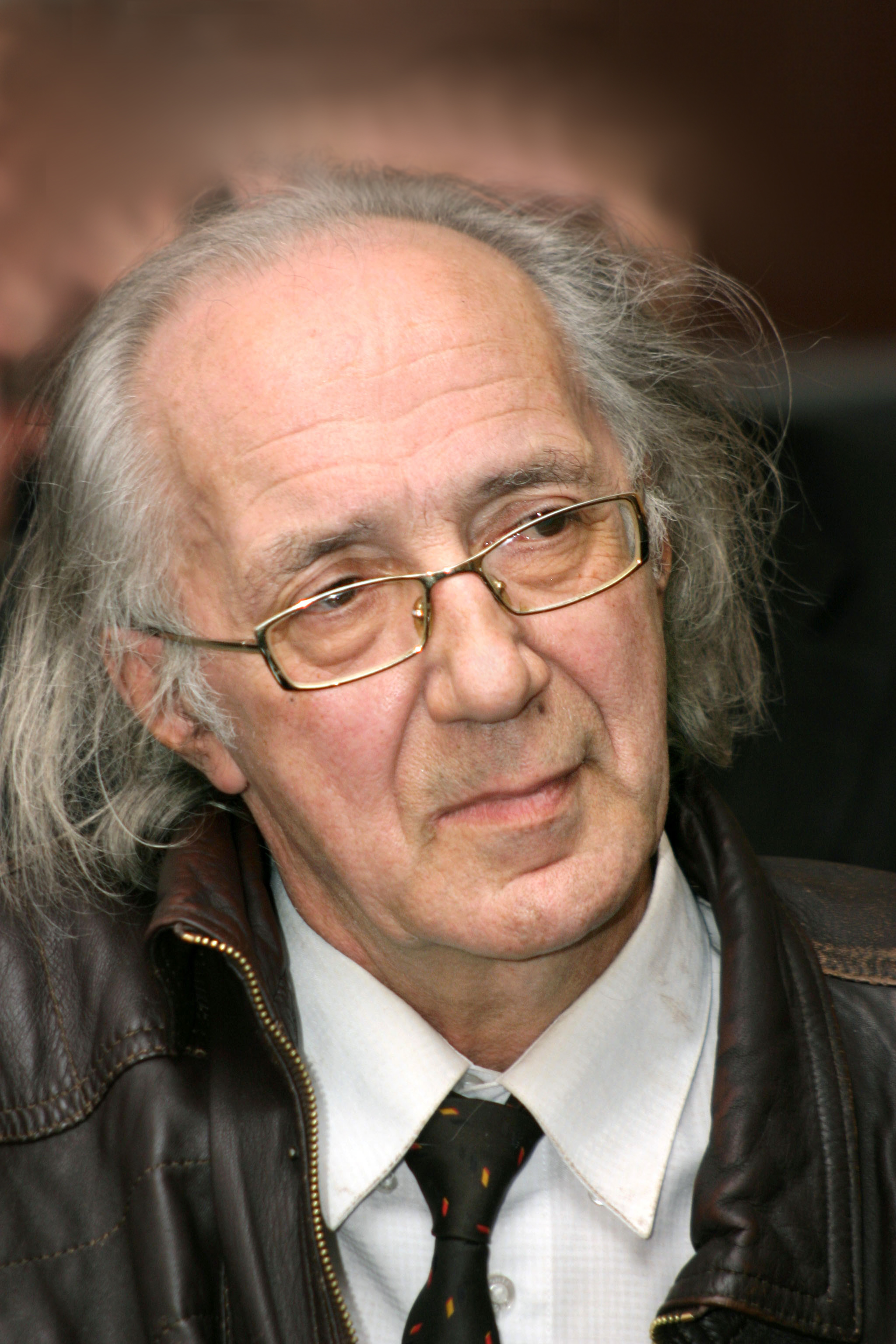
- Born: 16 April 1937; Moscow
- Died: 17 September 2015 (aged 78); Moscow
- Education: Moscow State University; Lebedev Physical Institute
- Known for: GZK limit
- Awards: RAS Friedmann Prize (1999); INR Markov Prize (2003); ITEP Pomeranchuk Prize (2006)
- Scientific career
- Institutions: Institute for Nuclear Research

Vadim Alekseyevich Kuzmin (Russian: Вади́м Алексе́евич Кузьми́н; 16 April 1937 – 17 September 2015) was a Russian theoretical physicist.

== Biography ==
Kuzmin completed his undergraduate studies in 1961 at Moscow State University and his PhD in 1971 at Lebedev Institute. He has been a member of the Institute for Nuclear Research in Moscow since its founding in 1970. There, he became a professor and chair of the department of particle astrophysics and cosmology. In 1987, he obtained the Russian doctoral title.

In 1966, he and Georgiy Zatsepin predicted (what is now called) the GZK limit for cosmic rays.

In neutrino physics, he proposed an experiment using gallium/germanium detectors to detect low-energy solar neutrinos. In 1970, he proposed neutron-antineutron oscillations as a possibility for observing violation of baryon number.

Also in 1970, he independently discovered the Sakharov conditions.

In the 1980s, he was a pioneer in the theory of electroweak baryogenesis. In 1985, his influential work with Valery Rubakov and Mikhail Shaposhnikov estimated the rate of anomalous electroweak process that violated baryon number conservation in the cosmic plasma of the early universe.

In 1999 the Russian Academy of Sciences awarded Kuzmin and Rubakov the Friedmann Prize "for a series of works on the formation of the baryon asymmetry of the universe".

In 2000, he became a corresponding member of the Russian Academy of Sciences. In 2003, he received the Institute for Nuclear Research Markov Prize for his contributions to neutrino physics. In 2006, he received the Pomeranchuk Prize "for his pioneering work on baryon-number violating processes, baryogenesis, and on the fundamental properties of high-energy cosmic rays", together with Howard Georgi.
