= Honored Employee of the Foreign Intelligence Service of the Russian Federation =

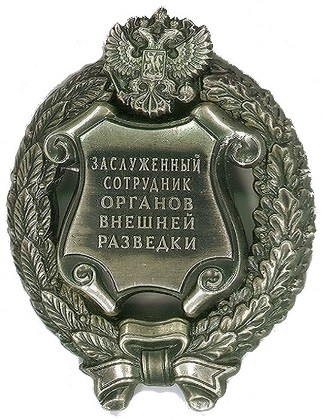
- Honored Employee of the Foreign Intelligence Service of the Russian Federation
- Type: Honorary title
- Presented by: Russian Federation
- Eligibility: Employees of the Foreign Intelligence Service
- Status: Active
- Established: 28 May 1997
- First award: 1997

Honored Employee of the Foreign Intelligence Service of the Russian Federation is an honorary title included in the system of state awards of the Russian Federation.

== Grounds for Award ==
The title "Honored Employee of the Foreign Intelligence Service of the Russian Federation" is awarded to highly professional employees of the Foreign Intelligence Service of the Russian Federation for personal merit in protecting the security of the country from external threats and training qualified personnel for the Foreign Intelligence Service of the Russian Federation.

As a rule, the honorary title "Honored Employee of the Foreign Intelligence Service of the Russian Federation" is awarded no earlier than 20 years in calendar years from the start of service in the Foreign Intelligence Service of the Russian Federation, and provided that the person nominated for the award has departmental awards (incentives) from the federal government body.

== Procedure for Awarding ==
Honorary titles of the Russian Federation are awarded by decrees of the President of the Russian Federation based on submissions made to him as a result of reviewing the petition for awarding and the proposal of the Commission under the President of the Russian Federation for State Awards.

== History of the Title ==
The honorary title "Honored Employee of the Foreign Intelligence Service of the Russian Federation" was established by Decree of the President of Russia No. 530 of May 28, 1997, "On Amendments to the Decree of the President of the Russian Federation of December 30, 1995 No. 1341 "On the Establishment of Honorary Titles of the Russian Federation, Approval of Regulations on Honorary Titles and Descriptions of the Badge for Honorary Titles of the Russian Federation"". By the same decree, the initial Regulations on the honorary title were approved, which stated:

The honorary title "Honored Employee of the Foreign Intelligence Service of the Russian Federation" is awarded to military personnel of the Foreign Intelligence Service of the Russian Federation for merit in protecting the security of the country from external threats and having served in the military for 15 years or more in calendar years.

In its current form, the Regulations on the honorary title were approved by Decree of the President of Russia No. 1099 of September 7, 2010, "On Measures to Improve the State Awards System of the Russian Federation".

== Breast Badge ==
The breast badge has a uniform shape for honorary titles of the Russian Federation and is made of silver, 40 mm high and 30 mm wide. It is in the shape of an oval wreath formed by laurel and oak branches. The crossed ends of the branches are tied with a ribbon at the bottom. At the top of the wreath is the State Coat of Arms of the Russian Federation. On the obverse, in the central part, a cartouche is superimposed on the wreath with the inscription — the name of the honorary title.

On the reverse side, there is a pin for attaching the breast badge to clothing. The breast badge is worn on the right side of the chest.

== Reading list ==
- Shchegolev, K. A. (2009). Modern Awards of Russia. Traditions and Continuity. History of Awards. M.: Veche. p. 368. ISBN 978-5-9533-3696-3.
- Vinokurov, V. A. (2012). The System of State Awards of the Russian Federation: History, Modernity and Development Prospects. M.: Delo. p. 243. ISBN 978-5-7749-0725-0.
- Goncharov, A. I. (2010). The Award System of the Russian Federation. M.: Posev. p. 254.
