= Viktor Matveev =

Russian physicist (born 1941)

Viktor Anatolievich Matveev
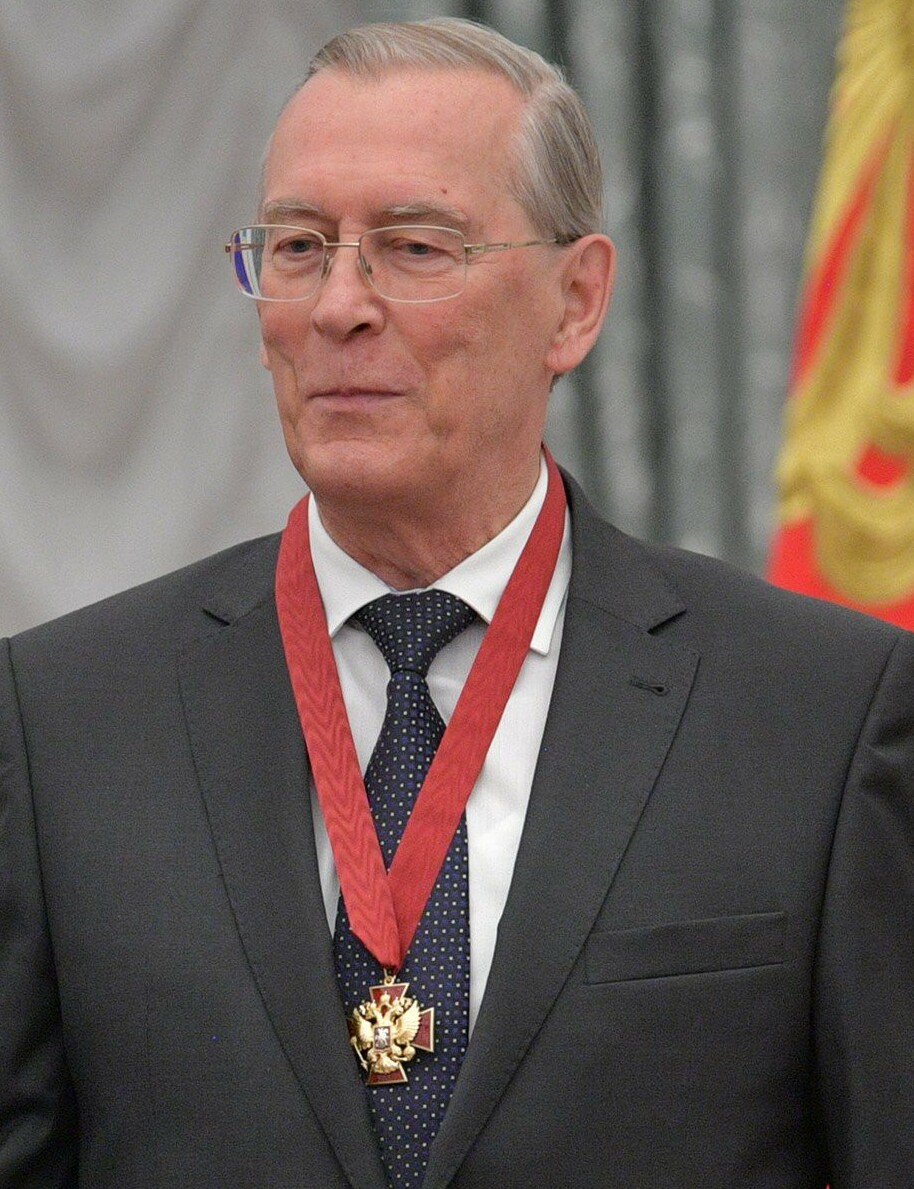
- Victor Matveyev at award ceremonies 27 Jun 2018, Kremlin, Moscow.
- Born: Viktor Anatolievich Matveev; 11 November 1941 (age 84); Taiga Village, Krasnoyarsk Krai, Russia
- Citizenship: Russia; Russian Soviet Federative Socialist Republic
- Education: Far Eastern Federal University; Leningrad State University
- Awards: Lenin Prize(1988), State Prize of the Russian Federation(1998),(2000), Order "For Merit to the Fatherland"(IV degree, III degree), Order of Honour (1999); Honorary Citizen of Troitsk (2001); Honorary Doctorate at University of Bucharest(2018)
- Scientific career
- Fields: Particle physics, Theoretical Physics Mathematical Physics, Quantum field theory, High energy physics
- Workplaces: Joint Institute for Nuclear Research and Moscow State University; Institute for Nuclear Research; Fermilab
- Doctoral advisor: Nikolay Bogolyubov, Albert Tavkhelidze

Viktor Anatolievich Matveev (Russian: Ви́ктор Анато́льевич Матве́ев; 11 December 1941) is a Russian theoretical physicist, director of the Joint Institute for Nuclear Research (2012-2020) and member of the Russian Academy of Sciences who has made fundamental contributions to areas of Particle physics, Theoretical Physics Mathematical Physics, Quantum field theory and High energy physics.
