= Mu2e =

Particle physics experiment

Mu2e project logo

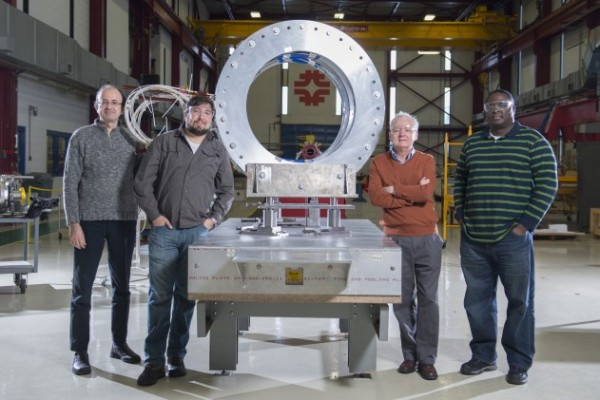
A prototype of the Mu2e Transport Solenoid module

Mu2e, or the Muon-to-Electron Conversion Experiment, is a particle physics experiment at Fermilab in the US. The goal of the experiment is to identify physics beyond the Standard Model, namely, the conversion of muons to electrons without the emission of neutrinos, which occurs in a number of theoretical models. Former project co-spokesperson Jim Miller likens this process to neutrino oscillation, but for charged leptons. The rate for this process in the Standard Model of particle physics is unobservably small, so any observation of this process would constitute a major discovery and indicate new physics beyond the standard model. The experiment will be 10,000 times more sensitive than previous muon to electron conversion experiments, and probe effective energy scales up to 10,000 TeV.

== Timeline ==
=== Prior work ===
Physicists have been searching for flavor violation since the 1940s. Flavor violation among neutrinos was proven in 1998 at the Super-Kamiokande experiment in Japan.

In 1989, Russian physicists Vladimir Lobashev and Rashid Djilkibaev proposed an experiment to search for lepton flavor violation. The experiment, called MELC, operated from 1992 to 1995 at the Moscow Meson Factory at the Institute for Nuclear Research in Russia, before being shut down due to the political and economic crises of the time.

In 1997, American physicist William Molzon proposed a similar experiment at Brookhaven National Laboratory. Research and development on the MECO experiment began in 2001, but funding was pulled in 2005.

=== Development ===
Mu2e is based on the MECO experiment proposed at Brookhaven, and the earlier MELC experiment at Russia's Institute for Nuclear Research. Research and development for the Mu2e experiment began in 2009, with the conceptual design complete in mid-2011. In July 2012, Mu2e received Critical Decision 1 approval (the second of five critical decision levels) from the Department of Energy, about one month after initial review. Project Manager Ron Ray asserted, "I know of no other project that has received sign-off that quickly after review." Funding of the Mu2e experiment was recommended by the Department of Energy's Particle Physics Project Prioritization Panel, in its 2014 report.

=== Construction and operation ===
Groundbreaking on the detector hall took place on April 18, 2015. Originally, commissioning was anticipated in 2019 and preliminary results were expected 2020; however, the project was significantly delayed, and, in 2022, the experiment was projected to begin in 2026. The delivery of two magnets from General Atomics was delayed, contributing to the shift in start-date. The experiment is expected to run for three years.

Later improvements to the detector may increase the sensitivity of the experiment by one to two orders of magnitude, allowing a more in-depth study of any charged lepton conversion that may be discovered in the initial run.

As of February 2024, two Mu2E transport solenoids had been constructed and moved from Fermilab's Heavy Assembly Building to the detector hall, where final assembly will be completed.

== Design ==
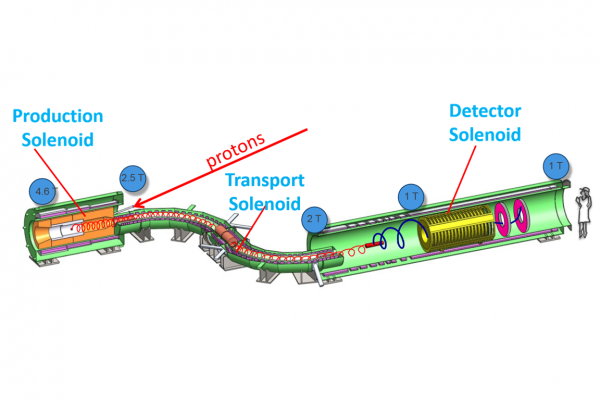
Stages of the Mu2e experiment

The Mu2e apparatus will be 92 feet (28 m) in length, and will consist of three sections. The total cost of the experiment is $271 million.

=== Muon production ===
Repurposed elements from the Tevatron collider will be used to generate and deliver an 8 GeV proton beam. The protons will be extracted from Fermilab's Delivery Ring through a non-linear third-integer resonance extraction process and sent in pulses to the tungsten target. These protons will then collide with the tungsten production target in the production solenoid, producing a cascade of particles including pions, which decay into muons. Mu2e will produce between 200 and 500 quadrillion (2×10^{17} to 5×10^{17}) muons per year. For every 300 protons hitting the production target, about one muon will enter the transport solenoid.

=== Transport ===
The 4.5-tesla magnetic field of a production solenoid will direct some of the particles produced into an S-shaped 2-tesla evacuated transport solenoid, consisting of 50 separate superconducting electromagnets, which will select muons by charge and momentum, and carry the desired slow muons to the detector after some time delay.

=== Detection ===
On entering the detector solenoid, the muons will hit (and stop within) an aluminum target that is about 0.2 mm thick, entering orbitals around nuclei within the target. Any muons which convert into electrons without emitting neutrinos will escape these orbitals and enter the detector with a characteristic energy of 104.97 MeV (which is the muon mass minus the binding energy of about 0.5 MeV and nuclear recoil energy of about 0.2 MeV).

The detector itself consists of two main components: a straw tracker to measure the momentum of outgoing particles; and an electromagnetic calorimeter to identify which particle interactions to record for further study, identify what type of particle passed through the tracker, and to confirm the measurements of the tracker. An electron with energy of around 105 MeV will indicate that the electron originated in a neutrinoless muon conversion.

In order to disturb the path of the electrons as little as possible, the tracker uses as little material as possible. The wire chamber tracker consists of panels of 15-micron-thick straws of metalized mylar filled with argon and carbon dioxide, the thinnest such straws ever used in a particle physics experiment. Electronics at each end of the straws will record the signal produced when electrons interact with the gas in the straw, allowing the trajectory of the electrons to be reconstructed.

==== Sensitivity ====
The rate of neutrinoless conversion of muons to electrons was previously constrained by the MEG experiment to less than 2.4×10^{−12}, and further constrained to 7×10^{−13} by the SINDRUM II experiment at the Paul Scherrer Institute in Switzerland. Mu2e has an expected sensitivity of 5×10^{−17}, four orders of magnitude beyond SINDRUM II, meaning that it will see a signal if as few as one in 100 quadrillion muons transforms into an electron.

== Collaboration ==
As of October 2018, the Mu2e collaboration included 240 people from 40 institutions in six countries. The collaboration is led by co-spokespersons Bob Bernstein (Fermilab) and Stefano Miscetti (INFN Frascati). The project manager for Mu2e is Julie Whitmore; the deputy project managers are Karen Byrum and Paul Derwent.

== See also ==
- Comet Experiment
