= Lenin Prize =

Highest Soviet state award

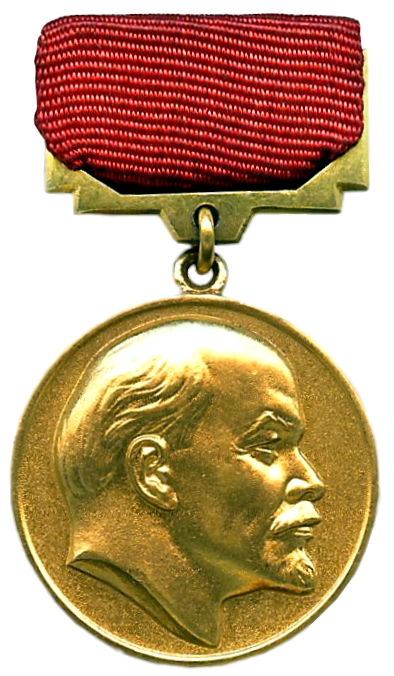
- Lenin Prize badge
- Country: Soviet Union, Russia
- Status: Reintroduced in 2018 (Ulyanovsk Oblast only)
- Established: 23 June 1925
- Ribbon of the prize

Precedence
- Next (lower): USSR State Prize

The Lenin Prize (Russian: Ленинская премия, romanized: Leninskaya premiya) was one of the most prestigious awards of the Soviet Union for accomplishments relating to science, literature, arts, architecture, and technology. It was originally created on June 23, 1925, and awarded until 1934. During the period from 1935 to 1956, the Lenin Prize was not awarded, being replaced largely by the Stalin Prize. On August 15, 1956, it was reestablished, and continued to be awarded on every even-numbered year until 1990. The award ceremony was April 22, Vladimir Lenin's birthday. The Lenin Prize is different from the Lenin Peace Prize, which was awarded to foreign citizens rather than to citizens of the Soviet Union, for their contributions to the peace cause. Also, the Lenin Prize should not be confused with the Stalin Prize or the later USSR State Prize. Some persons were awarded both the Lenin Prize and the USSR State Prize.

== History ==
On June 23, 1925, by decree of the Central Committee of the All-Union Communist Party (Bolsheviks) and the Council of People's Commissars, the V. I. Lenin Prizes were established. From 1926 to 1935, they were awarded for scientific work "in order to encourage scientific activity in the direction closest to the ideas of V. I. Lenin, namely, in the direction of a close connection between science and life."

In 1935, the Lenin Prizes ceased to be awarded, and in 1940, Stalin Prize began to be awarded (until 1955).

On August 15, 1956, the Central Committee of the CPSU and the Council of Ministers of the Soviet Union adopted a joint resolution to reinstate the Lenin Prizes and award them annually on Lenin's birthday, April 22. In 1957, the awarding of Lenin Prizes was reinstated for outstanding scientific works, architectural and technical structures, inventions implemented in the national economy, technological processes, etc.; Lenin Prizes were also established for outstanding works of literature and art. In March 1960, Lenin Prizes in journalism and publicism were established.

Beginning in 1957, Lenin Prizes were awarded annually on Lenin's birthday (with the exception of 1958 and 1966), and from 1967, every two years, in even years. The so-called "closed" or "secret" Lenin Prizes (primarily for work related to national defense; awarding decisions were not published). In these cases, the "once every two years" rule may not apply (see list of laureates).

Originally, 42 prizes were awarded. From 1961, according to regulations, up to 76 prizes could be awarded annually. Of these, up to 60 were awarded by the Committee on Lenin Prizes in Science and Technology and up to 16 by the Committee on Lenin Prizes in Science and Art under the Council of Ministers of the USSR. In 1967, this number of prizes was reduced to 30. Laureates received a diploma, a gold medal, and a cash prize of 7,500 Soviet rubles.

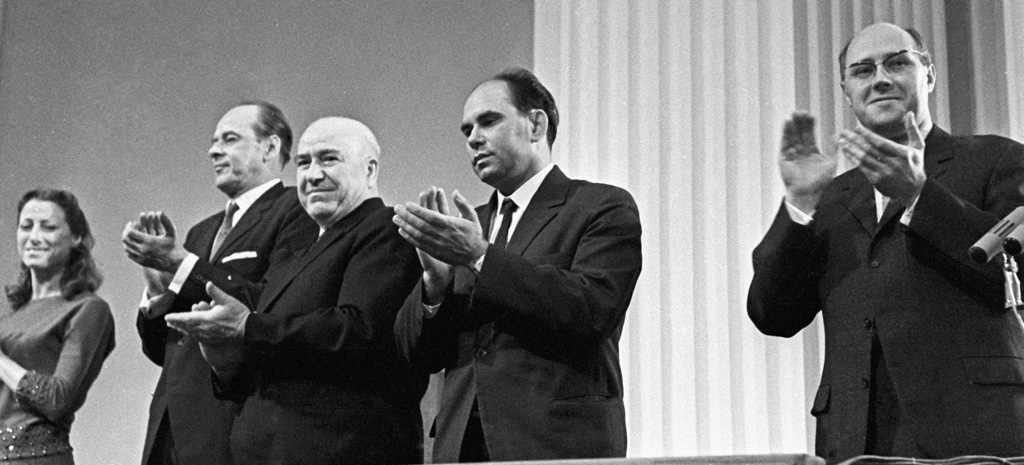
Lenin Prize winners Maya Plisetskaya, Nikolai Cherkasov, Alexander Deineka, Vasily Peskov and Mstislav Rostropovich, 1964.

Between 1956 and 1967, the Lenin Prize was the only state prize of the highest level, so the number of laureates was high. In 1967, the USSR State Prize was established, which was considered less prestigious, thereby elevating the status of the Lenin Prize. The Stalin Prize diplomas awarded from 1941 to 1953 were replaced with corresponding USSR State Prize diplomas.

According to the joint resolution of the Central Committee of the CPSU and the Council of Ministers of the USSR of September 9, 1966, 30 Lenin Prizes were awarded biennially (including 25 in science and technology, and 5 in literature, art, and architecture). In 1970, an additional prize for children's works of literature and art was established (Resolution of the Central Committee of the CPSU and the Council of Ministers of the USSR of March 26, 1969[4]).

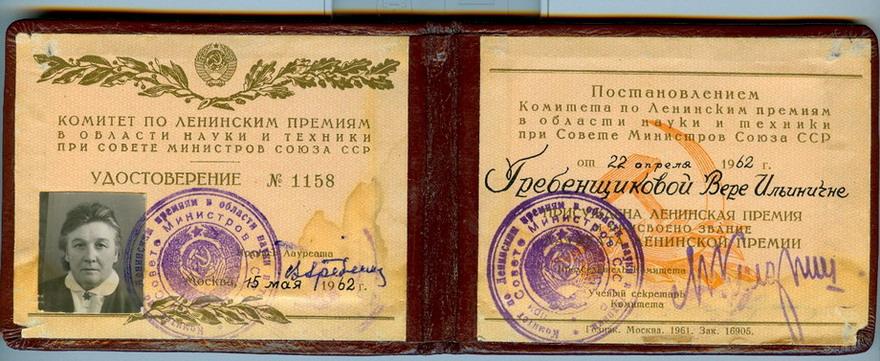
Certificate of Lenin Prize laureate Vera Grebenshchikova, 1962

The regulations governing the Lenin Prizes were approved by the Central Committee of the CPSU and the Council of Ministers of the USSR on February 17, 1967. The Regulation defined the circle of state, public and scientific organizations that were granted the right to nominate works for the Lenin Prize: the Presidium of the USSR Academy of Sciences and the academies of sciences of the union republics, the USSR Academy of Medical Sciences, the All-Union Lenin Academy of Agricultural Sciences, the USSR Academy of Pedagogical Sciences, scientific and engineering societies, boards of ministries of the USSR and union republics, state committees of the Council of Ministers of the USSR and union republics, committees under the Council of Ministers of the USSR, the Presidium of the All-Union Central Council of Trade Unions, the Central Committee of the All-Union Leninist Young Communist League, the boards of the unions of writers, artists, composers, architects, filmmakers and journalists of the USSR, the Presidium of the Academy of Arts of the USSR, republican theatrical societies, research, design and planning organizations, publishing houses, editorial boards of newspapers and magazines, meetings of the staff of enterprises, institutions and organizations. Scientific works, literary works, works of art and architecture, published (publicly performed, constructed) no later than 1 year before the established deadline for submitting nominations, and works in the field of technology and production - after their introduction into the national economy, could be nominated for the Lenin Prize.

On April 23, 2018, the Governor of Ulyanovsk Oblast, Sergey Morozov, reintroduced the Lenin Prize for achievements in the humanities, literature, and art to coincide with the 150th birthday of Lenin in 2020.

== Awardee ==
Note: This list is incomplete, short, and differs in detail from the complete and much longer Russian list, and is in chronological order. (See Russian Wikipedia.)

- Nikolai Kravkov (1926, Medicine)
- Aleksandr Chernyshyov (1930, radio engineering)
- Nikolay Demyanov (1930, chemistry)
- Sergei Sergeyev-Tsensky (1955, writer)
- Andrei Sakharov (1956, physics)
- Giorgi Melikishvili (1957, Historian)
- Dmitry Nalivkin (1957, geology)
- Dmitry Okhotsimsky (1957, space science)
- Pyotr Novikov (1957, mathematics, for proving the undecidability of the word problem for groups)
- Sergei Prokofiev (1957, music, posthumously, for his Symphony No. 7)
- Dmitri Shostakovich (1958, music composition)
- Nikolay Bogolyubov (1958, physics)
- Mikhail Leontovich (1958, physics)
- Mikhail Shumayev (1958, physics)
- Grigory Chukhray (1959, contribution to the arts - Ballad of a Soldier)
- Vladimir Veksler (1959, physics)
- Mikhail Sholokhov (1960, literature, for And Quiet Flows the Don)
- Aleksandr Bereznyak (1961, for P-15 missile)
- Sviatoslav Richter (1961, pianist)
- Juhan Smuul (1961, literature)
- Aleksei Pogorelov (1962, mathematics)
- Korney Chukovsky (1962, for his book, Mastery of Nekrasov)
- Nikolai Nevsky (1962, for his posthumous book Tangut Philology)
- Volodymyr Marchenko (1962, mathematics)
- Chinghiz Aitmatov (Чингиз Айтматов, 1963, literature)
- Hanon Izakson (Ханон Ильич Изаксон, 1964, farm machinery)
- Mikhail Kalashnikov (Михаи́л Тимофе́евич Кала́шников, 1964, AK-47 assault rifle)
- Vladimir Kotelnikov, 1964, (Sampling Theory)
- Innokenty Smoktunovsky (Иннокентий Смоктуновский, 1965, acting)
- Vladimir Igorevich Arnol'd, Andrey Nikolaevich Kolmogorov (Влади́мир И́горевич Арно́льд, Ленинская премия, 1965, mathematics)
- Alexander Sergeevich Davydov (1966, physics)
- Alexei Alexeyevich Abrikosov (Алексей Алексеевич Абрикосов, 1966, physics)
- Alexander Sergeevich Davydov (1966, physics)
- Antonina Fedorovna Prikhot'ko (1966, physics)
- Emmanuel Rashba (Эммануил Иосифович Рашба, 1966, physics)
- Vladimir L'vovich Broude (1966, Physics)
- Igor Grekhov (1966, Semiconductor Technology)
- Mikhail Kim (1966, hydraulic engineering)
- Igor Moiseyev (Игорь Моисеев, 1967, dance)
- Ilya Lifshitz (1967, physics)
- Mikhail Svetlov (Михаил Светлов, 1967, poetry, posthumously, for the book Verses of the Last Years)
- Valery Panov (1969, dance)
- Yevgeny Vuchetich (Евгений (Eugene) Вучетич, 1970, sculpture)
- Yuri Nikolaevich Denisyuk (1970, holography)
- Agniya Barto (Агния Львовна Барто, 1972, poetry?)
- Yuri Ozerov (director) for his work Liberation (film series), 1972
- Yuri Bondarev writer, for his work Liberation (film series), 1972
- Igor Slabnevich Cinematographer for his work Liberation (film series), 1972
- Alexander Myagkhov Art Director for his work Liberation (film series), 1972
- Konstantin Simonov (Константин Симонов, 1974, poetry)
- Vladimir Lobashev (1974, physics)
- Mikhail Simonov (Михаил Симонов, 1976, aircraft designer)
- Gavriil Ilizarov (1979, medicine)
- Anatol Zhabotinsky (Oscillating chemical reactions, 1980)
- Boris Pavlovich Belousov (Oscillating chemical reactions, 1980)
- Otar Taktakishvili (1982, music composition)
- Boris Babaian (Борис Арташеcович Бабаян, 1987 for Elbrus-2 supercomputer)
- Vladimir Teplyakov (1988, for the development of the RFQ)
- Eugene D. Shchukin (1988, physical-chemical mechanics)
- Kaisyn Kuliev (Кулиев Кайсын Шуваевич, 1990, Man.Bird.Tree. Poetry. Post-mortem)
- Alykul Osmonov (Алыкул Осмонов, Kyrgyz poet and literary modernizer)
- Irena Sedlecká (Sculpture)
- Olga Avilova (Surgeon)
- Yekaterina Alexandrovna Ankinovich (Geologist)
- Natalia Shpiller (1951, opera singer)

== Lenin Prize winners in Science ==
=== Nuclear Physics ===
1988 year

- Rudolf M. Muradyan

For a series of innovative works “New quantum number – color and establishment of dynamical regularities in the quark structure of elementary particles and atomic nuclei” published during 1965 – 1977.

=== Kurchatov Institute of Atomic Energy ===
1958 year

- Alexander M. Andrianov
- Lev Andreevich Artsimovich (Лев Андреевич Арцимович)
- Olga A. Bazilevskaya
- Stanislav I. Braginskiy
- Igor' N. Golovin
- Mikhail A. Leontovich
- Stepan Yu. Lukyanov
- Samuil M. Osovets
- Vasiliy I. Sinitsin
- Nikolay V. Filippov
- Natan A. Yavlinskiy

For research of powerful pulse discharges in gas for production of the high-temperature plasma, published in years.

1964 year

- Aleksandr Emmanuilovich Nudel'man (Александр Эммануилович Нудельман)

For a series of innovative automatic cannons.

1966 year

- Yuri Raizer

1972 year

- Vsevolod A. Belyaev
- Oleg Borisovich Firsov (Олег Борисович Фирсов)

For a series of work "Elementary processes and non-elastic scattering at nuclear collisions”.

- Vadim I. Utkin

1978 year Vladilen S. Letokhov and Veniamin P. Chebotayev

1982 year

- Viktor V. Orlov

For the work on fast neutron reactors.

1984 year

- Valentin F. Demichev

For production of special chemical compounds and development of conditions of their application.

1984 year

- Boris B. Kadomtsev
- Oleg P. Pogutse
- Vitaliy D. Shafranov

For a series of work "The theory of thermonuclear toroidal plasma".

=== Mathematics ===
1976 year

- Nikolai Krasovski
- Alexander B. Kurzhanski
- Yury Osipov
- A. Subbotin

=== Physiology ===
1965 year

- Sergei S. Bryukhonenko (posthumously)

== Lenin Prize winners in Technology ==
=== Aircraft construction ===
For his work on Advanced Rocket and Aircraft propulsion systems, Sergei Tumansky was awarded the prize in 1957

For their work on the MiG 25 Heavy Interceptor:

- R A Belyakov, General designer
- N Z Matyuk, chief project engineer
- I S Silayev, Gorkii aircraft factory director (later Minister of Aircraft Industry)
- F Shukhov, engine project chief
- F Volkov, radar project chief
- A V Minayev, Deputy Minister of Aircraft Industry who headed task force 'Det 63' that was sent to Egypt in 1971.

=== Other ===
- Nadezhda A. Agaltsova

== See also ==
- List of general science and technology awards
