= Mikhail Shumayev =

Soviet physicist

Mikhail Petrovich Shumayev (22 April 1924 – 5 February 1995) was a Soviet nuclear physicist, engineer and chemist. He was a co-developer of the RDS-37, the Soviet Union's first two-stage thermonuclear bomb.

He was born in Bol'shiye Alabukhi, Gribanovsky District, Voronezh Oblast. He left high school in 1941 and worked on a farm collective. From 1942, he fought on the Eastern Front (World War II) and was involved in the defence of Stalingrad. He was discharged after being wounded in February 1943.

Between 1944 and 1945, he studied at the Ivanovo Institute of Chemical Technology before transferring to Moscow State University to study physics, graduating with honours in 1950. He was sent to KB-11, now the All-Russian Scientific Research Institute of Experimental Physics in the closed city of Sarov, Nizhny Novgorod region, where he worked as a senior engineer on thermonuclear weapons in Igor Tamm's group. This group developed, tested and improved megatonne-yield thermonuclear weapons. In 1955, he transferred to the Scientific Research Institute-1011. Later, his working group developed nuclear charges for an aerial bomb, the R-13 rocket and the X-20M cruise missile. For this work in equipping bombs and missile systems, he and his colleagues received the Lenin Prize in addition to other state awards for their involvement in the development of his country's nuclear defences. He wrote a further degree thesis in 1960 and was awarded a Ph.D. in 1968. Later he became head of the theoretical department of the 1011 group, a role he remained in until 1990, when he became a chief researcher. He trained many scientists and was part of the committees and commissions which awarded state prizes, degrees and titles related to his areas of expertise. He retired in August 1991.

He died in Obninsk, Kaluga Oblast.

== Awards ==
- 1953: Medal "For Labour Valour" & Stalin Prize 2nd Degree.
- 1958: Lenin Prize.
- 1956, 1975, 1981: Order of Lenin.
- 1976: Order of the October Revolution.
- 1971: Hero of Socialist Labour.
- 1985: Order of the Patriotic War 2nd Degree.
