= Mu3e =

Mu3e is a particle physics experiment at the Paul Scherrer Institute, searching for decays of anti-muons (Mu) to an electron and two positrons (3e). This decay is extremely unlikely in the Standard Model of particle physics, as it changes the lepton number. Several new theories, especially supersymmetric ones, predict a much more frequent decay. Searching for this decay allows a test of these theories, even if they cannot be tested directly in other experiments like at the LHC. It has also been shown the experiment is sensitive to probe new light dark sector particles such as dark photon.

Mu3e is constructed at the Paul Scherrer Institute. It is planned to create the world's most intense muon beam which will allow to analyze two billion decays per second. This rate is necessary to study more than 10^{16} muon decays in total. Important backgrounds are the decays $\mu^+ \to e^+e^-e^+\bar{\nu_\mu}\nu_e$ and $\mu^+ \to e^+\bar{\nu_\mu}\nu_e$. To distinguish between signal and background, the detector has a spatial resolution better than 200 μm, a time resolution better than 100 ps and an energy resolution better than 0.5 MeV for the individual electrons. To minimize multiple scattering, the detector is built as light as possible. Semiconductor detectors are used for the spatial and energy resolution, scintillator fibers provide a good timing resolution. The whole experiment is in a magnetic field of 1 tesla to determine the energy of the particles based on their curvature radius.

Data taking of Phase I of the experiment is expected to begin in 2026. The full rate of two billion muons per second will not be reached before 2029 after the High-Intensity Muon Beam (HIMB) upgrade.

The experiment is expected to either find the decay or to set an upper limit of 10^{−16} on the branching fraction, a factor 10,000 better than previous experiments.

== See also ==
- Mu to E Gamma
- Mu2e
