= Friedmann Prize =

The Friedmann Prize is a Soviet and Russian physics prize, awarded for outstanding work in cosmology and gravity, as well as earth sciences. It is named after the Russian cosmologist Alexander Alexandrovich Friedmann.

Between 1972 and 1990 the prize was awarded by the USSR Academy of Sciences for the best scientific work in the field of meteorology. It was re-established by the Russian Academy of Sciences in 1993. It is generally awarded to a single scientist once every three years.

== Recipients ==
Year	Winner	Recognition
1972	Ilya Afanasievich Kibel	For his monograph "Introduction to the hydrodynamic methods of short-term weather forecasting" (published in 1957) and a series of works on dynamic meteorology published in 1958-1970
1975	Gury Marchuk	For a series of works in the field of hydrodynamic methods of weather forecasting and physics of atmospheric processes
1978	Yekaterina Nikitichna Blinova	For the series of works: "Dynamics of atmospheric motions at planetary scale: the hydrodynamic long-term weather forecast and the theory of climate"
1981	Mikhel Aizikovich Yudin	For a series of works on hydrodynamic and statistical methods for forecasting meteorological fields
1984	Alexander Obukhov	For a series of works on large-scale atmospheric dynamics
1990	Georgy Golitsyn	For a series of studies on general atmospheric circulation and convection
1993	Dymnikov, Valentin Pavlovich	For a series of papers on the theory of large-scale atmospheric processes and climate theory
1993	Andrei Monin	For a series of papers on the theory of large-scale atmospheric processes and climate theory
1993	Aleksandr Nikolayevich Filatov	For a series of papers on the theory of large-scale atmospheric processes and climate theory
1996	Alexei Starobinsky	For a series of papers on the theory of the Deutter (inflation) stage in the early universe and its observational manifestations
1999	Valery Rubakov	For the series of works: "Formation of the baryon asymmetry of the universe"
1999	Vadim Kuzmin	For the series of works: "Formation of the baryon asymmetry of the universe"
2002	Rashid Sunyaev	For a series of works: "The effect of reducing the brightness of the background radiation in the direction of galaxy clusters"
2002	Yakov Borisovich Zel'dovich	For a series of works: "The effect of reducing the brightness of the background radiation in the direction of galaxy clusters"
2005	Kirill Zybin	For the series of works: "Nonlinear theory of gravitational instability of a dissipationless cold matter and formation of a large-scale structure of the universe"
2005	Aleksandr Gurevich	For the series of works: "Nonlinear theory of gravitational instability of a dissipationless cold matter and formation of a large-scale structure of the universe"
2008	Vladimir Nikolayevich Lukash	For the series of works: "The creation of density perturbations in the Friedmann universe"
2011	Alexander Dmitrievich Dolgov	For the series of works: "Application of methods of quantum field theory and elementary particle physics in cosmology"
2014	Igor Dmitriyevich Novikov	For a series of works on the analysis of processes in the expanding universe, the determination of the parameters of quasars and the physics of black holes
2017	Igor Ivanovich Tkachev	For the series of works: "New directions in the cosmology of the early and modern universe"
2017	Andrey Olegovich Barvinsky	For the series of works: "New directions in the cosmology of the early and modern universe"
2017	Aleksandr Yuryevich Kamenshik	For the series of works: "New directions in the cosmology of the early and modern universe"
2020	Vladimir Gdalevich Kurt	for the cycle of works "Recombination of hydrogen in the hot model of the Universe"

== See also ==
- List of astronomy awards
- List of meteorology awards
- List of physics awards
