= Mu to E Gamma =

Particle physics experiment in muon decay

The Mu to E Gamma (MEG) is a particle physics experiment dedicated to measuring the decay of the muon into an electron and a photon, a decay mode which is heavily suppressed in the Standard Model by lepton flavour conservation, but enhanced in supersymmetry and grand unified theories. It is located at the Paul Scherrer Institute and began taking data September 2008.

== MEG Results ==
In May 2016 the MEG experiment published the world's leading upper limit on the branching ratio of this decay:

$$\Beta ( \mu^+ \to e^+ \gamma) < 4.2 \times 10^{-13}$$

at 90% confidence level, based on data collected in 2009–2013. This improved the MEG limit from the prior MEGA experiment by a factor of about 28.

== MEG II Result ==
The MEG collaboration presented an upgrade plan for the MEG II experiment in 2014, and data taking begun in 2021 after significant detector and electronics upgrades.

In October 2025 the MEG II collaboration published the latest result using data from 2021 and 2022.

Combined with the MEG result, this yields in a new upper limit on the branching ratio of

$$\Beta ( \mu^+ \to e^+ \gamma) < 1.5 \times 10^{-13}$$

More data being taken in 2023-2026 with much higher statistics will result in an even better limit to be published in the future.

== Apparatus ==
MEG and MEG II uses a continuous muon beam (3 × 10^{7}/s) incident on a plastic target. The experiment searches for a back-to-back positron and monochromatic photon (52.8 MeV). A liquid xenon scintillator with photomultiplier tubes measure the photon energy, and a drift chamber in a magnetic field detects the positrons. All detectors are read out by the MIDAS DAQ system.

More experiments are planned to explore rare muon transitions, such as Comet (experiment), Mu2e and Mu3e.
