= Vladimir Lobashev =

Russian particle physicist

- Born: Vladimir Mikhailovich Lobashev; July 29, 1934; Leningrad, RSFSR, Soviet Union
- Died: August 3, 2011 (aged 77)
- Education: Saint Petersburg State University
- Known for: P and CP invariance; neutron and neutrino physics
- Awards: Lenin Prize 1974; Order of the Red Banner of Labour 1984; Bruno Pontecorvo Prize 1998
- Scientific career
- Fields: Nuclear physics, particle physics
- Institutions: Ioffe Institute, Saint Petersburg Institute of Nuclear Physics, Institute for Nuclear Research

Vladimir Mikhailovich Lobashev (Russian: Владимир Михайлович Лобашёв; July 29, 1934 – August 3, 2011) was a Soviet and Russian physicist and expert in nuclear physics and particle physics. He authored over 200 papers, of which 25 were considered groundbreaking.

== Early life and education ==
Lobashev was born in Leningrad. His father, Mikhail Yefimovich Lobashev, was a professor of physiology and genetics and head of the Department of Genetics at Leningrad State University.

Vladimir Lobashev graduated high school in 1952 with a silver medal. He earned a degree in physics at Leningrad State University in 1957. He defended his graduate thesis in 1963, and his doctoral thesis on the non-conservation of spatial parity in the gamma decay of nuclei in 1968.

== Career ==
From 1957 to 1971, Lobashev worked as a laboratory assistant and as head of the Ioffe Physical-Technical Institute in Leningrad, collaborating also with the Leningrad Institute of Nuclear Physics.

In 1972, Lobashev became head of the Department of Experimental Physics at the Institute for Nuclear Research in Moscow.

In 1970, he was elected a corresponding member of the Academy of Sciences of the Soviet Union. He was awarded full membership in 2003.

== Research ==
Lobashev's main areas of research were in P and CP invariance, and neutron and neutrino physics. He discovered a new effect in quantum electrodynamics, the rotation of the plane of polarization of gamma rays in the medium of polarized electrons. His work on small effects of the non-conservation of spatial parity contributed to proving the universality of the weak interaction, and earned Lobashev the Lenin Prize in 1974.

Lobashev found the most accurate limit then known on the electric dipole moment of the neutron, critical to the interpretation of CP violation. In experiments with polarized thermal neutrons, Lobashev demonstrated left-right asymmetry of fission neutron capture.

With P.E. Spivakom, Lobashev proposed a new method for measuring the mass of the neutrino; this experiment placed a new lower limit on the mass of the electron antineutrino.

Lobashev, along with physicist Rashid Djilkibaev, proposed the MELC experiment to search for lepton flavor violation, which influenced the later Mu2e experiment at Fermilab in the US.

Lobashev was awarded the Order of the Red Banner of Labour in 1984, the Bruno Pontecorvo Prize in 1998, the Markov prize in 2004, and the Alexander von Humboldt Senior Researcher Award.
