= Order of the Government of Russia =

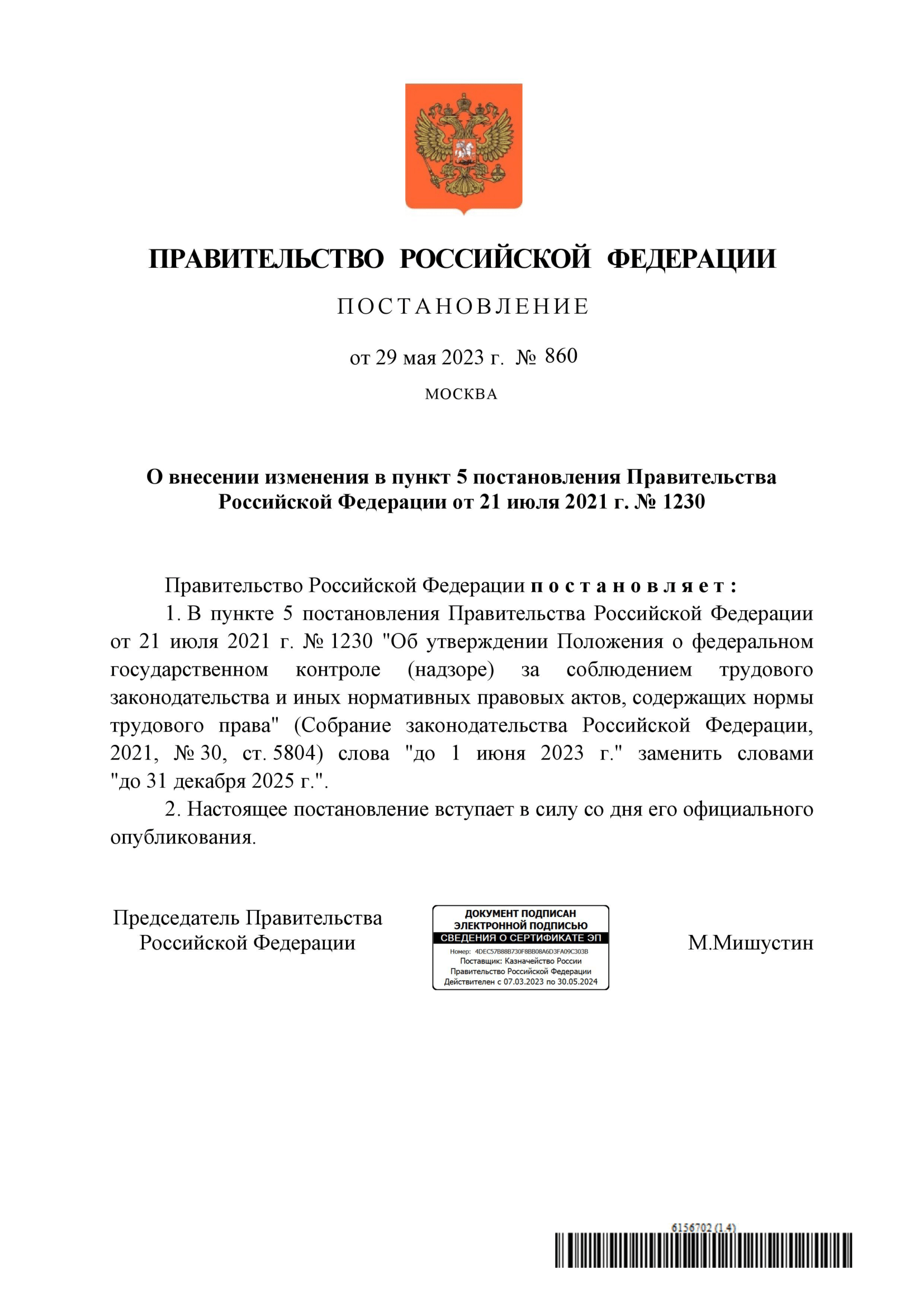
Example of a governmental order issued on May 29, 2023 No. 860.

Orders of the Government of Russia (Russian: Постановления и Pаспоряжения) is secondary legislation, a normative administrative directive content published by the Government of the Russian Federation within the limits of its competence, on the basis and in pursuance of the Constitution of the Russian Federation, federal constitutional laws, federal laws and Decrees of the President of Russia.

== History ==
Historically, during the Soviet Union's existence, the Chairman of the Council of Ministers of the Soviet Union issued orders and resolutions either as a standalone document or as a Joint Resolution of the CPSU Central Committee and the Council of Ministers. Following the dissolution of the Soviet Union and with the adoption of the 1993 constitution, Government orders are signed by the Prime Minister of Russia. Government orders are binding in the Russian Federation. In the event of conflict with the Constitution of the Russian Federation, federal laws and decrees of the President, government orders may be revoked by the President of Russia. Orders of the Government of the Russian Federation may also be deemed to be unconstitutional by the Constitutional Court of Russia.

== Publication ==
Resolution of the Government of the Russian Federation are subject to compulsory official publication, except for acts or separate provisions, containing information constituting a state secret, or confidential information. Resolution of the Government of the Russian Federation must be officially published in Rossiskaya Gazeta and the Assembly of the RF legislation, within ten days from the date of signing. Control over the correctness and timeliness of publication of government decrees implementing Government Office. Other acts of the Russian government, including acts that contain information containing state secrets or confidential information, enter into force on the date of signing. The decisions of the Government of the Russian Federation can be equipped with a different order of their entry into force.

== See also ==
- Decree of the President of Russia
- Resolution of the CPSU Central Committee and the Council of Ministers of the Soviet Union
