= Comet (experiment) =

Nuclear physics project in J-PARC, Japan

COMET (Coherent Muon to Electron Transition) is a nuclear physics experiment in J-PARC, Tokai, Japan. In contrast to the usual muon decay to an electron and neutrino, COMET seeks to look for neutrinoless muon to electron conversion, where the electron flies away with an energy of 104.8 MeV. Muon to electron conversion is not forbidden in the Standard Model but the branching ratio is about $\mathcal{O}(10^{-54})$ considering neutrino oscillations. In beyond the Standard Model approaches the muon to electron conversion process can be as high as $\mathcal{O}(10^{-15})$ e.g. via the supersymmetric $\tilde{\chi_{0} }$.

COMET will be using a new beamline connecting the J-PARC main ring and the J-PARC Nuclear and particle Physics Experimental Hall (NP hall).

The current spokesperson is Kuno Yoshitaka alongside project manager Mihara Satoshi. The collaboration consists of universities coming from 15 countries.

== See also ==
- Mu2e experiment
