= Decree of the President of Russia =

Russian legal act

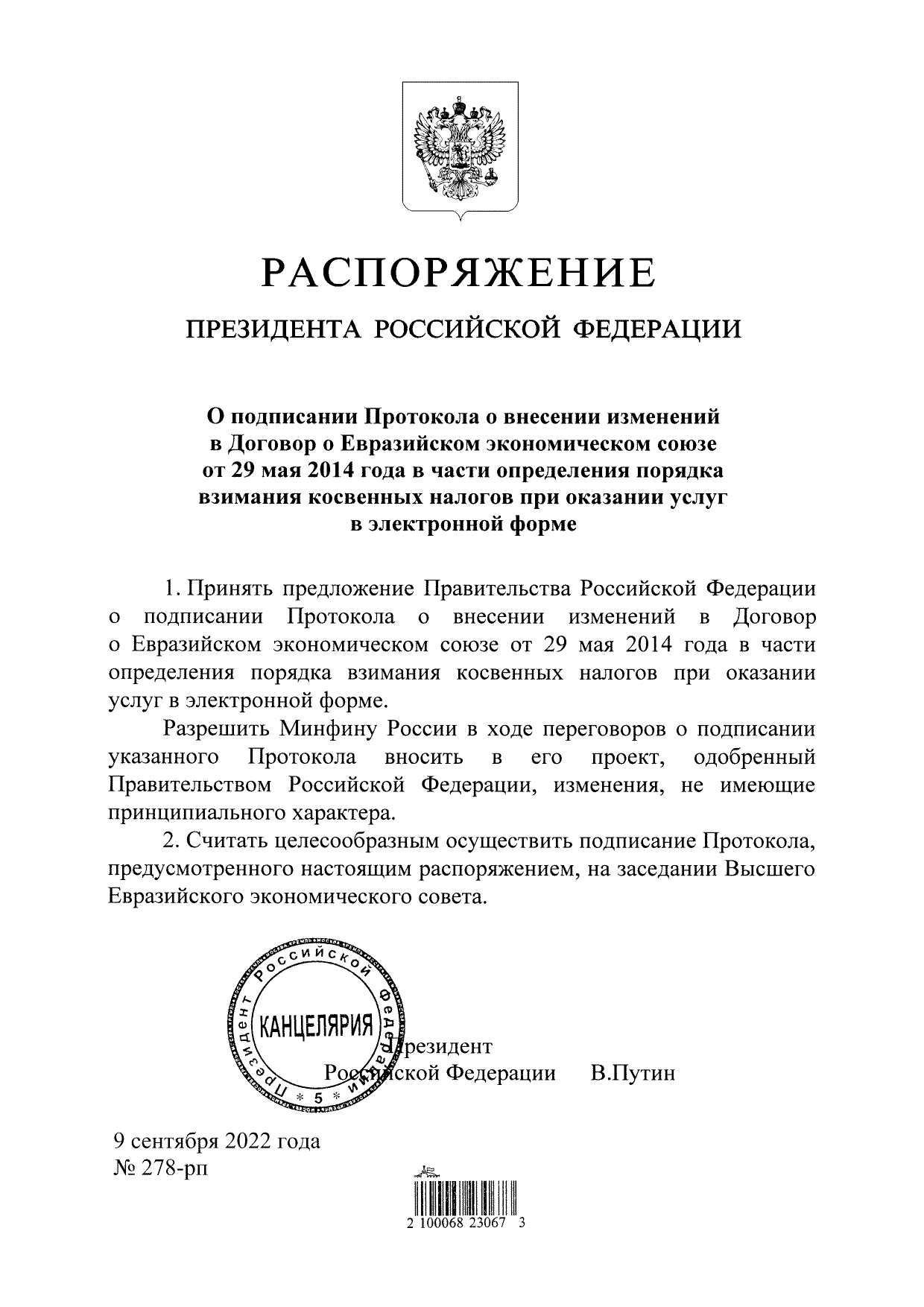
Decree of the President of Russia on 9 September 2022

A Decree of the President of the Russian Federation (Russian: Указ Президента Российской Федерации, romanized: Ukaz Prezidenta Rossiyskoy Federatsii) or Executive Order (Decree) of the President of Russia is a legal act with the status of a by-law made by the President of Russia.

As normative legal acts, such have the status of by-laws in the hierarchy of legal acts (along with Decrees of the Government of the Russian Federation and instructions and directions of other officials). Presidential decrees may not alter existing laws of higher precedence – the Constitution of Russia, Federal Constitutional Laws, Federal Laws and laws of Russian regions and, until the 2020 Russian constitutional referendum, Russia's international agreements, which now however stand in lower precedence than Presidential Decrees or any other Russian state law or obligation – and may be superseded by any of these laws.

Decrees and orders of the President of the Russian Federation are binding on the entire territory of Russia. They must not contradict the Constitution of the Russian Federation, federal constitutional laws and federal laws. Decrees and orders have the highest legal force after the Constitution of the Russian Federation and federal laws, and are subordinate legal acts.

The acts of the President of the Russian Federation are subject to official publication within 10 days after the date of their signing.

Acts of the President of the Russian Federation, which have a normative character, enter into force simultaneously throughout the territory of the state after seven days from the date of their first official publication. Other acts of the President, including acts containing information constituting a state secret or confidential information, come into force from the date of their signing. The act itself may establish a different procedure for its entry into force. The letter "c" or the letter "cc" is added to the number of the decree containing the state secret, depending on the classification of the secrecy of the information contained in the decree.

By decree, the President of Russia has the right to suspend the operation of acts of the executive authorities of the subjects of Russia in the event that these acts contradict the Constitution of Russia, federal constitutional laws and federal laws, international obligations of the Russian Federation, or violations of human and civil rights and freedoms.

In the Collection of Legislation of the Russian Federation, acts of the President of Russia are published in the third section. At the same time, regulatory decrees are posted first, followed by non—normative orders.

== History ==
In 1992 and 1993 a constant war between President Yeltsin and the Russian parliament became known as "war of laws" when presidential decrees issued by president Yeltsin were overturned by separate legislation adopted by the parliament. The war reached its peak in October 1993 when Yeltsin ordered to shoot the parliament building. Following the 1993 referendum, which resulted in the adoption of a new constitution, Yeltsin continued to issue decrees, although their use gradually declined as the legislative vacuum was filled by the enactment of various laws, limiting the scope of presidential discretion.

== See also ==
- Order of the Government of Russia
- Resolution of the CPSU Central Committee and the Council of Ministers of the Soviet Union
- Decree 172 – Fossil fuel financing-related conflicts
- Executive order (United States) – Federal administrative instruction issued by the U.S. president
