= Resolution of the CPSU Central Committee and the Council of Ministers of the Soviet Union =

Resolution of the Central Committee of the Communist Party of the Soviet Union and the Council of Ministers of the Soviet Union (Russian: Постановление ЦК КПСС и Совета министров СССР) was a normative document adopted jointly by the Central Committee of the Communist Party of the Soviet Union, the highest party organ in the period between CPSU congresses, and the Council of Ministers of the Soviet Union, the highest executive and administrative body of state power in the Soviet Union. These resolutions defined various aspects of the activities of society in the Soviet Union and were mandatory for all organizations and enterprises.

The practice of issuing joint resolutions of the Central Committee of the Communist Party of the Soviet Union and the Council of People's Commissars of the Soviet Union has been known since the 1930s.

In accordance with the 1977 Constitution of the Soviet Union, legislative functions were assigned to the Supreme Soviet of the Soviet Union, the Council of Ministers was the highest body of executive power and state administration, and the leading and guiding role of the CPSU was enshrined in Article 6 of the constitution. In practice, economic life in the Soviet Union was determined by resolutions of the Central Committee of the CPSU and the Council of Ministers of the Soviet Union.

Sometimes joint resolutions were adopted in an "expanded" composition of subjects: in addition to the Central Committee of the CPSU and the Council of Ministers of the Soviet Union, the Presidium of the Supreme Soviet of the Soviet Union, the All-Union Central Council of Trade Unions, and in some cases, the Central Committee of the All-Union Leninist Young Communist League participated in their adoption.

In accordance with the doctrine of that period, "party-legal norms have a richer content than the regulations issued by the Council of Ministers of the Soviet Union, due to which they extend their effect to a significantly wider circle of people. They are mandatory for both state bodies and party organizations, and their effect also extends to public organizations working under the leadership of the CPSU". Other authors saw in joint resolutions signs of "a combination of acts of political (social-political) and legal regulation".

Legal theorist Sergei Alekseev expressed the idea of a "chain of political acts" as the embodiment of the guiding and directing role of the CPSU: "First, a decision or other guiding provision in a party document, then a general, often joint, decision of the CPSU Central Committee and the Council of Ministers of the Soviet Union, a party-state normative decision on the relevant issue, and, finally, a specific normative act of a state body, and often a complex of acts".

From the point of view of modern assessments, the participation of the Council of Ministers in the publication of such resolutions provided formal legitimacy, and the CPSU Central Committee indicated the real source of power and hinted at the possibility of party responsibility for its failure to implement it. Sometimes, depending on their nature, the Central Committee of the All-Union Leninist Young Communist League or the All-Union Central Council of Trade Unions, that is, the governing bodies of the Komsomol or trade union organizations, were involved in signing such resolutions. Such a joint decision, symbolizing its "democratic" character, had normative functions and was of a mandatory nature.

== See also ==
- Order of the Government of Russia
- Decree of the President of Russia
