= Institute for Nuclear Research =

Russian scientific research centre

Coordinates: 55.4681°N 37.2753°E

Institute for Nuclear Research of the Russian Academy of Sciences Институт ядерных исследований
- Formation: 1970; 56 years ago
- Headquarters: Troitsk, Moscow, Russia
- Official languages: Russian and English
- Chief Researcher: Leonid Vladimirovich Kravchuk
- Director: Maxim Libanov
- Website: inr.ru (in Russian)

Institute for Nuclear Research of the Russian Academy of Sciences (INR RAS, Russian: Институт ядерных исследований) is a Russian scientific research center "for further development of the experimental base and fundamental research activities in the field of atomic nucleus, elementary particle and cosmic ray physics and neutrino astrophysics".

== History ==
It was founded in 1970 by the Decree of the USSR Council of Ministers. Located in Moscow, Russia near the Moscow State University and in Troitsk.

The institute is a founder of the Baksan Neutrino Observatory, the Baikal Deep Underwater Neutrino Telescope (Lake Baikal) and the former Artemovskaya Scientific Station (Soledar, Ukraine).

About 1,300 specialists including 5 academicians and 2 corresponding members of the RAS, 42 doctors and 160 candidates of science work in the institute.

== Directors ==
- Albert Nikiforovich Tavkhelidze, academician of RAS (1970–1986)
- Viktor Anatolyevich Matveev, academician of RAS, head of the Presidium of the Scientific Center of RAS in Troitsk (1987–2014)
- Leonid Vladimirovich Kravchuk (since 2015)

== See also ==
- Vladimir Lobashev
- Joint Institute for Nuclear Research
