= Albert Tavkhelidze =

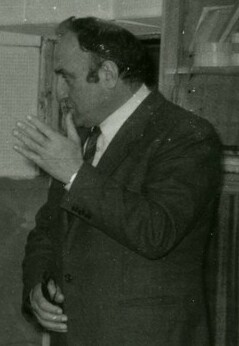
Albert Tavkhelidze in 1986

Albert Nikiforovich Tavkhelidze (Russian: Альберт Никифорович Тавхелидзе, Georgian: ალბერტ ნიკიფორეს ძე თავხელიძე; 16 December 1930 – 27 February 2010) was President of the Georgian National Academy of Sciences (1986–2005). Tavkhelidze was a Doctor of Physical and Mathematical Sciences, Professor, Academician of the Georgian National Academy of Sciences; and earned a Fellowship in the Russian Academy of Sciences.
