= Bonnie Fleming =

American physicist

Bonnie T. Fleming
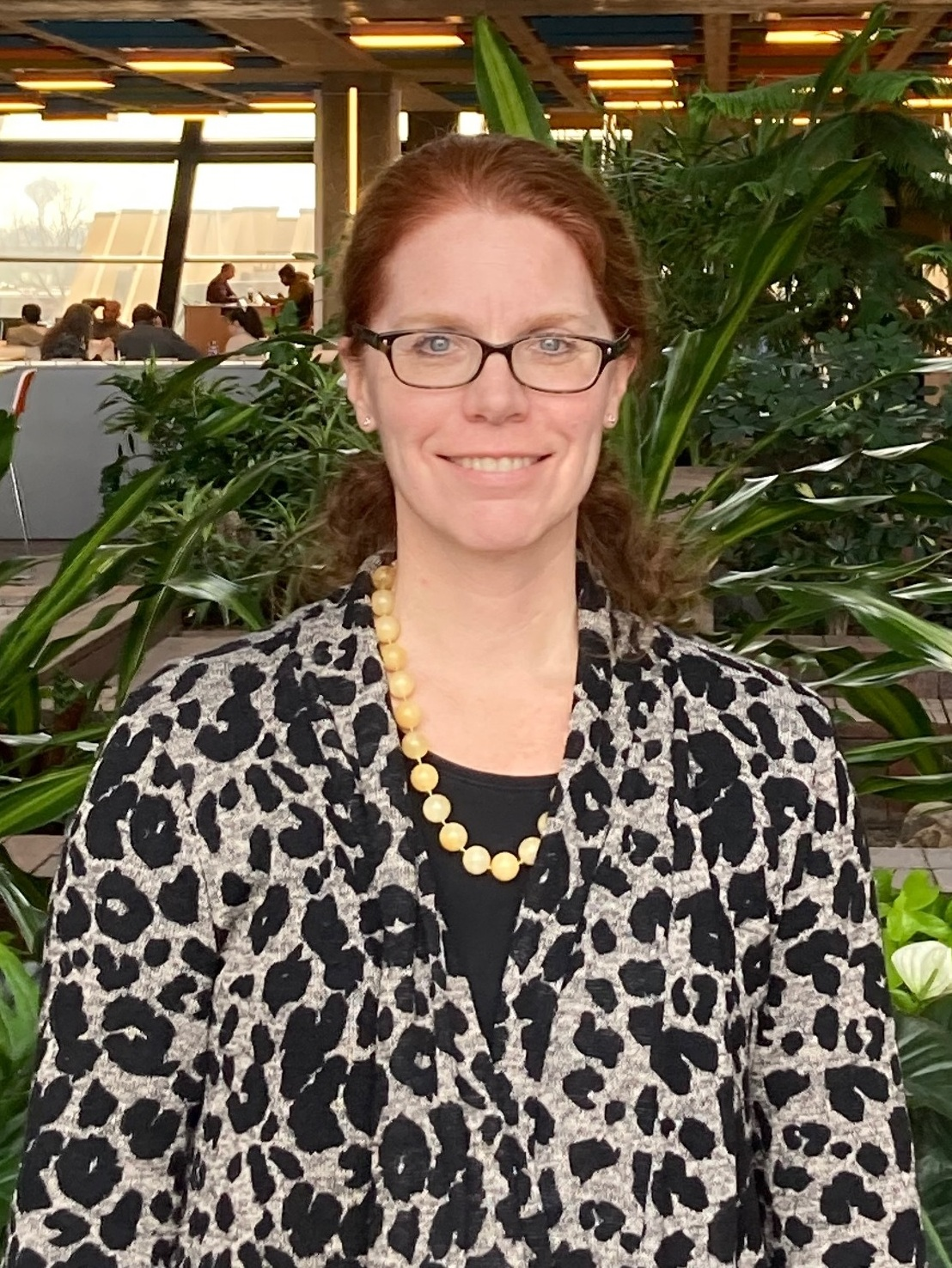
- Scientist Bonnie Fleming in the atrium of Fermilab's Wilson Hall.
- Education: Columbia University, Barnard College
- Known for: Experimental Physics, Neutrino Physics
- Scientific career
- Fields: Physics
- Workplaces: Yale University; Fermilab; University of Chicago

Bonnie T. Fleming is an experimental particle physicist who has held leadership roles in several physics experiments and at Fermilab. Since 2022, she has been Fermilab's chief research officer and deputy director for science and technology. She has also served on the faculty of Yale University and the University of Chicago. Fleming is an expert in neutrino physics and liquid argon time projection chamber detector technology.

== Education ==
Fleming received her bachelor's degree in physics from Barnard College in 1993. After working at Brookhaven National Laboratory as a particle beam operator from 1993 until 1996, she attended Columbia University. While she was a graduate student, she worked on Fermilab's NuTeV experiment. She received her PhD in physics from Columbia University in 2002.

== Career ==
After completing her PhD, Fleming held a postdoctoral position as a Lederman Fellow working on the MiniBooNE neutrino oscillation experiment at Fermilab from 2002 to 2004. In 2004, she joined the faculty of Yale University's department of physics, and she was the second woman to gain tenure in that department.

Fleming continued to work on experiments at Fermilab during her time at Yale. She was a member of the LArIAT (Liquid Argon TPC In A Test beam) collaboration; co-spokesperson on the FINeSSE neutrino scattering experiment; founding spokesperson for the ArgoNeuT Argon Neutrino Test project, which she started in 2006 with support from a National Science Foundation CAREER grant; and founding spokesperson for the MicroBooNE neutrino experiment. Under Fleming's leadership as co-spokesperson, MicroBooNE investigated the excess of electron neutrinos that had been observed by the Liquid Scintillator Neutrino Detector at Los Alamos National Laboratory and by the MiniBooNE experiment at Fermilab, an anomaly which hinted at the possibility of the existence of a fourth type of neutrino. MicroBooNE announced in 2021 that it did not find evidence of these hypothesized sterile neutrinos. Fleming also collaborates on Fermilab's Short-Baseline Near Detector, and DUNE, the Deep Underground Neutrino Experiment. Fleming played a key role in developing the liquid argon time projection chambers used as detectors for many of these experiments. She helped establish Fermilab's Neutrino Physics Center, and from 2016 to 2018 she served as the lab's deputy chief research officer.

Fleming has also served on high-profile particle physics community panels, including as a member of the 2014 Particle Physics Project Prioritization Panel (P5) convened by the High Energy Physics Advisory Panel (HEPAP) and co-chair for the U.S. Department of Energy Basic Research Needs on Instrumentation panel.

In addition to her research and leadership roles, Fleming has also been active in science education and outreach and in supporting women scientists. In 2007, she founded Girls’ Science Investigations, a program that encourages middle school girls in New Haven, Connecticut to cultivate their interest, confidence, and skills in science. In 2012, Fleming and her colleague Sarah Demers won a Yale University Seton Elm-Ivy Award for their work with Girls’ Science Investigations. Under Fleming's guidance, Yale students organized a Conference for Undergraduate Women in Physics at Yale. Fleming also frequently does public outreach work related to her research, and she has been quoted or featured in publications such as The New York Times and The New Yorker, television programs such as Wired Science and community television, and radio programs such as Here and Now.

In September 2022, Fleming was named Fermilab's chief research officer and deputy director for science and technology. At the same time, she was also appointed professor in the department of physics and the Enrico Fermi Institute at the University of Chicago.

== Honors and awards ==
- Henry R. Boorse Prize in Physics, Barnard College, 1993
- Luise Meyer-Schutzmeister Award, Association for Women in Science, 2001
- National Science Foundation CAREER award, 2006
- Junior Faculty Fellowship, Yale University, 2007
- National Academy of Sciences Kavli Frontier Fellow, 2007
- Seton-Elm Ivy Award, Yale University, 2012
- Connecticut Academy of Science and Engineering Fellow, 2012
- American Physical Society Fellow, 2013
- Public Voices Fellow, Yale University, 2013-2014
- American Physical Society Division of Particles and Fields Mentoring Award, 2018
- Elected to National Academy of Sciences, 2024
- Elected to the American Academy of Arts and Sciences, 2024
