= Sam Zeller =

American neutrino physicist

Geralyn P. (Sam) Zeller is an American neutrino physicist at Fermilab. At Fermilab, she is a participant in the MiniBooNE experiment, co-spokesperson for the MicroBooNE experiment, and deputy head of the Neutrino Division.

== Education and career ==
Zeller grew up in Glenview, Illinois, and took the nickname "Sam" after her grandfather, because of their mutual baldness when she was an infant. She joined the Glenbrook Academy of International Studies at Glenbrook South High School, and preferred humanities to mathematics and the sciences until being inspired by a senior-year physics teacher, John Lewis, who took her class on a field trip to Fermilab.

She majored in physics at Northwestern University, and already as an undergraduate began working at Fermilab, helping with the assembly of detectors there. She graduated Phi Beta Kappa and Sigma Pi Sigma in 1994, and completed her Ph.D. at Northwestern in 2002, with doctoral research on neutrino-nucleon scattering in the NuTeV experiment at Fermilab, directed by Heidi Schellman and also mentored by Kevin McFarland at the University of Rochester.

She became a postdoctoral researcher at Columbia University, from 2002 to 2007, while continuing her research at Fermilab; she joined the MiniBooNE collaboration in 2004. After two more years at the Los Alamos National Laboratory, she became a researcher at Fermilab in 2009.

As well as participating in MiniBooNE, Zeller has worked to develop liquid argon neutrino detectors for the MicroBooNE and ArgoNeuT experiments, and has also been a researcher with the SciBooNE and DUNE neutrino experiments.

== Recognition ==
Zeller's doctoral dissertation won the Mitsuyoshi Tanaka Dissertation Award in Experimental Particle Physics of the American Physical Society (APS). She was named the Sambamurti Memorial Lecturer in 2010. In 2021, she was elected as a Fellow of the American Physical Society, after a nomination from the APS Division of Particles and Fields, "for outstanding contributions and intellectual leadership in developing the understanding of GeV neutrino interactions and their importance for past, current, and future neutrino oscillation experiments".

Her neutrino research was featured on the television science series Nova in October 2021.

== Personal life ==
Outside of her scientific career, Zeller is an automobile enthusiast, and an amateur autocross racer.

== Selected publications ==
- Zeller, G. P.; McFarland, K. S.; Adams, T.; Alton, A.; Avvakumov, S.; de Barbaro, L.; et al. (February 2002), "Precise determination of electroweak parameters in neutrino-nucleon scattering", Physical Review Letters, 88 (9) 091802, arXiv:hep-ex/0110059, Bibcode:2002PhRvL..88i1802Z, doi:10.1103/physrevlett.88.091802, PMID 11863995, S2CID 9566324
- Zeller, G. P.; McFarland, K. S.; Adams, T.; Alton, A.; Avvakumov, S.; de Barbaro, L.; et al. (June 2002), "Effect of asymmetric strange seas and isospin-violating parton distribution functions on $\sin^2\theta_W$ measured in the NuTeV experiment", Physical Review D, 65 (11) 111103, arXiv:hep-ex/0203004, doi:10.1103/physrevd.65.111103
- Formaggio, J. A.; Zeller, G. P. (September 2012), "From eV to EeV: Neutrino cross sections across energy scales", Reviews of Modern Physics, 84 (3): 1307–1341, arXiv:1305.7513, Bibcode:2012RvMP...84.1307F, doi:10.1103/revmodphys.84.1307, hdl:1721.1/75437, S2CID 54087013
