= Short-Baseline Near Detector =

Experimental particle physics project

Coordinates: 41.83429°N 88.26942°W

Short-Baseline Near Detector (SBND) is a particle physics experimental project designed to test the sterile neutrino hypothesis. It uses a liquid argon time projection chamber (LArTPC) installed at Fermilab in Batavia, Illinois. SBND is the near detector for the Short-Baseline Neutrino (SBN) program, which includes the ICARUS experiment as the far detector and MicroBooNE lies in between. Like ICARUS and MicroBooNE, SBND lies along the Booster Neutrino Beam (BNB), which uses proton collisions on a beryllium target to produce a concentrated neutrino beam that is then sent through each detector. By comparing measurement results at the various detectors along the beamline, detailed studies of electron neutrino appearance and muon neutrino disappearance can be done through the SBN program. SBND is the newest detector in the SBN program, beginning operations in December 2024 and planning to collect data through early 2028.

== Design ==
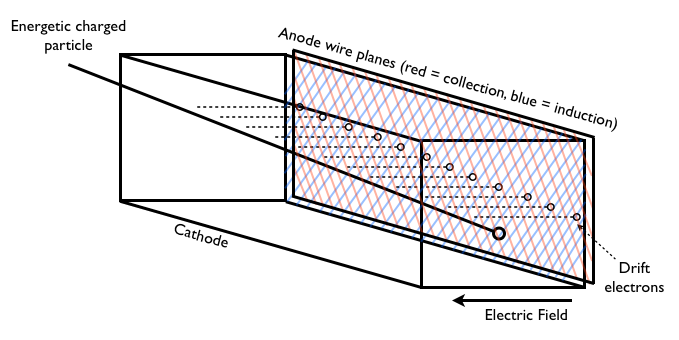
Schematic of LArTPC charge collection principle, demonstrating how ionization electrons drift to the anode plane where they are collected on a series of wire planes

SBND is a LArTPC with an active mass of 112 tons, lying along the BNB beamline 110 m from the target. The SBND active volume is split into two drift volumes, with two electronics readout anode plane assemblies (APAs) separated by the cathode plane in between. An electric field between the cathode and each APA drifts ionization electrons produced by particles emerging from neutrino interactions, enabling their collection on a series of wire planes and allowing for 3D reconstruction of the charged particle tracks. Since SBND is a surface level detector, the rate of crossing cosmic ray muons will be much higher than similar experiments run underground. Because of this larger background activity, characterizing these muons is important in so they are not mistaken for particles from neutrino interactions. In order to do this, SBND employs a cosmic ray tagger system consisting of plastic scintillator panels with embedded optical fibers coupled to silicon photomultipliers (SiPMs) to collect the light.

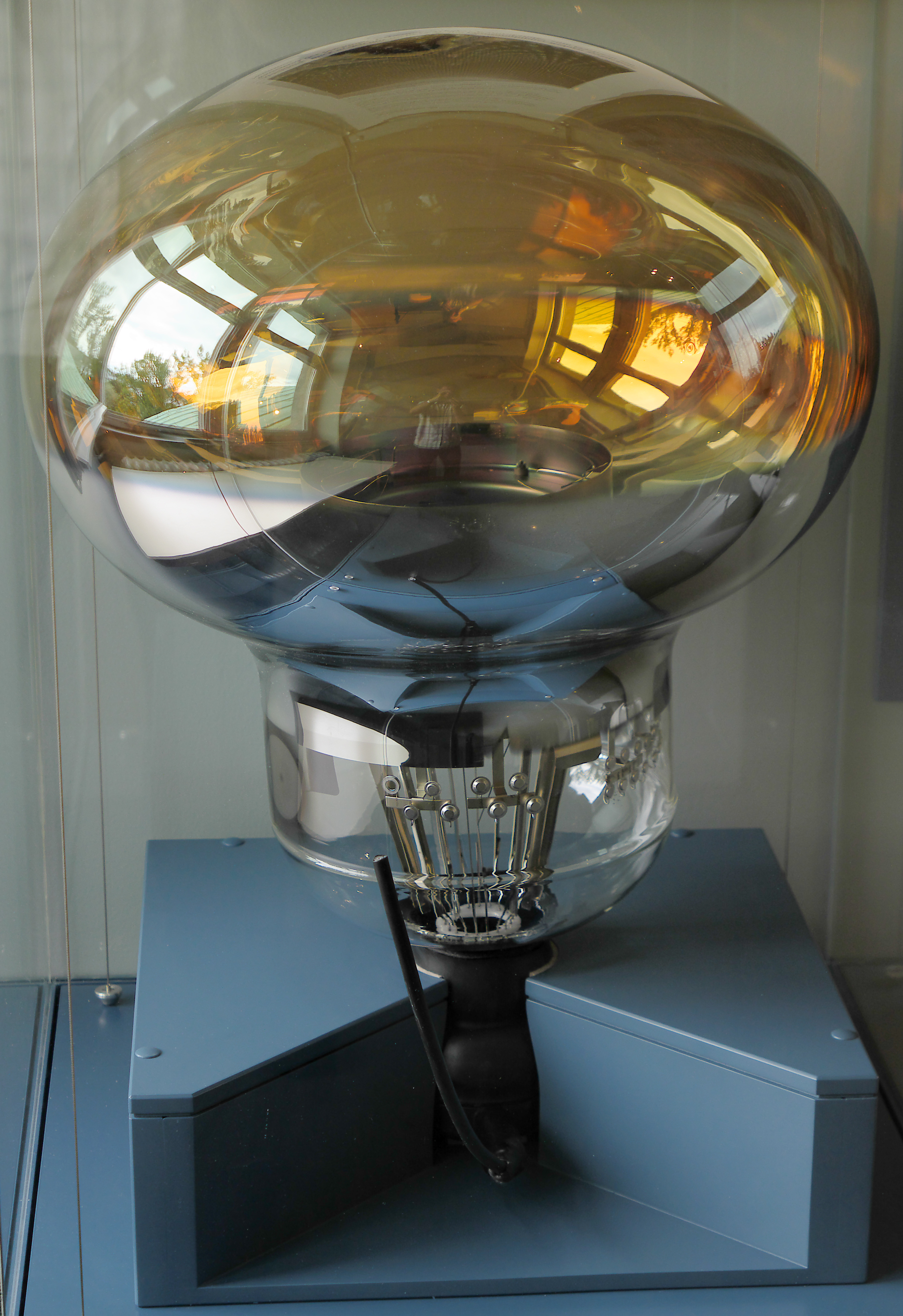
Example of Hamamatsu PMT

Along with charge readout, SBND also includes a photon detection system (PDS). This PDS includes 120 8-inch Hamamatsu cryogenic photo multiplier tubes (PMTs) and 192 X-ARAPUCA modules, which are a SiPM-based photon trap. Standard light detectors (like PMTs and SiPMs) are most sensitive in the visible region, which makes them poorly suited for detecting argon scintillation photons, which are emitted in the vacuum ultraviolet region with a peak intensity of 128 nm. To make detection of these vacuum ultraviolet photons possible, a wavelength shifting coating of either tetraphenyl butadiene or para-terphenyl was applied directly to the optical detector windows as well as a series coated foils mounted on the cathode plane. This provides precise timing resolution with high light yield, with simultaneous independent position reconstruction based on the scintillation light signals.

== Physics ==
The primary physics goals of the SBND include:

- The search for eV-scale sterile neutrinos by performing high-precision measurements of neutrino flux close to the BNB target. This plays a key role in understanding the low-energy excess of electron-like events observed by MiniBooNE and the Liquid Scintillator Neutrino Detector. SBND will either observe or further constrain the sterile neutrino interpretation of this anomaly.
- Performing precision measurements of the neutrino–argon scattering cross sections, which is helped by the high event rate expected for SBND. Around 7,000 neutrino events to be collected by the SBND every day, which is annually more than the six-year MicroBooNE dataset.
- Searches for other Beyond the Standard Model physics, such as heavy neutral leptons, dark photons, heavy QCD axions, among others.

SBND serves as a precursor to the Deep Underground Neutrino Experiment (DUNE), the next-generation LArTPC neutrino experiment that is also hosted by Fermilab and currently under construction. The design and many of the technologies used in SBND will also be used in DUNE, which will benefit from the construction and operational experience gained.

== Operations timeline ==
The various components were assembled and eventually lowered into its cryostat in April 2023. SBND started commissioning Feb 2024, and continued until the high voltage ramp up of the TPC, leading to the first events being detected in early July. After the summer shutdown of the beams at Fermilab ended, SBND saw its first events fully assembled in September 2024. The experiment started its data-taking period in December 2024, with plans to continue taking data until early 2028, corresponding to the long shutdown of the Fermilab accelerator facilities for the PIP-II upgrades.

The SBND collaboration is exploring options to continue taking data after the long shutdown and accelerator facilities come back online in 2029 and beyond. One proposed plan for SBND after the restart includes taking data with the BNB in an antineutrino beam configuration, allowing for data collection of antineutrino–argon scatterings, which currently does not have large statistics, in contrast with neutrino–argon scattering. Another proposal includes running in a dedicated beam-dump mode, enabling SBND to significantly enhance sensitivity to many new physics scenarios.
