= JoAnne L. Hewett =

Theoretical particle physicist

JoAnne Lea Hewett
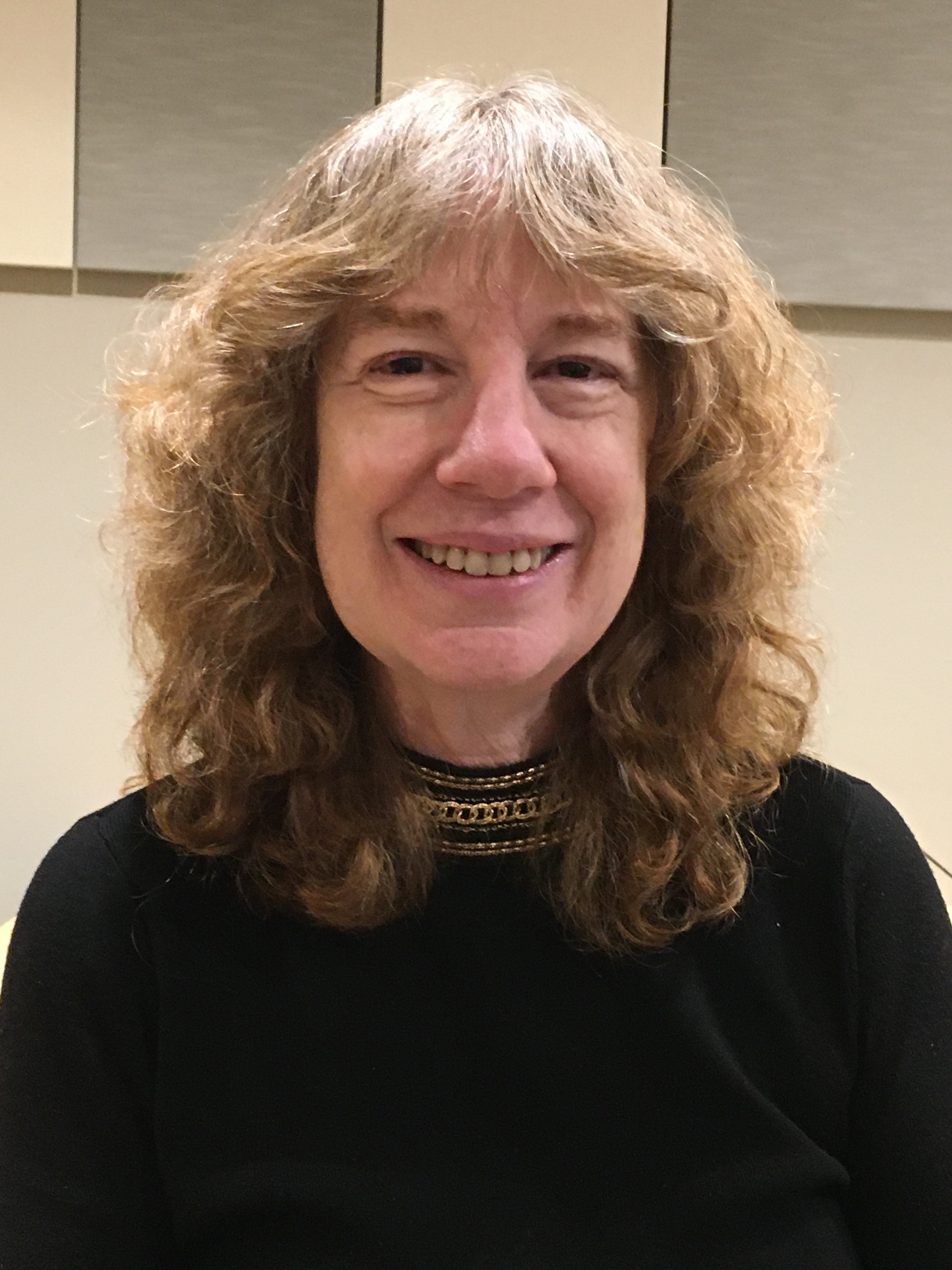
- Hewett in 2020

10th Director of the Brookhaven National Laboratory
- In office 2023–2025

Personal details
- Born: Boulder, CO
- Citizenship: American
- Scientific career
- Education: Iowa State University
- Fields: High energy physics
- Workplaces: SLAC National Accelerator Laboratory; Stanford University; Brookhaven National Laboratory; Stony Brook University
- Thesis: Superstring-inspired E6 phenomenology (1988)

JoAnne L. Hewett is a theoretical particle physicist, a tenured faculty of the C.N. Yang Institute of Theoretical Physics at Stony Brook University.

Her research interests include physics beyond the Standard Model, dark matter, and hidden dimensions. She is a fellow of the American Physical Society and a fellow of the American Association for the Advancement of Science (AAAS).

In April 2023, she was named as the next director of Brookhaven National Laboratory and president Brookhaven Science Associates, taking over these roles from Doon Gibbs. On September 23, 2025, she announced her resignation.

== Early life and education ==
JoAnne Lea Hewett, daughter of Robert and Jean Hewett, lived in Boulder, Colorado, Phoenix, Arizona, St. Louis, Missouri, and Bettendorf, Iowa, while growing up. She completed her undergraduate degree in physics and mathematics at Iowa State University in 1982, and earned her doctorate there in 1988. Her dissertation, titled Superstring Inspired E(6) Phenomenology, was advised by B.-L. Young.

== Career ==
Hewett began her career as a postdoctoral associate from 1988 to 1991 at the University of Wisconsin-Madison and in 1991–1993 she worked as a physicist at Argonne National Laboratory. In 1994 she joined the faculty at SLAC National Accelerator Laboratory, Stanford University, where she was a professor in the Stanford Department of Particle Physics and Astrophysics. She served as associate lab director of the Fundamental Physics Directorate and the chief research officer at SLAC.

Hewett served on Program Advisory Committees of SLAC, Fermi National Accelerator Laboratory, Kavli Institute for Theoretical Physics, and the Cornell Electron Storage Ring. She has chaired the High Energy Physics Advisory Panel and was a member of the panel in 2004–2006 and again in 2016; in 2006 and 2014, she served on the Particle Physics Project Prioritization Panel; and she served as chair of the APS Division of Particles and Fields in 2016.

Hewett served as director of Brookhaven National Laboratory and president Brookhaven Science Associates from 2023—2025.

Her research interests include models of physics beyond the Standard Model, emphasizing collider signatures and the interface with astroparticle physics. Hewett has worked on the "phenomenology of extra spatial dimensions, extended Higgs sectors, supersymmetry, new physics signatures in heavy flavor physics, dark matter, and the complementarity of experimental probes of dark matter". She has collaborated on the BaBar experiment and the International Linear Collider.

== Honors ==
Upon her election in 2007 as a fellow of the American Physical Society, Hewett was cited "For her contributions to our understanding of constraints on and searches for physics beyond the Standard Model, and service to the particle physics community leading studies of future experiments." She was elected in 2009 as a fellow of the American Association for the Advancement of Science.
