= Kamal Benslama =

Moroccan-Swiss Experimental Particle physicist

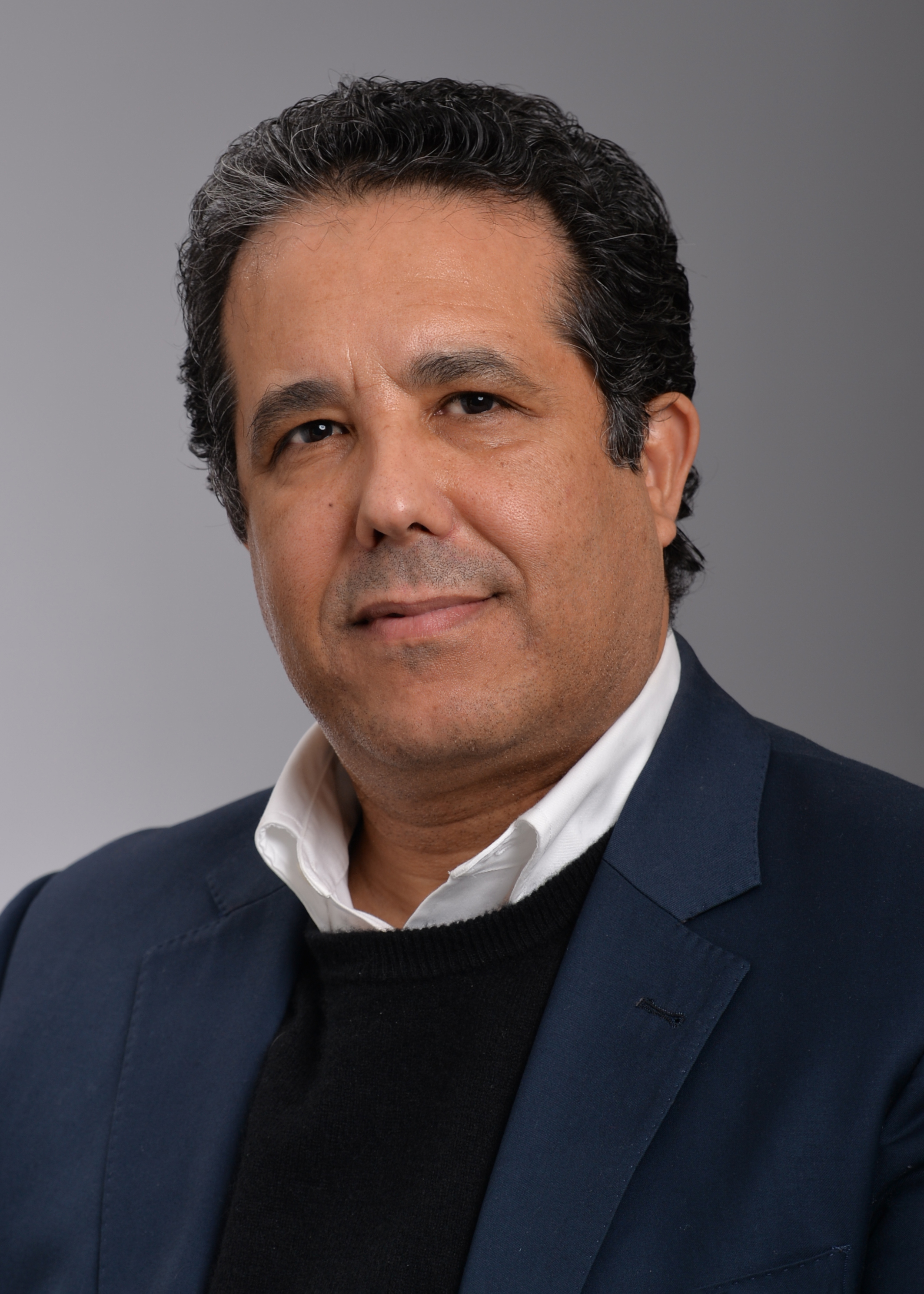
- Experimental Particle Physicist
- Education: University of Lausanne; University of Geneva
- Awards: High Energy and Particle Physics Prize (2013); Person of Extraordinary Ability by the US Government (2020)
- Scientific career
- Fields: Physics, Experimental Particle Physics, Machine Learning
- Workplaces: Drew University; Columbia University; Cornell University; University of Regina; Loyola University Maryland; University of Montreal; University of Lausanne; Syracuse University; University of Illinois Urbana-Champaign; Towson University
- Doctoral advisor: Professor Claude Joseph

Kamal Benslama is a Moroccan-Swiss experimental particle physicist. He is a professor of physics and affiliate faculty of data science at Drew University, a visiting experimental scientist at Fermilab, a guest scientist at Brookhaven National Laboratory, and an Associate Visiting Scientist and Team Leader at CERN. He has worked on a wide range of experiments, including the ATLAS experiment at the Large Hadron Collider (LHC) at CERN in Switzerland; an experiment at Hall A of Jefferson Lab in Virginia; analysis of data from the Crystal Ball experiment at Brookhaven Lab; the CLEO experiment at Cornell University; and experiments at Nevis Laboratories at Columbia University. He is currently a member of the Mu2e collaboration at Fermilab, the international Deep Underground Neutrino Experiment, and the ProtoDUNE experiment at CERN.

== Biography ==
Originally from Morocco, Benslama studied physics at Geneva University. He obtained a bachelor and a master's degree in high-energy physics from Geneva University. In 1998, he completed a PhD at the department of High Energy Physics at the University of Lausanne.

After a short post-doc at the University of Lausanne, Benslama moved to North America in 1999. He first worked as a post-doc on the CLEO experiment at Cornell University in the US, and while at Cornell he collaborated with Syracuse University and the University of Illinois Urbana-Champaign. Then he became a research associate at the University of Montreal before becoming a post-doctoral research scientist at Columbia University in New York and associate scientist on the ATLAS experiment at Large Hadron Collider (LHC) at CERN. from 2006 to 2012, he was a professor of physics at the University of Regina in Canada. During this time, Benslama founded and led an international research group in experimental high-energy physics. He worked on the ATLAS experiment at CERN where he was a principal investigator and a team leader. He also was a member of the international ATLAS collaboration board and a member of the Liquid Argon representative board.

Benslama started his research activities at CERN in 1992, he first worked on ATLAS, then on NOMAD, (Neutrino Oscillation search with a MAgnetic Detector) which was designed to search for neutrino oscillation. His thesis was on the construction, installation and simulation of a preshower particle detector as well as on Data Analysis using data from the NOMAD experiment.

Benslama contributed to many aspects of the ATLAS experiment. He worked on a readout system for a silicon detector for the ATLAS experiment, then he worked on the Liquid Argon Calorimeter, the High Level Trigger and Data quality and Monitoring. He also led several efforts on searches for physics beyond the Standard Model at the LHC, in particular searches for doubly charged higgs, extra-dimensions and leptoquarks. He was heavily involved in the exotics physics program at the LHC.

Before joining Drew University as a faculty, Benslama was a visiting professor at Loyola University Maryland and later he was a Senior Lecturer and Research Professor at Towson University

== Private life ==
Kamal Benslama has children and lives in New Jersey.

== Selected work ==
- Aad, G.; et al. (ATLAS Collaboration) (2012). "Observation of a new particle in the search for the Standard Model Higgs boson with the ATLAS detector at the LHC". Physics Letters B. 716 (1): 1–29. arXiv:1207.7214. Bibcode:2012PhLB..716....1A. doi:10.1016/j.physletb.2012.08.020. hdl:2108/78594.
- Azuelos, G.; Benslama, K.; Ferland, J. (2006). "Prospects for the search for a doubly charged Higgs in the left–right symmetric model with ATLAS". Journal of Physics G. 32 (2): 73–92. arXiv:hep-ph/0503096. Bibcode:2006JPhG...32...73A. doi:10.1088/0954-3899/32/2/002.
- Azuelos, G.; Benslama, K.; et al. (2005). "Exploring Little Higgs Models with ATLAS at the LHC". European Physical Journal C. 39: 13–24. arXiv:hep-ph/0402037. Bibcode:2005EPJC...39...13A. doi:10.1140/epjcd/s2004-02-002-x. S2CID 1374994.
- Buchanan, N. J.; et al. (2008). "Design and implementation of the Front End Board for the readout of the ATLAS liquid argon calorimeters". Journal of Instrumentation. 3 (03): 03004. Bibcode:2008JInst...3.3004B. doi:10.1088/1748-0221/3/03/P03004.
- Aad, G.; et al. (ATLAS Collaboration) (2011). "Search for pair production of first or second generation leptoquarks in proton-proton collisions at √s=7 TeV using the ATLAS detector at the LHC". Physical Review D. 83 (11) 112006. arXiv:1104.4481. Bibcode:2011PhRvD..83k2006A. doi:10.1103/PhysRevD.83.112006.
- "Measurement of the top quark-pair production cross section with ATLAS in pp collisions at √s=7 TeV". European Physical Journal C. 71: 1577. 2011. arXiv:1012.1792. doi:10.1140/epjc/s10052-011-1577-6. hdl:1822/48732.
- The ATLAS Collaboration; et al. (ATLAS Collaboration) (2010). "Measurement of the W → ℓν and Z/γ* → ℓℓ production cross sections in proton-proton collisions at √s=7 TeV with the ATLAS detector". Journal of High Energy Physics. 2010 (12): 060. arXiv:1010.2130. doi:10.1007/JHEP12(2010)060.
- Aad, G.; et al. (ATLAS Collaboration) (2014). "Electron reconstruction and identification efficiency measurements with the ATLAS detector using the 2011 LHC proton–proton collision data". European Physical Journal C. 74 (7) 2941. doi:10.1140/epjc/s10052-014-2941-0. PMC 4371047. PMID 25814900.
- Bornheim, A.; et al. (2003). "Measurements of charmless hadronic two-body B meson decays and the ratio B(B → DK)/B(B → DPi)". Physical Review D. 68 (5) 052002. arXiv:hep-ex/0302026. Bibcode:2003PhRvD..68e2002B. doi:10.1103/PhysRevD.68.052002.
- "K. Benslama – Liste de publications et citations". INSPIRE-HEP.
