= Raymond Brock (physicist) =

American particle physicist (born 1950)

- Born: Raymond L. Brock; August 2, 1950 (age 76); Oak Park, Illinois, U.S.
- Education: Iowa State University (BS); Northern Illinois University (MS); Carnegie Mellon University (MS, PhD)
- Known for: DØ and ATLAS collaborations
- Awards: Fellow of the American Physical Society (1999)
- Scientific career
- Fields: Particle physics
- Workplaces: Michigan State University; Arizona State University; Fermilab
- Thesis: Experimental and Theoretical Study of Charmed and Strange Hadron Production in Anti Ν and Ν Charged Current Interactions at High Energies (1980)
- Doctoral advisor: Lincoln Wolfenstein (theory); Arnold Engler (experiment)

Raymond L. "Chip" Brock (born August 2, 1950) is an American particle physicist and University Distinguished Professor at Michigan State University. Additionally, he is an adjunct professor at Arizona State University. He worked on the DØ experiment at Fermilab and the ATLAS experiment at CERN. He served as chair of the Division of Particles and Fields of the American Physical Society in 2010 and is a Fellow of the American Physical Society.

== Early life and education ==
Brock was born on August 2, 1950, in Oak Park, Illinois. He earned a Bachelor of Science in electrical engineering from Iowa State University in 1972. After working as a sales engineer for Driv-Lok Inc., he returned to academia and received a Master of Science in physics and the philosophy of science from Northern Illinois University in 1975. He then attended Carnegie Mellon University, earning a second master's degree in physics in 1977 and a PhD in elementary particle physics in 1980. His Ph.D. thesis was titled "Experimental and Theoretical Study of Charmed and Strange Hadron Production in Anti Ν and Ν Charged Current Interactions at High Energies".

== Career ==
Following his doctoral work, Brock was a research associate at Fermilab from 1980 to 1982. He joined Michigan State University in 1982 as an assistant professor of physics, was promoted to associate professor in 1986, and became a full professor in 1991. He served as chair of the Department of Physics and Astronomy from 1994 to 2001. In 2011, he was named a University Distinguished Professor.

=== Research ===
Brock's research focuses on experimental tests of the Standard Model of particle physics. In the early 1980s, he worked on Fermilab neutral current neutrino experiments E594 and served as spokesperson for experiment E733. He subsequently became a member of the DØ collaboration, a proton–antiproton colliding beam experiment at Fermilab. Additionally, he also joined the ATLAS collaboration at CERN, a proton–proton collider experiment at the Large Hadron Collider.

=== Professional service ===
He was appointed to the American Physical Society's (APS) Task Force on Academic Tenure in June 1998 to investigate the potential impacts of proposed changes to the academic tenure system. The task force released their final report in December 1998, recommending no overall statement on tenure, but that the APS should encourage more transparency in tenure requirements. He was later made chair of the APS' Division of Particles and Fields in 2010 and was chair of the U.S. ATLAS Institutional Board from 2014 to 2015. He served twice on the Fermilab Users Executive Committee, chairing it once, and was a member of the Fermilab Physics Advisory Committee on two occasions. From 2010 to 2013, he was the U.S. at-large representative to the International Committee on Future Accelerators. He co-led the Energy Frontier working group for the 2013 Snowmass study on the future of U.S. particle physics.

== Awards and honors ==
Brock was elected a Fellow of the American Physical Society in 1999 "for many contributions to experimental high energy physics and the D0 detector which have helped to establish the future direction of physics at Fermilab."
