= SciBooNE =

Neutrino experiment in Fermilab (USA)

Coordinates: 41.8378°N 88.2457°W

SciBooNE Logo.

SciBar Booster Neutrino Experiment (SciBooNE) was a neutrino experiment located at the Fermi National Accelerator Laboratory (Fermilab) in the USA. It observed neutrinos of the Fermilab Booster Neutrino Beam (BNB) that are produced when protons from the Fermilab Booster-accelerator were made to hit a beryllium target; this led to the production of many short-lived particles that decayed into neutrinos. The SciBooNE detector was located some 100 meters downrange from the beryllium target, with a 50 meter decay-volume (where the particle decay into neutrinos) and absorber combined with 50 meters of solid ground between the target and the detector to absorb other particles than neutrinos. The neutrino-beam continued through SciBooNE and ground to the MiniBooNE-detector, located some 540 meters downrange from the target.

SciBooNE was designed to make precise measurements of neutrino and antineutrino cross-sections on carbon and iron nuclei, and combine with MiniBooNE to improve neutrino oscillation searches for sterile neutrinos. The cross section measurements have been used by the T2K experiment which began running in Japan in 2009.

The SciBooNE detector had three subsystems: SciBar, the EC (electron catcher) and the MRD (muon range detector). They can be seen in the event display of SciBooNE's first neutrino event. Many of the components of SciBooNE were recycled from other experiments; thus the budget of SciBooNE was as low as 1.2 million dollars.

SciBooNE took data from June 2007 to August 2008. The operation consisted of 3 data runs; run 1 and 3 were antineutrino studies and run 2 was neutrino study. Data analysis and results were published after 2008. In total, SciBooNE published eight peer-reviewed journal articles, garnering over 711 citations, and many more articles in conference proceedings. Highlights include results about muon neutrino disappearance and muon antineutrino disappearance, which were world-leading at the time of publication. In Fermilab's records, the SciBooNE experiment status is listed as "Completed: Aug. 1, 2013".

The SciBooNE collaboration was a group of approximately 60 scientists from 17 institutions in five countries (Italy, Japan, Spain, United Kingdom and USA). SciBooNE is led by Tsuyoshi Nakaya (Kyoto University) and Morgan Wascko (Imperial College, London).

The SciBooNE experiment hall has since been taken over by the ANNIE experiment.
