= Neutrino anomaly =

The term neutrino anomaly may refer to:

- Neutrino oscillations in conflict with the standard model observed with the LSN Detector and confirmed by the MiniBooNE experiment
- Faster-than-light neutrino anomaly, a measurement at the OPERA experiment observing neutrino flight times inconsistent with special relativity, but later explained by hardware failure
