= Karmen =

Karmen may refer to:

- Karmen (name)
- KARMEN (Karlsruhe Rutherford Medium Energy Neutrino experiment), accelerator neutrino experiment
- Karmen (album), by Karmen Stavec (2003)

== See also ==
- Carmen (disambiguation)
