= Butyl PBD =

Names
- Preferred IUPAC name 2-([1,1′-Biphenyl]-4-yl)-5-(4-tert-butylphenyl)-1,3,4-oxadiazole
- Other names 2-(4-tert-Butylphenyl)-5-(4-biphenylyl)-1,3,4-oxadiazole; 2-(4-Biphenylyl)-5-(4-tert-butylphenyl)-1,3,4-oxadiazole

Identifiers
CAS Number	15082-28-7
3D model (JSmol)	Interactive image
ChemSpider	76483
ECHA InfoCard	100.035.563
EC Number	239-135-7
PubChem CID	84782
UNII	YKR9AP6LRZ
CompTox Dashboard (EPA)	DTXSID5065851
- InChI: InChI=1S/C24H22N2O/c1-24(2,3)21-15-13-20(14-16-21)23-26-25-22(27-23)19-11-9-18(10-12-19)17-7-5-4-6-8-17/h4-16H,1-3H3 Key: XZCJVWCMJYNSQO-UHFFFAOYSA-N; InChI=1/C24H22N2O/c1-24(2,3)21-15-13-20(14-16-21)23-26-25-22(27-23)19-11-9-18(10-12-19)17-7-5-4-6-8-17/h4-16H,1-3H3 Key: XZCJVWCMJYNSQO-UHFFFAOYAT
- SMILES: CC(C)(C)c1ccc(cc1)c2nnc(o2)c3ccc(cc3)c4ccccc4

Properties
Chemical formula	C_{24}H_{22}N_{2}O
Molar mass	354.44 g mol^{−1}
- Except where otherwise noted, data are given for materials in their standard state (at 25 °C [77 °F], 100 kPa). verify (what is ?) Infobox references

Butyl PBD or b-PBD (short for butyl-phenyl-bipheny-oxydiazole) is a fluorescent organic compound used in the Liquid Scintillator Neutrino Detector (LSND) at Los Alamos National Laboratory, USA.

The fluorescent emission of b-PBD is at λ_{em} = 364 nm for excitation at λ_{ex} = 305 nm (in ethanol solution). As a scintillant in the LSND, it was used at a concentration of 31 mg/L (87 μmol/L) dissolved in mineral oil.
