= ICARUS experiment =

Neutrino experiment

ICARUS (Imaging Cosmic And Rare Underground Signals) is a physics experiment aimed at studying neutrinos. It was located at the Laboratori Nazionali del Gran Sasso (LNGS) where it started operations in 2010. After completion of its operations there, it was refurbished at CERN for re-use at Fermilab, in the same neutrino beam as the MiniBooNE, MicroBooNE and Short-Baseline Near Detector (SBND) experiments. The ICARUS detector was then taken apart for transport and reassembled at Fermilab, where data collection is expected to begin in fall 2021.

The ICARUS program was initiated by Carlo Rubbia in 1977, who proposed a new type of neutrino detector. These are called Liquid Argon Time Projection Chambers (LAr-TPC), which should combine the advantages of bubble chambers and electronic detectors, evolving previous detectors. They detect neutrinos through the reaction:

$${}^{40}Ar + \nu \rightarrow {}^{40}K + e^{-} \,$$

(a neutrino combining with an atom of argon-40 to yield an atom of potassium-40 and an electron.)

In the course of the ICARUS program, such detectors of considerable capacity were proposed. After first runs at Pavia in 2001, the ICARUS T600 detector at Gran Sasso, filled with 760 tons of liquid argon, started operation in 2010. In order to study neutrino oscillations and various fundamental topics of modern physics, neutrinos of astronomic or solar sources, and CERN Neutrinos to Gran Sasso (CNGS) beam produced 730 km away by the Super Proton Synchrotron from CERN, have been detected.

The CNGS neutrinos are also studied by the OPERA experiment, therefore those experiments are also called CNGS1 (OPERA) and CNGS2 (ICARUS).

The CNGS measurements also became important when the OPERA group announced in September and November 2011 that they had measured superluminal neutrinos (see faster-than-light neutrino anomaly). Shortly afterwards, the ICARUS collaboration published a paper in which they argued that the energy distribution of the neutrinos is not compatible with superluminal particles. This conclusion was based on a theory of Cohen and Sheldon Glashow. In March 2012, they published a direct neutrino velocity measurement based on seven neutrinos events. The result was in agreement with the speed of light and thus special relativity, and contradicts the OPERA result. In August 2012, another neutrino velocity measurement based on 25 neutrino events was published with increased accuracy and statistics, again in agreement with the speed of light. (See measurements of neutrino speed.)

The ICARUS detector moved to Fermilab in July 2017 for a new neutrino experiment. In February 2020, scientists at Fermilab began cooling down ICARUS and filling it with 760 tons of liquid argon. Scientists hope to take the first measurements with the refurbished ICARUS later in 2020. In May 2021, Fermilab announced that ICARUS would begin data collection in the fall of 2021.
