= Giant Radio Array for Neutrino Detection =

Proposed neutrino detector

- Alternative names: GRAND
- Website: grand.cnrs.fr

The Giant Radio Array for Neutrino Detection (GRAND) is a proposed large-scale detector designed to collect ultra-high energy cosmic particles as cosmic rays, neutrinos and photons with energies exceeding 10^{17} eV. This project aims at solving the mystery of their origin and the early stages of the universe itself. The proposal, formulated by an international group of researchers, calls for an array of 200,000 receivers to be placed on mountain ranges around the world.

== Overview ==
The GRAND detector would search for neutrinos, exotic particles emitted by some and the black holes in the center of galaxies. These neutrinos could help astronomers find the source of other energetic particles called ultra-high-energy cosmic rays. When neutrinos reach Earth, they often collide with particles either in the air or on the ground, creating showers of secondary particles. These secondary particles can be picked up by the radio antennas, which lets researchers calculate the trajectory of the initial neutrinos and trace them back to their source. The concept was first published in 2017.

The giant radio detector array would comprise 200,000 low-cost antennas in groups of 10,000 spread out over nearly 200,000 square kilometres (77,000 sq mi) at different locations around the world. This would make it the largest detector in the world. Construction, installation and networking the 200,000 antennae, would cost approximately US$226 million, excluding the price for renting the land and manpower.

== Principle ==
The strategy of GRAND is to detect the radio emission coming from particle showers that develop in the terrestrial atmosphere as a result of the interaction of ultra-high energy (UHE) cosmic rays, gamma rays, and neutrinos. Astrophysical tau neutrinos (ν_{τ}) can be detected through extensive air showers (EAS) induced by tau (τ^{−}) decays in the atmosphere. The short-lived tau decays in the atmosphere generates an EAS that emits measurable electromagnetic emissions up to frequencies of hundreds of MHz. The antennae are foreseen to operate in the 60-200 MHz band to avoid the short-wave background noise at lower frequencies.

Each individual antenna is a simple Bow-tie design, featuring 3 perpendicular bows with an additional vertical arm to sample all three polarization directions. Each antenna is mounted on a single 5-meter-tall pole, and each antenna in the grid is spaced at 1 km within a square grid. If the full array of 200,000 antennae is built, GRAND would reach an all-flavor sensitivity of 4 × 10^{−10} GeV cm^{−2} s^{−1} sr^{−1} above 5 × 10^{17} eV. Because of its sub-degree angular resolution, GRAND will also search for point sources of UHE neutrinos, steady and transient, potentially starting UHE neutrino astronomy, allowing for the discovery and follow-up of large numbers of radio transients, fast radio bursts, giant radio pulses, and for precise studies of the epoch of reionization.

The researchers estimate that GRAND could allow not just the detection of neutrinos, but could also allow a differentiation of the source types, such as galaxy clusters with central sources, fast-spinning newborn pulsars, active galactic nuclei, and afterglows of gamma-ray bursts.

== Status ==
Simulation and experimental work is ongoing on technological development and background rejection strategies. Phase one is called GRANDProto35, that includes 35 antennas and 24 scintillators, deployed in the Tian Shan mountains in China. If a pulse is observed simultaneously in the signals from three or more scintillators, the signals are recorded. As of October 2018, GRANDProto35 is in commissioning phase. So far, the system achieves 100% detection efficiency for trigger rates up to 20 kHz.

The following step is planned for 2020, and it is a dedicated setup called GRANDProto300 within an area of 300 square kilometres (120 sq mi). The baseline layout is a square grid with a 1 kilometre (0.62 mi) inter-antenna spacing, just as for later stages. Because GRANDProto300 will not be large enough to detect cosmogenic neutrinos, the viability will be tested using instead extensive air showers initiated by very inclined cosmic rays, thus providing an opportunity to do cosmic-ray science. The site would be hosted at the Chinese provinces of XinJiang, Inner Mongolia, Yunnan, and Gansu. If funded, the later phases would build GRAND10k in 2025, and finally GRAND200k (200,000 receivers) in the 2030s.

== See also ==
- High-energy astronomy
- List of neutrino experiments
- Multi-messenger astronomy
- Neutrino astronomy
