= KARMEN =

Accelerator neutrino experiment

Coordinates: 51°34′18″N 1°19′12″W

KARMEN (KArlsruhe Rutherford Medium Energy Neutrino experiment), a detector associated with the ISIS synchrotron at the Rutherford Appleton Laboratory. Neutrinos for study are supplied via the decay of pions produced when a proton beam strikes a target. It operated from 1990 until March 2001, observing the appearance and disappearance of electron neutrinos. KARMEN searched for neutrino oscillations, with implications for the existence of sterile neutrinos.

== Results ==
Limits were set on neutrino oscillation parameters. The KARMEN results disagreed with the LSND experiment and were followed up by MiniBooNE.
