= Accelerator Neutrino Neutron Interaction Experiment =

Water Cherenkov detector experiment

Logo for the Accelerator Neutrino Neutron Interaction Experiment

The Accelerator Neutrino Neutron Interaction Experiment (ANNIE) is a water Cherenkov detector experiment designed to examine the nature of neutrino interactions. This experiment studies phenomena like proton decay, and neutrino oscillations, by analyzing neutrino interactions in gadolinium-loaded water and measuring their neutron yield. Neutron Tagging plays an important role in background rejection from atmospheric neutrinos. By implementing early prototypes of LAPPDs (Large Area Picosecond Photodetector), high precision timing is possible. The suggested location for ANNIE is the SciBooNE hall on the Booster Neutrino Beam associated with the MiniBooNE experiment. The neutrino beam originates in Fermilab where The Booster delivers 8 GeV protons to a beryllium target producing secondary pions and kaons. These secondary mesons decay to produce a neutrino beam with an average energy of around 800 MeV. ANNIE began installation in the summer of 2015. Phase I of ANNIE, mapping the neutron background, completed in 2017. The detector was upgraded for full science operation (so-called Phase II) in July 2019 and data collection began in 2020.

== Experimental design ==
ANNIE runs using the Booster Neutrino Beam (BNB) which runs at 7.5 Hz, with roughly 4 trillion protons-on-target per spill. These are delivered in 81 bunches over 1.6 microseconds per spill to a target 100 meters upstream in the SciBooNE hall. The beam, in neutrino mode, is 94% pure muon neutrinos with a flux peak energy at around 700 MeV.

The water target used by ANNIE is a cylindrical volume 3.8 m long and 2.3 m in diameter encased by a plastic liner and aluminium enclosure. The target is to be instrumented by 60 to 100 eight-inch photomultiplier tubes. Part of the iron-scintillator sandwich detector used to track the direction of daughter muons in the SCiBooNE target, called the Muon Range Detector (MRD), could be used by ANNIE. The MRD will be modified by replacing 10 of the 13 layers of scintillator with resistive plate chambers (RPCs). This upgrade will allow centimeter-level precision at each layer. Moreover, the RCPs are capable of withstanding a 1 T magnetic field. Such an applied field could someday be added to ANNIE in order to achieve charge-spin reconstruction in the MRD. This would also allow momentum reconstruction at the highest event energies.

Given the few-meter scale of the detector, it would be possible to achieve timing based reconstruction of events using information from the Cherenkov radiation produced during events in the detector. In order to achieve the necessary picosecond time resolution, ANNIE intends to use early commercial prototypes of Large Area Picosecond Photodetectors (LAPPDs).

=== LAPPDs ===
Large Area Picosecond Photodetectors are (8 in. x 8 in. x 0.6 in) MCP photodetectors. While common PMTs are single pixel detectors, LAPPDs are able to resolve the position and time of single photons within a single detector with time and space resolutions higher than 3 mm and 100 picoseconds accordingly. Initial Monte Carlo simulations show that using LAPPDs of this accuracy would allow ANNIE to operate as a tracking detector with track and vertex reconstruction resolution on the order of a few centimeters. These detectors are in their final stages of development.

== Physics goals ==
Chart showing 3 neutrinos and interacting particles, according to the Standard Model of Elementary Particles

The use of a directed neutrino beam allows the reconstruction of the initial neutrino energy and therefore total momentum transfer during the interaction. ANNIE examines the interactions between neutrinos and nuclei in water with the aim of producing measurements of final state neutron abundance as a function of total momentum transfer. Neutron capture is aided by the solvated gadolinium salts which have high neutron capture cross sections and emit around 8MeV in gamma radiation upon absorption of a thermalized neutron. Characterization of neutron yield in proton decay background events, which are predominantly encountered in atmospheric neutrino interactions in large water Cherenkov Detectors like Super-Kamiokande, would help increase confidence in the observation of proton-decay-like events. By studying the neutron yield, the events captured in the fiducial volume may be separated between a variety of charged current (‘’CC’’) and neutral current (‘’NC’’) event types.

The ability to tag neutrons in the final state will also allow ANNIE to test specific nuclear models for validity in neutrino interactions. In neutrino mode, the mode in which the beam is predominantly neutrinos, neutron multiplicity is expected to be lower for CC interactions. This can be used to distinguish electron neutrino oscillation candidates from backgrounds such as neutral pion or photon production. Additionally, ANNIE will look for appearance of electron neutrinos in the beamline.

== Proton decay ==
Proton decay is a prediction of many grand unification theories. ANNIE will characterize the neutron yield of events that generate signatures similar to those of proton decay in water Cherenkov detectors. The two channels of proton decay that are of interest to ANNIE, and most popular among GUTs are:

| p^{+} | → | e^{+} | + | π^{0} |
| p^{+} | → | K^{+} | + | ν |

The former is the preferred decay channel in minimal SU(5) and SO(10) GUT models while the second is typical of supersymmetric GUTs where dimension-5 operators induce decays that require a strange quark. Super-Kamiokande has shown a minimum limit above 10^{34} years.

In the neutral pion channel, there would be three showering tracks, one from the charged lepton and two from the neutral pion decay products. In order to confirm PDK, two of the tracks must give an invariant mass close to that of the neutral pion, 85 -185 MeV, the total invariant mass given by the tracks must be near that of the proton 800-1050 MeV and the unbalanced momentum must be less than 250 MeV. In this channel, 81% of the backgrounds are charged current events with 47% being events with one or more pions, and 28% being quasi-elastic and in similar ratios when the charged lepton is an anti-muon. In the Charged kaon channel, evidence of the kaon is seen in its decay products, which are a predominantly an anti-muon and a muon neutrino. The second common decay channel of the kaon produces a charged pion and a neutral pion. The subsequent decay of the charged pion produces a muon which is within the detectable threshold for water Cherenkov detectors. Thus both of these channels are also prone to CC atmospheric neutrino background.

Proton decay background events predominately produce one or more neutron whereas proton decays are expected to produce a neutron only ~6% of the time

== Neutron tagging ==
Free final state neutrons are captured in the gadolinium-doped water of the detector. Even neutrons with energies ranging in the hundreds of MeV will quickly lose energy through collisions in water. Once these neutrons have been thermalized, they undergo radiative capture wherein they are incorporated into a nucleus to produce a more tightly bound state. The excess energy is given off as a gamma cascade. In pure water, neutron capture produces about 2.2 MeV in gamma radiation. In order to enhance visibility of neutron capture events, Gadolinium salts are dissolved into ANNIE's aqueous media. Gadolinium has a larger capture cross-section, around 49,000 barns, and this occurs on the orders of microseconds after the free neutron is emitted. Additionally, the capture event in gadolinium produces an 8 MeV cascade of 2- 3 gammas.

The nature of neutron producing processes associated in neutrino interactions is poorly understood, although it is observed that such interactions at GeV scales readily produce one or more neutrons. The number of neutrons in the final state is expected to depend on the momentum transfer with higher energy interactions producing a larger number of neutrons. This phenomenon has been documented in large water Cherenkov detectors. These characteristic neutrino events constitute a large portion of PDK background. While the presence of neutrons can be used to eliminate background events, the absence of any neutrons can significantly improve the confidence in the observation of a PDK event. ANNIE will attempt to characterize the exact confidence in rejection of background events based on neutron tagging experiments optimized to the application of atmospheric neutrino interactions. Such extrapolation is possible due to the similarity between the flux profile of the Booster neutrino beam and the atmospheric neutrino flux.

Neutron Backgrounds in ANNIE arise primarily from neutrino interactions with surrounding rock upstream.

== Time-Line ==
=== Phase one: technical development and background characterization ===
- Begin Installation Summer 2015
- Run Fall 2015 - Spring 2016

ANNIE will aim to characterize neutron backgrounds. Initial runs will be done with 60 Type-S PMTs rather than LAPPDs until these become available. This time will be used to test prototype LAPPDs. Additionally, a movable, smaller volume of gadolinium doped water will be used to measure rates of neutron events as a function of position inside the tank.

=== Phase two: ANNIE physics run I ===
- Installation Summer 2016

ANNIE will begin this phase when sufficient LAPPDs are acquired. This phase involves the use of a full gadolinium-doped water volume, 60 Type-S PMTs, a small but sufficient number of LAPPDs, and the refurbished MRD. The first measurement will be of neutron yield as a function of momentum transfer and visible energy. This phase aims to demonstrate full DAQ, successfully operation of LAPPDs for tracking, successfully operation of the MRD for tracking, and complete timing calibrations.

=== Phase three: ANNIE physics run II ===
- Run Fall 2017 or upon completion of phase II until Fall 2018

This stage represents the full realization of the ANNIE detector. LAPPD coverage will be at over 10% isotropically which corresponds to 50-100 LAPPDs. During this stage, detailed reconstruction of kinematics will be possible, and therefore, measurements of neutron yield for event classes determined by final state particles. Phase III will designed to identify PDK-backgrounds based on simulations and data from Phase I and II.
