= Deep Underground Neutrino Experiment =

Under-construction physics experiment facility in the United States

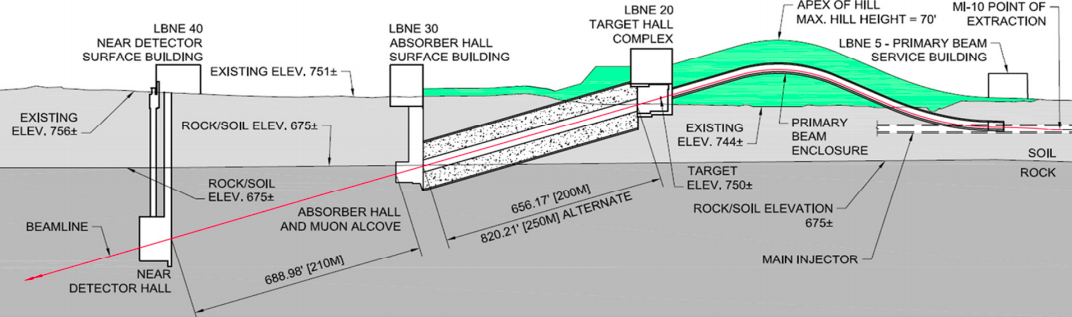
- Longitudinal section of the beamline for the experiment from the Main Injector
- Alternative names: DUNE
- Location: United States
- Coordinates: 41°49′55″N 88°15′26″W
- Website: dunescience.org
- Location within the United States
- Related media on Commons

The Deep Underground Neutrino Experiment (DUNE) is a neutrino experiment under construction in the United States, with a near detector at Fermilab, Illinois, and a far detector at the Sanford Underground Research Facility (SURF), South Dakota, that will observe neutrinos produced at Fermilab. An intense beam of trillions of neutrinos from the production facility at Fermilab will be sent over a distance of 1,300 kilometers (810 mi), with the goal of understanding the role of neutrinos in the universe. More than 1,000 collaborators are involved in the project. The experiment is designed for a 20-year period of data collection.

The primary science objectives of DUNE are

- Investigation of neutrino oscillations to test CP violation in the lepton sector, which explores why the universe is made of matter.
- Determination of the ordering of neutrino masses.
- Studies of supernovae and the formation of a neutron star or black hole, even though the detector is 1,490 meters (0.93 mi) deep underground with no direct view of the sky.
- Search for proton decay, which has never been observed but is predicted by theories that unify the fundamental forces.

In 2014, the Particle Physics Project Prioritization Panel (P5) ranked this as "the highest priority project in its timeframe" (recommendation 13). The importance of these goals has led to proposals for competing projects in other countries, particularly the Hyper-Kamiokande experiment in Japan, scheduled to begin data-taking in 2027. The DUNE project has suffered delays to its schedule and cost increases from under $2B to over $3B, leading to articles in Science and Scientific American describing it as "troubled". In 2022, DUNE set a neutrino-beam start-date for the early-2030s, and the project is now phased.

== Design of LBNF/DUNE ==
=== Long Baseline Neutrino Facility ===
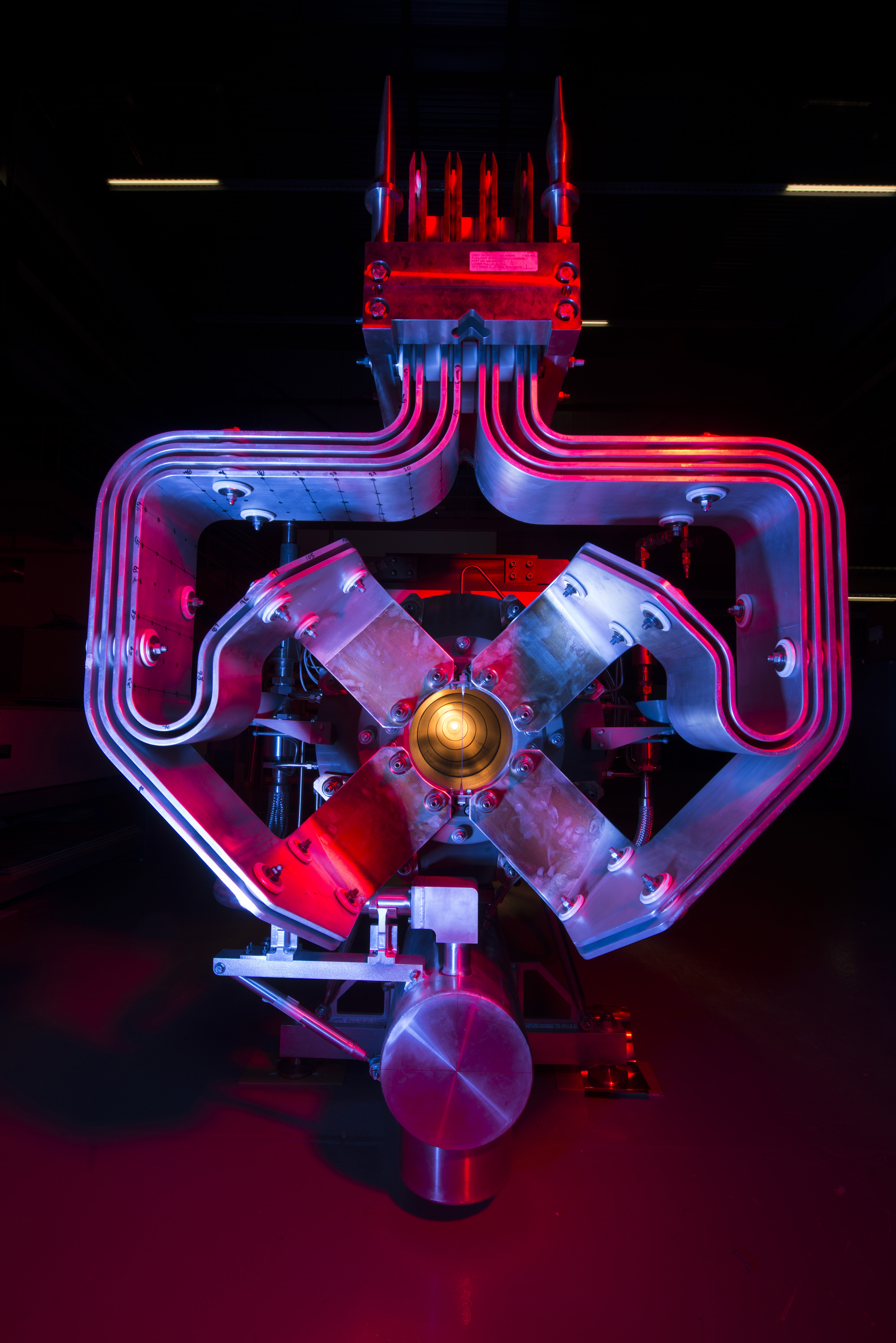
Example of magnetic horn used in NuMI neutrino beam

The beamline for DUNE is called the "Long Baseline Neutrino Facility" (LBNF). The final design calls for a 2.4 MW proton beam from the Main Injector accelerator to be targeted in the LBNF beamline to produce pions and kaons that are magnetically focused into a decay pipe via a magnetic horn where they decay to neutrinos. The neutrinos will travel in a straight line through the Earth, reaching about 30 kilometers (19 mi) underground near the mid-point, to arrive at the underground laboratory in Lead, South Dakota.

To point the neutrinos toward the underground laboratory, the beam must be directed into the earth at a steep angle. LBNF construction will include a 58-foot-high (18 m) hill made of compacted soil, connecting to a 680-foot-long (210 m) tunnel that will contain a 635-foot-long (194 m) particle decay pipe. The hill is integral to the "improved tritium management [that is] a major focus on the design of this new, higher beam power facility." Tritium produced by beamlines can enter the surface ground water, however rates at Fermilab are maintained at a level well below that allowed by regulations.

=== Dependence of LBNF on the PIP II project ===
In order to provide 1.2 MW of protons to LBNF, the second phase of the Proton Improvement Project ("PIP II"), which will increase proton delivery from the Fermilab accelerator chain by 60%, must be completed. The cost of this Fermilab upgrade as of 2022 is $1.28B. Thus, the PIP II and DUNE Phase I combined costs exceed $4B. The PIP II project received approval to begin construction in April 2022 and is expected to be completed by 2028.

=== DUNE far detector ===
The DUNE far detector design is based on state-of-the-art Liquid Argon Time Projection Chamber (LArTPC) technology. The far detector will consist of a total volume of 70-kilotons of liquid argon located deep underground, 1.5 kilometers (4,850 ft) under the surface. The current design divides the liquid argon between four LArTPC modules with a "fiducial volume" (the volume usable for physics analysis, which is smaller than the total volume to avoid interactions near detector edges) of 10 kilotons each. About 800,000 tons of rock will be excavated to create the caverns for the far detectors.

Since LArTPCs are relatively new technology, extensive R&D and prototyping have been required. Prototype detectors are being constructed and tested at CERN. The first of the two prototypes, the single-phase ProtoDUNE (CERN experiment NP04), recorded its first particle tracks in September 2018. CERN's participation in DUNE marked a new direction in CERN's neutrino's research and the experiments are referred to as part of the Neutrino Platform in the laboratory's research programme.

The MicroBooNE experiment and ICARUS experiment detectors are a pair of 100-ton-scale LArTPCs in the Fermilab program that also act as R&D platforms for DUNE detector development. These experiments have provided important input, but are more than 20 times smaller than the DUNE modules. MicroBooNE is the longest continuously running LArTPC detector, having taken data from 2015 to 2021—considerably shorter than the time-period of 20 years expected for DUNE.

=== DUNE near detector ===
The DUNE near detector will be located on the Fermilab site, downstream of LBNF, about 600 meters (2,000 ft) from where the neutrinos are produced. The DUNE near detector comprises several subdetectors that will sit side by side. One of these (SAND) will be installed along the neutrino beam axis. The others (NDLAr and NDGar) are movable and can be shifted in the direction perpendicular to the beam to detect neutrinos at different production angles. The primary purpose is to monitor and characterize the beam as the neutrinos are created in the LBNF line, so as to make accurate predictions for interaction rates at the DUNE far detector.

== History leading to the international collaboration ==
The project was originally started as a US-only project called the Long Baseline Neutrino Experiment (LBNE); in around 2012–2014 a descope was considered with a near-surface detector to reduce cost. However, the Particle Physics Project Prioritization Panel (P5) concluded in its 2014 report that the research activity being pursued by LBNE "should be reformulated under the auspices of a new international collaboration, as an internationally coordinated and internationally funded program, with Fermilab as host". The LBNE collaboration was officially dissolved on January 30, 2015, shortly after the new collaboration recommended by P5 was formed on January 22, 2015. The new collaboration selected the name Deep Underground Neutrino Experiment (DUNE).

In response to the P5 call for more international involvement, as of 2022, scientists from over 30 countries were involved in the construction of LBNF and DUNE. In 2017, the UK's Science and Technology Facilities Council (STFC) announced a £65M investment in DUNE and LBNF. By 2022, the international partners providing in-kind contributions also included CERN, Brazil, Switzerland and Poland and the total foreign contribution to the $3B project was $570M, or about 20%.

== Discoveries ==
In August 2024, it was announced that scientists detected the first neutrinos using a DUNE prototype particle detector at the U.S. Department of Energy's Fermi National Accelerator Laboratory.

== Revisions to scope, cost, and schedule ==
The original scope and cost for the LBNE project was established in step-1 of the Department of Energy "Critical Decision" process. Approval of CD-1 occurred in December 2012 The approved design significantly scaled back the physicist's request, which cost $1.7B. The CD-1 approval was for a budget of $850M, the proposed near detector was not included and the far detectors were recommended to be located on the surface rather than underground.

Following the P5 recommendation for a more robust project scope that included underground detectors, the project received a first CD-1 reaffirmation ("CD-1R") under the name LBNF/DUNE in November 2015. The scope of LBNF/DUNE was published in the 2016 Conceptual Design Report called for the first two far detector modules to be completed in 2024, the beam to be operational in 2026, and the four modules to be operational in 2027. The DOE estimated the project's cost to be between $1.26 billion to $1.86 billion. At the time of CD-1R, the DOE required that if the projected baseline cost rise to exceed $2.79 billion, or 50% above the range's upper bound, then CD-1R must be revisited---a situation that was already being realized by 2020.

In November 2021, Department of Energy (DOE) Office of Science officials reported to the High Energy Physics Advisory Panel that although DUNE had secured $570M in international funding at that time, the total cost of the project was at the point of triggering a CD-1R rereview, called CD-1RR. DOE reviews held in January and June 2021 concluded that even a descoped version of the project consisting of only two far detectors and a near detector would exceed the DOE upper allowed range of total project cost growth of $2.75B. The CD-1RR process was to establish an improved cost range and schedule by mid-2022. Due to a history of lower-than-requested congressional appropriations for the project, at the same November 2021 meeting, DOE presented a "conservative profile [for funding] that the Office of Science can support."

In March 2022, as part of the CD-1RR process, DOE announced that the project would be completed in two phases. The plan for phasing was announced during the Snowmass Process, an exercise periodically organized by the Division of Particles and Fields (DPF) of the American Physical Society to plan the future of particle physics. Nominally, Phase I would consist of the first two far detector modules, a subset of the near detector system, and the 1.2 MW beamline, to be completed by 2032 for the estimated $3.1B cost.

The CD-1RR process was completed on February 16, 2023, with an estimated cost for the project of $3.3B and an upper allowed cost range of $3.7B. To meet this cost, detector module 2 will be only 40% filled with liquid argon at project completion, and therefore not immediately usable for physics. The $3.3B cost does not include the approximately $1B price of the PIP II upgrade that is required for DUNE, nor $660M promised as of February 2023, from international partners for DUNE. Including these funds, the total cost for Phase I of LBNF/DUNE at the end of the CD-1RR review process was close to $5B.

Phase II would complete the full scope by adding the additional two far modules, completing the suite of subdetectors at the near site and upgrading the beam power to 2.4 MW. Phase II represents cost beyond the $3.1B estimate for Phase I and has been estimated to be at least an additional $900M. Physicists have expressed concern that the two-phase plan may lead to DUNE falling far behind its primary competition, the Hyper-Kamiokande experiment, and that Phase II may not ever be constructed.

== Rising costs ==
Project manager Chris Mossey reported on the source of the rising costs to the 2023 Particle Physics Project Prioritization Panel at a meeting held at Fermilab in March 2023. He stated that the sources were:

- "The cost and complexities of the far site conventional facilities construction was underestimated (+ approximately $300M)"
- "The cost of detector installation was assumed to be off project (+ approximately $200M)"
- "Stretched out funding raised costs due to escalation and longer execution period (+ approximately $300M)"
- "Full understanding of needed project scope (+ approximately $200M)"
- "Gaps in planned assumptions regarding partner participation caused scope to be later assumed by DOE project (+ approximately $100M)"
- "DOE reviews recommended significantly raising the contingency level (+ approximately $400M)"

Apart from the project management issues identified above, one can also identify sociological issues that contributed to the rising costs:

- The 2014 P5 recommendation was silent on cost-caps or priorities for phasing, listing only performance metrics, thereby missing an opportunity to prevent budget escalation.
- Willingness of the Department of Energy Office of Science to upwardly-revise costs through the CD "refresh" (CD-1R and CD-1RR) processes. This leniency on requirements to maintain cost-caps can be contrasted with the Japanese governments cost-control of the competing Hyper-K experiment.

== Competition from Hyper-K and other experiments ==
The primary competition to DUNE is the Hyper-Kamiokande (Hyper-K) experiment. Hyper-K is a 260 kton total volume detector under construction 295 km (183 mi) from the Japan Proton Accelerator Research Complex (J-PARC) neutrino source. Construction is estimated to be completed by 2027. The Japanese government has had strict cost controls and has not allowed the costs to Japan to extend beyond the original 2016 estimate of approximately $600M. The project has received about $150M in international contributions. Thus, the cost of Hyper-K is approximately equal to the CD-1 approved cost for LBNE (the DUNE predecessor) in the early 2010's.

In comparison, the DUNE Phase I detector is much smaller—only 17 kt—and the distance from the Fermilab neutrino source to the detector is longer—1,300 km (810 mi). This leads to a much lower expected rate of interactions in DUNE than Hyper-K. Also, the timescale of Hyper-K remains on-track, and so the detector can be expected to start taking data 4 to 5 years earlier than the present projections for DUNE.

The final report of the Snowmass 2021 Topical Group Report on Three-Flavor Neutrino Oscillations released on June 15, 2022 estimated that a 5σ (hence discovery level) result on CP violation could potentially be released from Hyper-K in 2034 and from DUNE in 2039. DUNE can reach a 5σ understanding of the mass ordering ahead of Hyper-K, as Hyper-K has a shorter baseline than DUNE, and capability of determining the mass ordering depends on distance the neutrinos travel.. Additionally, the experiments have complementarity in many parts of their programs, including sensitivity to different flavors of astrophysical neutrinos, such as from a potential galactic supernova, due to the different target nuclei.

Fermilab Director Merminga was asked about the potential for DUNE to be scooped by competition in a presentation to the House Science Committee in June 2022. In response, Merminga claimed that the projects are complementary, with DUNE providing more precise reconstructions of neutrino interactions due to the liquid argon technology than can be achieved in the water-based Hyper-K water detector. However, Merminga did not explain why more precise reconstruction is required.

== Construction at the Sanford Underground Research Facility ==
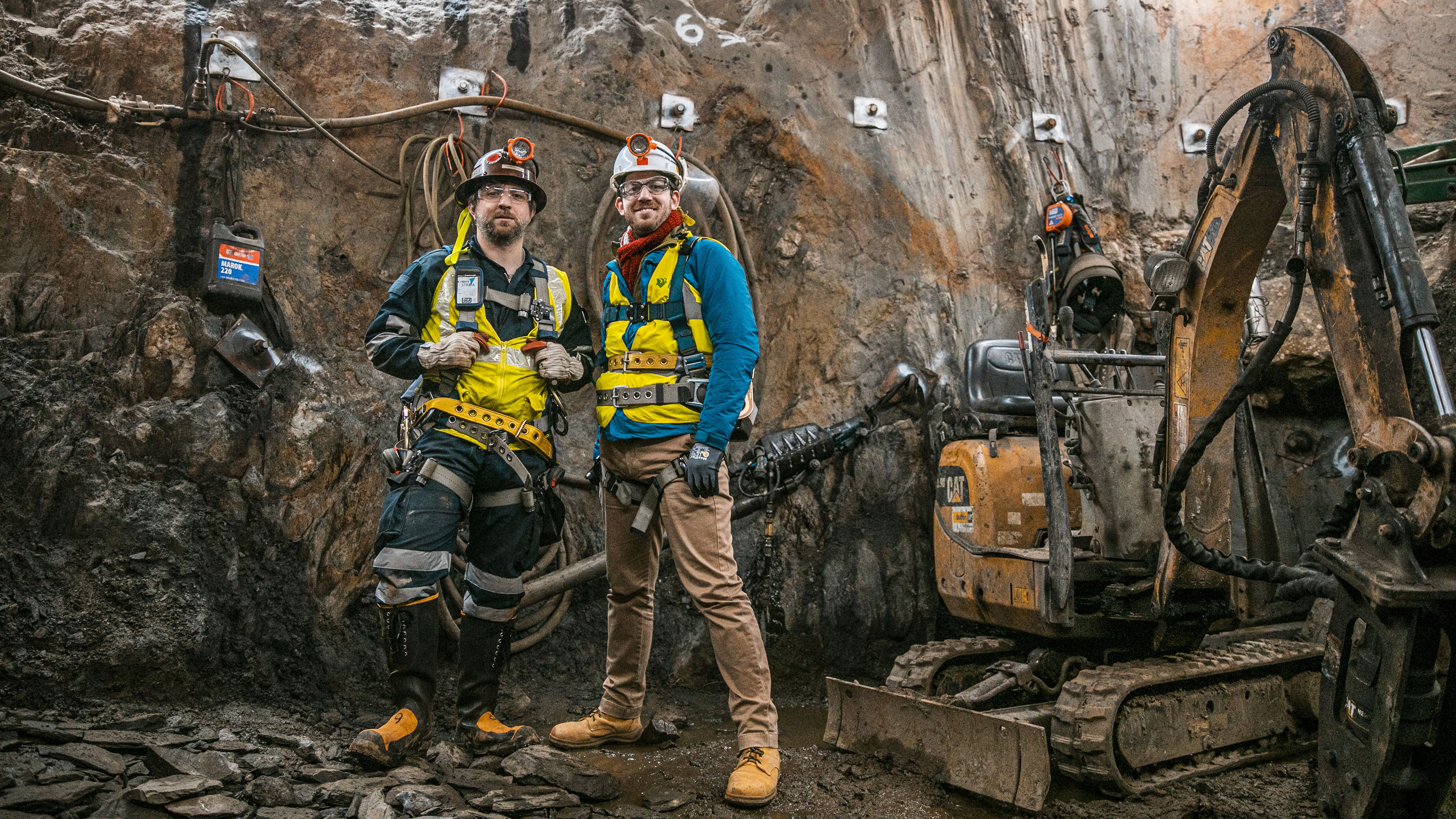
Crews working on the Deep Underground Neutrino Experiment

The Sanford Underground Research Facility makes use of, and is extending, the facilities of the Homestake Mine (South Dakota), which ceased operations at the end of 2001, to accommodate the far detector modules. Excavation of the DUNE far detector cavities began on July 21, 2017. Seven years later, on August 15, 2024, the completion of the caverns was announced.

Delays in completion arose from both the complexity of the project underground and from issues with dust release at the surface. Rock removed from underground were deposited in the Open Cut in the center of the city of Lead, South Dakota. In June 2021, plumes of dust rising from the Open Cut due to DUNE construction led to complaints from businesses, homeowners, and users of a nearby park. Complaints continued through spring 2022 without adequate response from Fermilab management, resulting in the South Dakota Science and Technology Authority shutting down excavation on March 31, 2022.

An investigation ensued in which the Fermilab management team admitted to failures in protocols, and instigated new measures to prevent black dust from leaving the Open Cut. With these assurances in place, Fermilab was allowed to resume rock dumping on April 8, 2022. Excavation of the DUNE underground detector caverns was completed on August 15, 2024.

DUNE remained under construction, with commissioning of the first detector modules planned for 2028. In April 2026, the underground construction project received the Underground Construction Association's Project of the Year Award in recognition of the successful completion of the excavation phase. Detector installation started in November 2026.
