= ProtoDUNE =

Prototype neutrino experiment

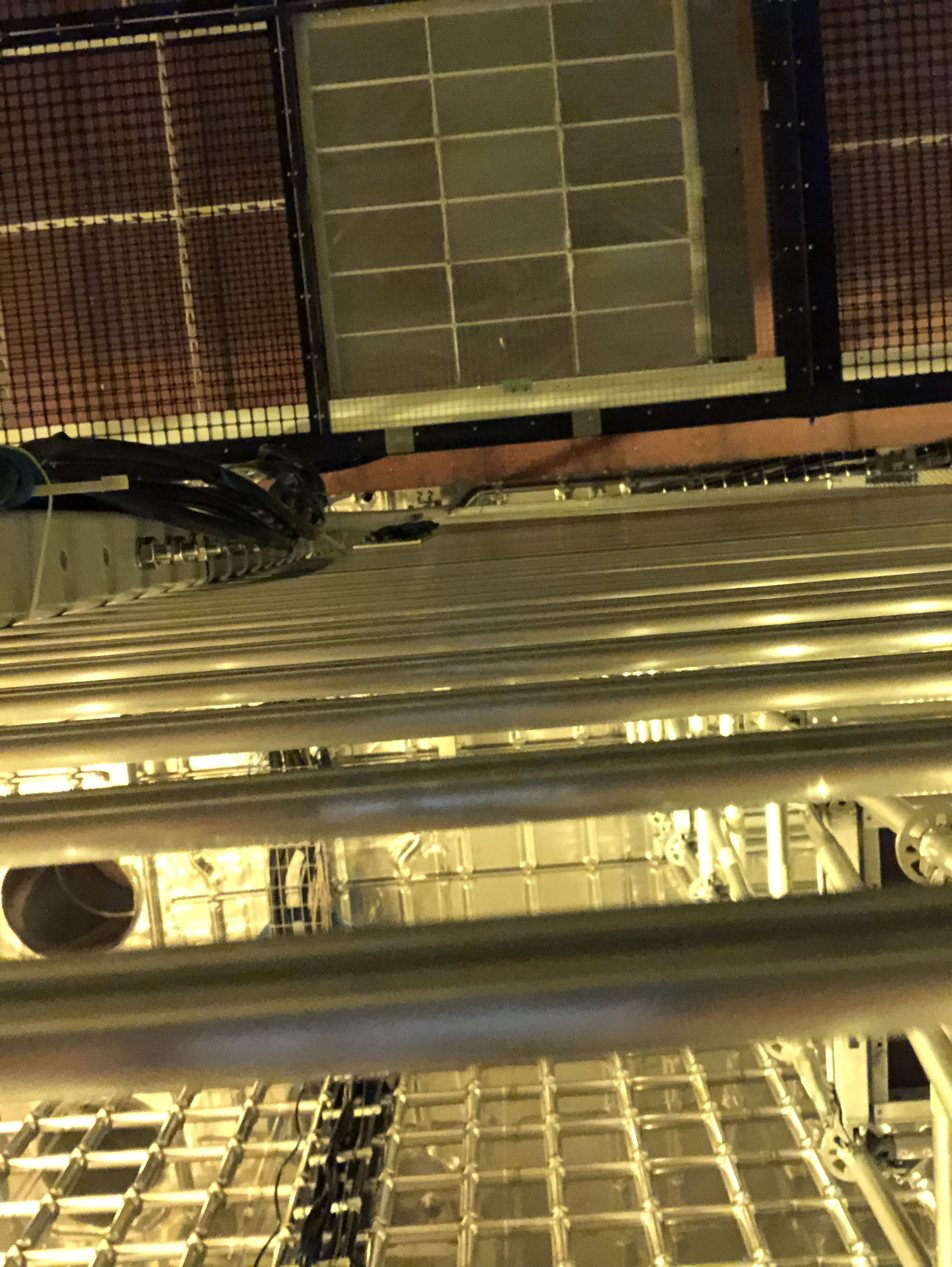
The photon detection system in the cathode and anodes inside the ProtoDUNE-VD.

The ProtoDUNE experiment is a prototype for DUNE in development by CERN, which will measure neutrino interactions with target atoms. DUNE will use a liquid-argon time projection chamber as a target for these neutrinos, also known as a LArTPC. Neutrino collisions knock electrons off of atoms in the LArTPC and release light energy, both of which can be measured by ProtoDUNE. Scientists use a negatively-charged anode plane array (APA) to attract and record the path of the electrons, thereby recording information about the collision itself. The ProtoDUNE detector is around the size of a three-storey house, and the DUNE project will use modules twenty times the size of ProtoDUNE. ProtoDUNE was successfully tested in 2018; as of 2023 it is the largest LArTPC ever constructed. Two detectors have been built at the neutrino platform, each containing around 800 metric tons of liquid argon. A cryostat is used to insulate the detector, which needs to be kept at temperatures of -184°C (-300°F) for the argon to remain liquid.

== Construction ==
It took two years to build the first ProtoDUNE detector, and another eight weeks to fill it with 800 tons of liquid argon. Originally, one detector was built to be single-phase (ProtoDUNE-SP), using only liquid argon, while the other was built to be dual-phase (ProtoDUNE-DP), using both liquid and gaseous argon. The goal of the prototypes is to solve any engineering problems that DUNE might face before construction begins. A group led by Bob Paulos in the University of Wisconsin–Madison Physical Sciences Lab designed the APA for the single-phase detector, and the APAs were built by the UW–Madison group and the Science and Technology Facilities Council's Daresbury Laboratory. In addition, CERN designed a cathode plane that would repel electrons. The dual-phase detector operated similarly, but with a slightly different array configuration. Although DUNE's neutrinos will be provided by the Long-Baseline Neutrino Facility, CERN expanded their existing network to use a particle beam to test the detectors. The beam window system that allowed researchers to test ProtoDUNE was designed, fabricated, and installed by the Department of Energy's Lawrence Berkeley National Laboratory.

== Testing ==
In 2018, ProtoDUNE recorded its first particle tracks. In 2020, researchers published a paper regarding the testing of the ProtoDUNE-SP detector. They used an 800-GeV beam of protons and electrons from CERN's SPS accelerator to test the capabilities of the ProtoDUNE-SP detector. In the test, the results from ProtoDUNE-SP were cross-checked with those from particle detectors located just before the detector. ProtoDUNE uses reconstruction software to differentiate an actual interaction from noise. This test revealed that the detector had a signal-to-noise ratio of fifty to one and that over 99% of the detector channels were working properly. As of 2023, CERN is building ProtoDUNE II, which will include a vertical drift detector (ProtoDUNE-VD). ProtoDUNE II will contain four APAs and light sensors.
