= ArgoNeuT =

Liquid argon neutrino detector

The Argon Neutrino Teststand (ArgoNeuT) detector, is a liquid argon neutrino detector at the Fermi National Accelerator Laboratory (Fermilab). The results of the experiment may aid in understanding the nature of neutrinos. This experiment is the precursor to the MicroBooNE experiment. Researchers finished collecting data from ArgoNeuT in March 2010, however analysis is still underway.

== See also ==
- Fermilab
- MicroBooNE
