= Snowmass Process =

Scientific collaboration

The Snowmass Process is a particle physics community planning exercise sponsored by the Division of Particles and Fields of the American Physical Society. During this process, scientists develop a collective vision for the next seven to ten years for particle physics research in the US.

== History ==
Original planning meetings were held beginning in 1982 in Snowmass, Colorado, but that has not been the location since 2005. More recent locations of the Snowmass Process include the University of Minnesota (2013) and the University of Washington (2021), which was delayed until July 2022, due to COVID.

== Description ==
The modern Snowmass Process consists of a series of small meetings, which culminate in a community-wide meeting. The Snowmass Process solicits reports on progress and plans within "frontiers". Snowmass 2021 identified ten frontiers: "energy; neutrino physics; rare processes and precision measurements; cosmic; theory; accelerator; instrumentation; computation; underground facilities; and community engagement".

Members of the particle physics community submit Letters of interest and provide input to contributed whitepapers. The frontiers use these whitepapers to provide web-based reports based on the material that they receive. The final output of the Snowmass Process is a Snowmass Summary for the Public, a Snowmass Summary Report, and the Snowmass Book.

== Outcomes of Snowmass 2013 ==
The Snowmass Process outcomes of 2013 were used to inform the decisions of the 2014 Particle Physics Project Prioritization Panel. A newsworthy outcome of the 2021 Snowmass Process was the announcement that the Deep Underground Neutrino Experiment would be pursued in two distinct phases.

== Outcomes of Snowmass 2021 ==
The outcomes of the Snowmass 2021 process, which extended into 2022, were determined at a final meeting held in July 2022 in Seattle, Washington that had 743 in-person attendees and 654 virtual participants. Snowmass outcomes were covered in detailed articles by the scientific press. The title of the Scientific American article, "Physicists Struggle to Unite Around Future Plans", summed up the problem of convergence of opinion. The articles report that two major problems stymied the field: lack of observation of new particles and rocketing costs of ongoing projects.

No unexpected particles were observed in the first 15 years of data-taking at the Large Hadron Collider (LHC), the highest energy accelerator on Earth—a disappointment stated by many physicists throughout the Snowmass process, and reflecting a view that has also been expressed outside of the Snowmass meetings. Although LHC will continue to run with modest upgrades, this lack of discovery leaves no clear focus for the next decade of high energy searches, and may also point to a "nightmare-scenario" where the Standard Model that forms the present basis of particle physics is complete up to the Planck scale (an energy level far beyond the ability of any conceivable experiment to probe) and particle physics "wheeze[s] to its end".

However the 2012 the discovery of an expected particle, the Higgs Boson, has given the field hope of finding new physics through precision searches for unexpected Higgs interactions. As a result, during the Snowmass process, physicists argued for precision measurements at a Higgs factory constructed of an electron-positron collider. Many Higgs factories are proposed for outside of the US, including at the European center for particle physics, CERN, as well as in China, and so "a surprise at Snowmass 'was the grassroots support for a collider on US soil'" that grew out of a new US-developed technology called the "cool copper collider". An alternative if the world-wide competition for an electron-positron machine is too stiff would be to invest in a Muon collider that could act as a Higgs factory with an approach that is unique worldwide. Muon colliders were discussed at the 2013 Snowmass, but shelved due to insufficiently advanced technology. However, at the 2022 final Snowmass meeting there was an "enthusiastic revival" of the concept.

The possibility of establishing any major new project in the US in the 2023-2033 decade, including a Higgs Factory, is limited due to the rising costs and multi-year delays of existing projects. In particular, at Snowmass, physicists expressed deep concern about the Deep Underground Neutrino Experiment (DUNE) project, which has risen from a base cost of $1.3B in 2015 to $3.1B for a de-scoped instrument. Cost over-runs and delays of DUNE are problematic due to stiff competition from a similar experiment in Japan, leaving physicists to question the value of DUNE results when they are obtained. Worries were expressed by physicists that issues with DUNE were "smoothed over, not smoothed out". Some physicists at Snowmass suggested that the DUNE project might be cancelled, comparing the ominous cost-growth to the Superconducting Super Collider (SSC) that was cancelled when the cost tripled.

The whitepapers from the Snowmass process provide input to the 2023 P5 study. The 2023 P5 committee was announced in December 2022.

== See also ==
- Decadal survey
- Scientific collaboration network
