= Particle Physics Project Prioritization Panel =

Scientific advisory panel for particle physics in the US

Logo of the Particle Physics Project Prioritization Panel, intended to evoke the five science drivers of particle physics

The Particle Physics Project Prioritization Panel (P5) is a scientific advisory panel tasked with recommending plans for U.S. investment in particle physics research over the next ten years, on the basis of various funding scenarios. The P5 is a temporary subcommittee of the High Energy Physics Advisory Panel (HEPAP), which serves the Department of Energy's Office of Science and the National Science Foundation. In 2014, the panel was chaired by Steven Ritz of the University of California, Santa Cruz. In 2023, the panel was chaired by Hitoshi Murayama of the University of California, Berkeley.

== 2014 report ==
In 2013, HEPAP was asked to convene a panel (the P5) to evaluate research priorities in the context of anticipated developments in the field globally in the next 20 years. Recommendations were to be made on the basis of three funding scenarios for high-energy physics:

- A constant funding level for the next three years followed by an annual 2% increase, relative to the FY2013 budget
- A constant funding level for the next three years followed by an annual 3% increase, relative to the proposed FY2014 budget
- An unconstrained budget

=== Science drivers ===
In May 2014, the first P5 report since 2008 was released. The 2014 report identified five "science drivers"—goals intended to inform funding priorities—drawn from a year-long discussion within the particle physics community. These science drivers are:

- Use of the Higgs boson as a tool for further inquiry
- Investigation of the physics of neutrino mass
- Investigation of the physics of dark matter
- Investigation of the physics of dark energy and cosmic inflation
- Exploration of new particles, interactions, and physics principles

=== Recommendations ===
In pursuit of the five science drivers, the 2014 report identified three "high priority large category" projects meriting significant investment in the FY2014–2023 period, regardless of the broader funding situation: the High Luminosity Large Hadron Collider (a proposed upgrade to the Large Hadron Collider located at CERN in Europe); the International Linear Collider (a proposed electron-positron collider, likely hosted in Japan); and the Long Baseline Neutrino Facility (an expansion of the proposed Long Baseline Neutrino Experiment (that was renamed the Deep Underground Neutrino Experiment), to be constructed at Fermilab in Illinois and at the Homestake Mine in South Dakota).

In addition to these large projects, the report identified numerous smaller projects with potential for near-term return on investment, including the Mu2e experiment, second- and third-generation dark matter experiments, particle-physics components of the Large Synoptic Survey Telescope (LSST), cosmic microwave background experiments, and a number of small neutrino experiments.

The report made several recommendations for significant shifts in priority, namely:

- An increase in the proportion of the high-energy physics budget devoted to construction of new facilities, from 15% to 20%-25%
- An expansion in scope of the Long Baseline Neutrino Experiment to a major international collaboration, with redirection of resources from other R&D projects to the development of higher powered proton beams for the neutrino facility
- Increased funding for second-generation dark matter detection experiments
- Increased funding of cosmic microwave background (CMB) research

The panel stressed that the most conservative of the funding scenarios considered would endanger the ability of the U.S. to host a major particle physics project while maintaining the necessary supporting elements.

=== Impact and outcomes since 2014 ===
A goal of the 2014 P5 exercise was to provide Congress with a science-justified roadmap for project funding. Five years later, in 2019, the Department of Energy Office of Science declared: "Congressional appropriations reflect strong support for P5. Language in appropriations reports have consistently recognized community’s efforts in creating and executing the P5 report strategy" and "P5 was wildly successful." From 2016 to 2020, the High Energy Physics (HEP) budget grew from less than $800 million to more than $1 billion.

However, members of the high energy physics community were concerned because the increased funding went primarily toward projects, while funding for core research and technology programs, which was also supported by P5, declined from $361 million to $316 million. In 2020, an assessment of progress of the P5-defined program produced by the High Energy Physics Advisory Panel (HEPAP) concluded: "While investments over the past 5 years have focused on project construction, it will be fundamentally important to balance the components of the [High Energy Physics] budget to continue successful execution of the P5 plan. Operations of the newly constructed experiments require full support to reap their scientific goals. The [High Energy Physics] research program also needs strong support to fully execute the plan, throughout the construction, operations, and data analysis phases of the experiments, and to lay a foundation for the future."

As of 2022, several of the "Large Projects" identified as priorities by the 2014 P5 had fallen considerably behind schedule or been affected by cost gaps, including:

- The Deep Underground Neutrino Experiment, has been reduced in scope, with start-up delayed from 2027 to 2032.
- The mu2e experiment was delayed from 2020 to 2026.
- The PIP-II project start-up was pushed back from 2020 to 2028.
- The High Luminosity LHC contributions from Fermilab faced a $90M cost gap in 2021.
- The International Linear Collider (ILC), proposed for construction in Japan, was "shelved".

== Prelude to the 2023 report ==
=== Issues ===
The P5 process occurred in spring 2023 and was informed by the outcomes of the 2021 Snowmass Process finalized in summer 2022. The Snowmass 2021 study identified two existential threats to the field that P5 must address:

- That the field had entered a "nightmare scenario" because no unexpected physics signatures had been observed by experiments at the highest energy accelerator, the Large Hadron Collider. As pointed out by many at the final Snowmass meeting, this gave little basis for the 2023 P5 to recommend new large projects.
- That LBNF/DUNE (also called the Deep Underground Neutrino Experiment), the flagship project that came out of the 2014 P5, would be reevaluated due to spiraling costs and extended delays. The escalation led to comparisons to the Superconducting Super Collider (SSC), a particle physics Megaproject that was cancelled mid-way through construction in 1993 due to cost over-run---a debacle with enormous personal and scientific costs to the particle physicists involved.

Along with these major issues, P5 also faced a field that was less unified than in 2014, as was emphasized by the title of the Scientific American report on Snowmass 2021 outcomes: "Physicists Struggle to Unite around Future Plans." Some members of the field expressed that the pressure to project a unified opinion was stifling debate, with one physicist telling a reporter from Physics Today: "There are big issues people didn’t discuss." Panel chair Hitoshi Murayama expressed awareness of this problem, saying that "community buy-in is key" for the success of the P5 report.

=== Panel ===
The membership of the 2023 P5 was announced in December 2022, with Hitoshi Murayama of the University of California, Berkeley as head.

Similar to 2014, the 2023 P5 members were all particle and accelerator physicists; no members specialized in project management. This placed the committee in a good position to evaluate responses to the "nightmare scenario." However, this made it difficult for the members to assess whether the information on cost and schedule provided to the committee had a sound basis. That lack of expertise may explain how the 2014 P5 failed to foresee the LBNF/DUNE cost-and-schedule crisis, and would make it difficult for the 2023 P5 to head off an "SSC scenario."

=== Tasking ===
Regina Rameika from the Department of Energy Office of Science summarized the P5 charge in a presentation to the High Energy Physics Advisory Panel on December 8, 2022. The charge asked P5 to:

- Update the 2014 P5 strategic plan, making recommendations for actions within a ten-year time-frame while considering a twenty-year context.
- Re-evaluate the 2014 "science drivers" and recommended scientific projects, as well as make the scientific case for new initiatives.
- Maintain a balance between large projects and small experiments. P5 does not recommend specific small experiments but was asked to comment on the scientific focus for that portfolio. The emphasis on P5 direction to small experiments was new compared to the 2014 P5 charge.
- Address synergies within US programs and with the worldwide program.

The priority of projects was being considered within two funding scenarios from the Department of Energy (DOE) and the National Science Foundation (NSF). The first, which was described by physicists as "grim", envisioned a 2% increase per year of the high energy physics budgets for the DOE and the NSF. The second assumed full funding from the 2022 CHIPS and Science Act and a 3% increase per year to the budget for high energy physics. P5 was asked to consider operating costs, including the rising cost of energy to run accelerators.

=== Input from community meetings and town halls ===
Throughout 2023, P5 received input from the community through meetings that included invited talks and requested talks in a "town hall" format. Four meetings were held at national laboratories. Two virtual town halls were also held. The topics of the meetings covered physics goals across the range of topics defined by the Snowmass Study, as well as the balance of university- and laboratory-based research, opportunities for early career scientists, and the need for public outreach.

=== Input from the International Benchmarking Report ===
In Autumn 2023, the P5 Panel received input from the HEPAP International Benchmarking Subpanel, headed by Fermilab scientists. This report is one in a series of evaluations of DOE supported science in an international context. Differences between high energy physics and the rest of the physics community are apparent in the report. For example, the report that citations are a poor metric for measurement of scientific impact. Two points made in the report are especially relevant to P5 considerations: 1) The US should prioritize being a "partner of choice" and 2) The US requires a range of project sizes and goals to maintain a healthy "scientific ecosystem".

The primary outcome of the benchmarking report was that "the U.S. is not always viewed as a reliable partner, largely due to unpredictable budgets and inadequate communication, and that shortcomings in domestic [High Energy Physics] programs are jeopardizing U.S. leadership." The report highlighted that the 1993 cancellation of the Superconducting Super Collider and the sudden 2008 termination of the B physics program at the Stanford Linear Accelerator Center, and the abrupt end of the TeVatron program at Fermilab followed by the immediate dismantling of the accelerator have caused the international community to lose confidence that the US will complete projects. Without addressing the DUNE project directly, this recommendation pointed to the potential negative impact on international cooperation if DUNE were abruptly curtailed by P5.

A second major recommendation of the benchmarking report focused on the need to maintain a program of projects at all scales, from small to large, and that are chosen to specifically enhance areas in which the US technology is lagging, such as in accelerator physics. This echoed calls from the community expressed in the P5 Town Halls.

== The 2023 report ==
In December 2023, the 2023 P5 report was released. The proposals contained therein were intended to help better understand some of the current concerns of particle physics, including challenges to the Standard Model, and involve studies primarily dealing with gravity, black holes, dark matter, dark energy, Higgs boson, muons, neutrinos, and more.

=== Science drivers and related experimental approaches ===
The 2023 P5 report identified three science drivers, each with two experimental approaches:

“Decipher the Quantum Realm” through “Elucidat[ing] the Mysteries of Neutrinos” and “Reveal[ing] the Secrets of the Higgs Boson.”

“Explore New Paradigms in Physics” though “Search[ing] for Direct Evidence of New Particles and Pursu[ing] Quantum Imprints of New Phenomena.”

“Illuminate the Hidden Universe” through “Determin[ing] the Nature of Dark Matter” and “Understand[ing] What Drives Cosmic Evolution.”

=== Specific recommendations ===
The recommendations that followed the statement of goals reflected the recommendations heard during the Snowmass process and those of the International Benchmarking Panel, discussed above.

In particular, Recommendation 1 stated “As the highest priority independent of the budget scenarios, [funding agencies must] complete construction projects and support operations of ongoing experiments and research to enable maximum science.” This reflects concerns throughout the community of potential abrupt cancellations of ongoing particle physics projects, as flagged by the Benchmarking Panel. The P5 report sought to control the narrative of the DUNE project, which has seen an explosion in cost between the 2014 and 2023 P5 reports and is now lagging behind the competing HyperKamiokande project that will turn on in 2027. P5 offered compromises on beam power for DUNE Phase I and reductions of the DUNE Phase II upgrades to keep the project funding on track to begin data-taking in 2031.

Despite the issues with DUNE, P5 recommended initiating work on a new megaproject called a muon collider. Accelerating and colliding muons for particle physics studies offers theoretical advantages over an electron-positron collider, but represents an untested and challenging new direction from a practical standpoint. The report stated: “Although we do not know if a muon collider is ultimately feasible, the road toward it leads from current Fermilab strengths and capabilities to a series of proton beam improvements and neutrino beam facilities, each producing world-class science while performing critical R&D towards a muon collider. At the end of the path is an unparalleled global facility on US soil. This is our Muon Shot.” The cost of a 10 TeV muon collider was not estimated in the report.

The report offered a new emphasis on cosmology and astrophysics as a branch of particle physics. P5 placed the $800M CMB-S4 experiment at the top of the list of new projects. The report also emphasized the importance of the planned expansion of the IceCube neutrino observatory in Antarctica, recommending funding for this new project in any budget scenario.

In a recommendation with an unusual level of specifics regarding its implementation, P5 introduced a new program entitled “Advancing Science and Technology through Agile Experiments" (ASTAE). This responds to calls by the community to support “small” experiments, which particle physics defines as costing less than $50M in total. Unlike other programs, this recommendation called for $35M/year to be invested in ASTAE. This recommendation again reflected the concerns identified by the International Benchmarking Panel.

=== Initial community support for the P5 Report ===
The American Physical Society, Fermi National Accelerator Laboratory and SLAC Laboratory organized endorsements by the community of the P5 report. As of January 15, the number of endorsers was 2602 US scientists. Among the endorsers, 37% were tenured faculty level or laboratory scientists, 9% were at the untenured faculty or laboratory scientist level, 16% were postdoctoral fellows, 20% were graduate students, and the remainder were other categories. The geographic distribution of the endorsements heavily favored Illinois, home of Fermilab, and California, home of SLAC.

=== Outcomes ===
Only six months after the release of the 2023 P5 report, the first and sixth priority new projects, CMB-S4 and IceCube-Gen2, faced major setbacks from a call by the NSF to immediately address the urgent need to update the South Pole Station infrastructure. In response, the NSF halted the installation of new projects until the end of the 2020s. Lack of near-term access to infrastructure at the pole led the NSF and the DOE to cancel the joint-agency CMB-S4 project, despite strong protest from the P5 leadership and appeals from the 500-person international team. The IceCube-Gen2 project, planned to begin installation in the latter part of the 2020s, may suffer delays due to the infrastructure renovations.
