= High Energy Physics Advisory Panel =

Scientific advisory body of the US government

The High Energy Physics Advisory Panel (HEPAP) is a permanent advisory committee to the United States Department of Energy and the National Science Foundation, created in 1967 and organized under the Federal Advisory Committee Act (FACA) of 1972.

The FACA says that advisory committees like HEPAP are “any committee, board, commission, council, conference, panel, task force, or other similar group”. An Advisory Committee must be established/utilized by one of these three:

- Statute or reorganization plan
- The President
- An agency whose interest is obtaining information for the President or the Federal Government

Under the FACA, the High Energy Physics Advisory Panel meets in public, and subpanels are appointed to meet and deliberate in private. In high-energy physics, peer review groups of scientists, knowledgeable in their fields, are asked to sit on these subpanels, and to make recommendations about future high energy physics projects. HEPAP either accepts or rejects panels’ recommendations, and the Department of Energy decides which projects to support in turn.

This panel focuses on changes to assist technological advancements in the field. It prioritizes long-term plans, strategies, and how much funding is appropriate to balance other areas of the program. HEPAP was created to have a diverse group of members with different points of view, areas of study, geographical locations, and experiences. Since HEPAP works under the FACA, they must follow all rules and regulations. These amendments emphasize public involvement, chartering, open meetings, and reporting.

== Members ==
Since 2000, HEPAP has had over 160 members. Committee members are considered as Special Government Employees. In 2024, HEPAP was composed of 19 members from all across the US. Seven new members were added, and their terms end in March 2027. The panel's participants have a 3-year term. The Under Secretary for Science and Energy holds the responsibility of nominating, appointing, renewing, and or terminating any of the committee’s membership. As of March 20, 2025, the updated member list has not been announced. Meetings have occurred in Washington, DC, Maryland, Virginia, and California over the past 20 years. Meetings occur about 2-4 times yearly and focus on various topics.

== Collaborations & Subcommittees ==
=== Collaborations ===
Collaborations allow HEPAP to have guidance on funding, long-term planning, and balancing the competing elements within the High Energy Physics parent program.

- Department of Energy (DOE): Provides advice for the national program in experimental and theoretical high-energy physics research
- National Science Foundation (NSF): HEPAP reports to NSF’s Mathematical & Physical Sciences Directorate
- National Aeronautics and Space Administration (NASA): HEPAP provides advice on particle-astrophysics research programs that overlap with NSF and NASA initiatives
- The Astronomy and Astrophysics Advisory Committee (AAAC): HEPAP and NASA both rely on information and insight from the AAAC
- National Academy of Sciences: Gives support when additional advice is needed
- International Collaborations: HEPAP aims for the U.S. to be the “partner of choice” in global projects. The panel sees an importance of international partnerships in particle physics

=== Subcommittees ===
The Particle Physics Project Prioritization Panel, a subcommittee of HEPAP, produces periodic reports, roughly once a decade, outlining funding priorities for particle physics investments by the United States. Its most recent report was released in December 2023.

== Charter ==
The FACA states that all committees must have a charter and must provide a report to multiple groups. HEPAP is chartered by the Department of Energy (DOE) while reporting to the Associate Director, Office of High Energy Physics, Office of Science (DOE), and the Assistant Director, Mathematical & Physical Sciences Directorate (NSF).

== Federal Advisory Committee Act ==
The Federal Advisory Committee Act legally defines how the FACA operates. The FACA claims that committees like HEPAP are essential. HEPAP was established because other committees did not already focus on the US Government's specific needs. The FACA also declares that their committees such as HEPAP will be disbanded when they can no longer work for their established purposes. They also state that all committees must keep Congress and the public informed on the purpose, members, activities, and costs. The function of committees should also be advisory only.

== Legislature Review ==
The House of Representatives and the committee of the Senate have the responsibility of deciding whether or not an advisory committee such as HEPAP needs to be abolished, merged, or revised to meet the primary purpose for which it was formed. This same group defines the purpose of the committee and requires the panel to have a diverse membership so multiple points of view can be provided. HEPAP also has provisions in place to ensure that there is no inappropriate influence from the appointed authority. This means that HEPAP should produce results based on their independent judgment. The legislature also oversees the submission and publishing of reports from the committee. Sufficient staff, meeting spaces, and funding are also given to HEPAP from the Legislature.
