= Liquid Scintillator Neutrino Detector =

Particle measurement device

The Liquid Scintillator Neutrino Detector (LSND) was a physics experiment at Los Alamos National Laboratory designed to detect neutrinos. The LSND project was created to look for evidence of neutrino oscillation and ran from 1993 to 1998. Its results indicate the existence of sterile neutrinos, which conflicts with other solar and atmospheric neutrino oscillation experiments and the Standard Model expectation of only three neutrino flavors.

== Experiment ==
Neutrinos for the LSND were produced at LANSCE (Los Alamos Neutron Science Center). A proton beam was collided with a water target, producing pions. These pions decayed to muons, which in turn decayed to mu neutrinos. The detector, located 30 meters (98 ft) away, consisted of a tank filled with 167 tons (50,000 gallons) of mineral oil and 14 pounds (6.4 kg) of b-PDB organic scintillator material. A neutrino event in the scintillator would produce Cherenkov radiation and scintillation light, which were detected by an array of 1220 photomultiplier tubes.

== Results ==
Most of the neutrinos detected at LSND were identified as mu neutrinos, but a small part (1 in 10^{4}) were electron neutrinos. As no electron neutrinos were produced at the source, this was interpreted as evidence of neutrino oscillations. However, the most up-to-date oscillation parameters do not predict measurable oscillations in the LSND baseline of 30 meters (98 ft).

A second possible interpretation proposes a heavy sterile neutrino, which is produced from the proton beam, then decays to lighter particles including electron neutrinos. However, this hypothesis is also at odds with modern measurements: cosmological data bound the mass of the sterile neutrino to m_{s} < 0.26eV (0.44eV) at 95% (99.9%) confidence limit, excluding at high significance the sterile neutrino hypothesis as an explanation of the LSND anomaly.

The controversial LSND result was tested by the MiniBooNE experiment at Fermilab, which found similar results. It is currently undergoing further tests at MicroBooNE at Fermilab.
