= MicroBooNE =

Liquid argon time projection chamber (LArTPC) at Fermilab in Batavia, Illinois

Coordinates: 41.837468°N 88.269528°W

MicroBooNE is a liquid argon time projection chamber (LArTPC) at Fermilab in Batavia, Illinois. It is located in the Booster Neutrino Beam (BNB) beamline where neutrinos are produced by colliding protons from Fermilab's booster-accelerator on a beryllium target; this produces many short-lived particles (mainly charged pions) that decay into neutrinos. The neutrinos pass through solid ground (to filter out particles that are not neutrinos from the beam), through another experiment called ANNIE, then solid ground, then through the Short-Baseline Near Detector (SBND), then ground again before it arrives at the MicroBooNE detector 470 meters downrange from the target. After MicroBooNE the neutrinos continue to the MiniBooNE detector and to the ICARUS detector. MicroBooNE is also exposed to the neutrino beam from the Main Injector (NuMI) which enter the detector at a different angle.

MicroBooNE's two main physics goals are to investigate the MiniBooNE low-energy excess and neutrino-argon cross sections. As part of the Short Baseline Neutrino program (SBN), it will be one of a series of neutrino detectors along with the new Short-Baseline Near Detector (SBND) and moved ICARUS detector.

MicroBooNE was filled with argon in July 2015 and began data taking. The collaboration announced that they had found evidence of the first neutrino interactions in the detector in November 2015. MicroBooNE collected five years of physics data, ending its run in 2021 as the longest continually operating liquid argon time projection chamber to date.

In October 2021, the results of the first three years of operation were reported. Analyses examined the MiniBooNE low-energy excess, one under a single photon hypothesis and under an electron hypothesis. No evidence for either of these explanations was found within MicroBooNE's sensitivity, which is set by the statistics and systematic uncertainty. The Fermilab press release accompanying the results claimed that the electron hypothesis test dealt "a blow to a theoretical particle known as the sterile neutrino." However, the accompanying commentary to the MicroBooNE papers, when they were published in Physical Review Letters, was entitled "Neutrino Mystery Endures." The full parameter space of sterile neutrino models hinted at by MiniBooNE and other data remains still under investigation.

Results published in December 2025 ruled out the single light sterile neutrino model with a 95% confidence level.
