= MiniBooNE =

Neutrino physics experiment

Coordinates: 41.8380722°N 88.269513°W

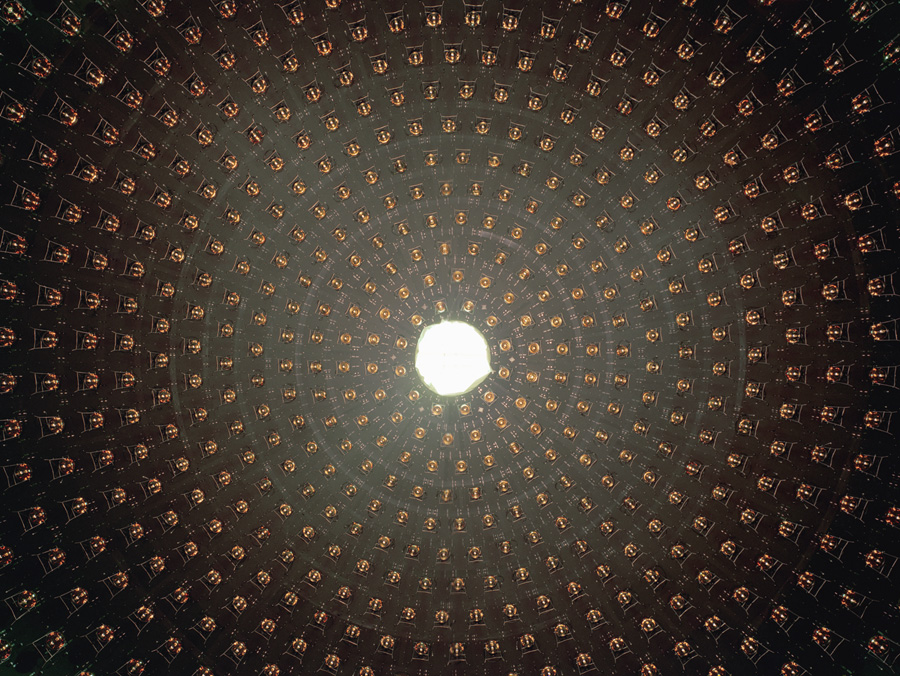
The interior of the MiniBooNE detector.

MiniBooNE is a Cherenkov detector experiment at Fermilab designed to observe neutrino oscillations (BooNE is an acronym for the Booster Neutrino Experiment). A neutrino beam consisting primarily of muon neutrinos is directed at a detector filled with 800 tons of mineral oil (ultrarefined methylene compounds) and lined with 1,280 photomultiplier tubes. An excess of electron neutrino events in the detector would support the neutrino oscillation interpretation of the LSND (Liquid Scintillator Neutrino Detector) result.

MiniBooNE started collecting data in 2002 and was still running in 2017. In May 2018, physicists of the MiniBooNE experiment reported a possible signal indicating the existence of sterile neutrinos.

== History and motivation ==
Experimental observation of solar neutrinos and atmospheric neutrinos provided evidence for neutrino oscillations, implying that neutrinos have masses. Data from the LSND experiment at Los Alamos National Laboratory are controversial since they are not compatible with the oscillation parameters measured by other neutrino experiments in the framework of the Standard Model. Either there must be an extension to the Standard Model, or one of the experimental results must have a different explanation. Moreover, the KARMEN experiment in Karlsruhe examined a [low energy] region similar to the LSND experiment, but saw no indications of neutrino oscillations. This experiment was less sensitive than LSND, and both could be right.

Cosmological data can provide an indirect but rather model-dependent bound to the mass of sterile neutrinos, such as the m_{s} < 0.26 eV (0.44 eV) at 95% (99.9%) confidence limit given by Dodelson et al. However, cosmological data can be accommodated within models with different assumptions, such as that by Gelmini et al.

MiniBooNE was designed to unambiguously verify or refute the LSND controversial result in a controlled environment.

=== 2007 ===
After the beam was turned on in 2002, the first results came in late March 2007, and showed no evidence for muon neutrino to electron neutrino oscillations in the LSND [low energy] region, refuting a simple 2-neutrino oscillation interpretation of the LSND results. More advanced analyses of their data are currently being undertaken by the MiniBooNE collaboration; early indications are pointing towards the existence of the sterile neutrino, an effect interpreted by some physicists to be hinting of the existence of the bulk or Lorentz violation.

=== 2008 ===
A collaboration of MiniBooNE with other scientists a new experiment, called MicroBooNE, was designed to further investigate sterile neutrinos.

=== 2018 ===
With a study published on arXiv, the collaboration announced that the finding of neutrino oscillations at MiniBooNE are confirmed at a 4.8 sigma level and, when combined with data at LSND, at a 6.1 sigma level. This hints at the detection of sterile neutrinos and a significant deviation from known physics. The implication of the paper is that some of the muon neutrinos are flipping to sterile neutrinos before switching identity again to electron neutrinos.
